= List of state leaders in the 19th century (1851–1900) =

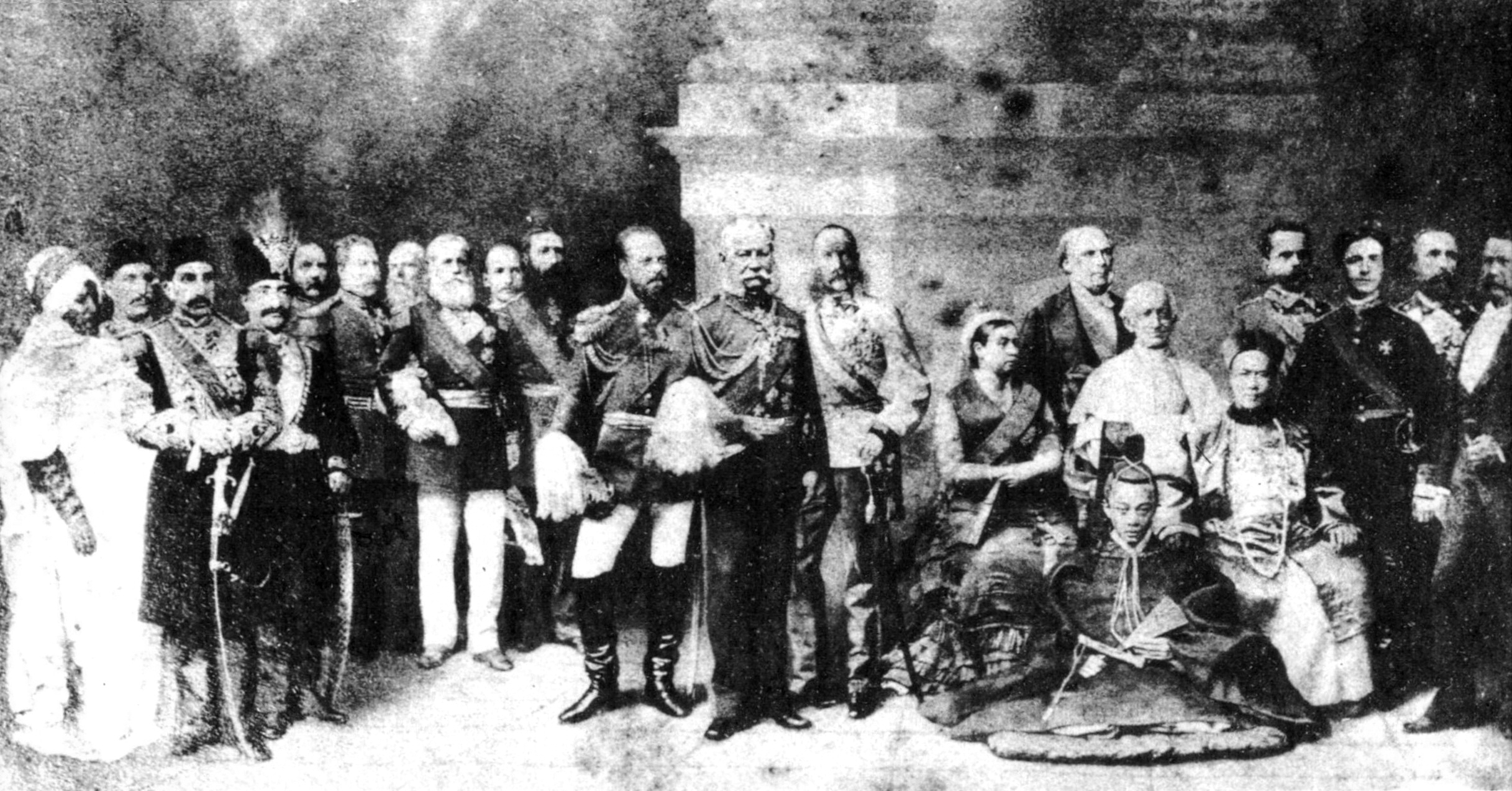
State leaders in 1889

This is a list of state leaders in the 19th century (1851–1900) AD, except for the leaders within British south Asia and its predecessor states, and those leaders within the Holy Roman Empire.

These polities are generally sovereign states, but excludes minor dependent territories, whose leaders can be found listed under territorial governors in the 19th century. For completeness, these lists can include colonies, protectorates, or other dependent territories that have since gained sovereignty.

== Africa ==
=== Africa: Central ===
Angola

- Kasanje Kingdom (complete list) –

- Kambolo ka Ngonga, King (1851–1856)
- Kamweje ka Kalunga, King (1856–1857)
- Mbumba a Kinguri, King (1857–1873)
- Malenge a Kitumba, King (1873)
- Kwango, King (1883–1885)
- Kasanje ka Kalanyi, King (1888)
- Kinguri kya Kiluanje, King (1896)

- Kingdom of Kongo (complete list) –

- Henrique III, King (1842–1857)
- Álvaro XIII, King (1857–1859)
- Pedro V, King (1859–1891)
vassal to Portugal: 1888–1914
- Álvaro XIV, King (1891–1896)
- Henrique IV, King (1896–1901)

- Portuguese Angola, (complete list) –

Colony, 1575–1951
For details see the Kingdom of Portugal under Southwest Europe

Cameroon

- Fondom of Bafut (complete list) –

- Achirimbi I, King (1799–1852)
- Abumbi I, King (1852–1916)

- Kingdom of Bamum (complete list) –

- Ngouhouo, Mfon (1818–1865)
- Ngoungoure, Mfon (1865)
- Nsangou, Mfon (1865–1884)

- Duala people (complete list) –

- Doo a Priso, Chief (19th century)
- Mbape a Bele, Chief (19th century)

- Kamerun (complete list) –

German colony, 1884–1916
For details see the German Empire under central Europe

Central African Republic

Chad

- Sultanate of Bagirmi (complete list) –

- 'Abdul Qadir II al-Mahdi, Mbangi (1846–1858)
- Abu-Sekkin Mohammed IV, Mbangi (1858–1870)
- 'Abd ar-Rahman II, Mbangi (1870–1871)
- Abu-Sekkin Mohammed IV, Mbangi (1871–1884)
- Burkomanda IV as-Saghir, Mbangi (1884–1885)
- Ngarmane Ermanala, Regent (1885)
- Gaourang II, Mbangi (1885–1918)

- Wadai Sultanate (complete list) –

- 'Izz ad-Din Muhammad al-Sharif ibn Salih Derret, Kolak (1835–1858)
- 'Ali ibn Muhammad, Kolak (1858–1874)
- Yusuf ibn 'Ali, Kolak (1874–1898)
- Ibrahim ibn 'Ali, Kolak (1898–1900)
- Ahmad Abu al-Ghazali ibn 'Ali, Kolak (1900–1901)

- rule of Rabih az-Zubayr

- Rabih az-Zubayr, warlord (1879–1900)

- French Chad, part of French Equatorial Africa (complete list) –

Colony, 1900–1960
For details see France under western Europe

Congo: Belgian; today, the Democratic Republic of the Congo

- Kuba Kingdom (complete list) –

- Bope Mobinji, Nyim (1840–1885)
- Mikope Mobinji, Nyim (1885–1890)
- KotoMboke, Nyim (1890–1896)
- Mishanga Pelenge, Nyim (1896–1900)

- Luba Empire (complete list) –

- Ilunga Kabale, muLopwe (1837–1864)
- Maloba Konkola, muLopwe (1864–1865)
- Kitamba, muLopwe (1865–1869)
- Kasongo a Kalombo, muLopwe (1869–1886)
- Nday a Mande, muLopwe (1886–1889)

- Lunda Empire (complete list) –

- Nawej II Ditend, Mwaant Yaav (c.1800–1852)
- Mulaj a Namwan, Mwaant Yaav (1852–1857)
- Cakasekene Naweej, Mwaant Yaav (1857)
- Muteba II a Cikombe, Mwaant Yaav (1857–1873)
- Mbala II a Kamong Isot, Mwaant Yaav (1873–1874)
- Mbumb I Muteba Kat, Mwaant Yaav (1874–1883)
- Cimbindu a Kasang, Mwaant Yaav (1883–1884)
- Kangapu Nawej, Mwaant Yaav (1884–1885)
- Mudib, Mwaant Yaav (1885–1886)
- Mutand Mukaz, Mwaant Yaav (1886–1887)
- Mbala III a Kalong, Mwaant Yaav (1887)

- Yeke Kingdom –

- Msiri, King (1856–1891)

- Congo Free State

- Sovereign –

- Leopold II of Belgium, Sovereign (1885–1908)

- Governors general (complete list) –

- Théophile Wahis, Governor general (1892–1908)

Congo: French; today, the Republic of the Congo

- Tio Kingdom –

- Illoy Ier, Makoko (?–c.1880)

- Kingdom of Loango (complete list) –

- N'Gangue M'voumbe Makosso Ma N'Sangou, King (1840-c.1883)

- French Congo part of French Equatorial Africa (complete list) –

Colony, 1882–1910
For details see France under western Europe

Equatorial Guinea

- Spanish Guinea (complete list) –

Colony, 1778–1968
For details see Spain in southwest Europe

Gabon

- Kingdom of Orungu (complete list) –

- Ombango Rogombe "Ikinda" / King Pascal, Agamwinboni (1840–1862)
- Ndebulia, Agamwinboni (1862–1865
- Ntchènguè, Agamwinboni (1865–1882
- Avonowanga, Agamwinboni (1882–?)

- French Gabon, part of French Equatorial Africa (complete list) –

French Colony, 1882–1910
For details see France under western Europe

São Tomé and Príncipe

- Portuguese São Tomé and Príncipe (complete list) –

Colony, 1470–1951
For details see the Kingdom of Portugal under Southwest Europe

=== Africa: East ===
Great Lakes area

Burundi

- Kingdom of Burundi (complete list) –

- Mwezi IV, King (c.1850–1908)

Kenya

- East Africa Protectorate (complete list) –

British protectorate, 1895–1920
For details see the United Kingdom under British Isles, Europe

- Pate Sultanate (complete list) –

Nabahani dynasty

- Ahmad ibn Fumo Bakari, Mfalume (1840–1856)
- Ahmad Simba Balla ibn Fumo Luti, Mfalume (1856–1858)

unnamed dynasty

- Shaykh Muhammad, Mfalume (1858–1870)

- Wituland (complete list) –

- Ahmad ibn Fumo Bakari, Mfalume (1858–1888)
- Fumo Bakari ibn Ahmad, Mfalume (1888–1890)
- Bwana Shaykh ibn Ahmad, Mfalume (1890–1891)
- Fumo 'Umar ibn Ahmad, Mfalume (1891–1893,1895–1923)

Rwanda

- Kingdom of Rwanda (complete list) –

- Mutara II Rwogera, King (1802–1853)
- Kigeli IV Rwabugiri, King (1853–1895)
- Mibambwe IV Rutarindwa, King (1895–1896)
- Yuhi V Musinga, King (1896–1931)

South Sudan

Tanzania

- German East Africa (complete list) –

Colony, 1885–1919
For details see the German Empire under central Europe

- Kingdom of Unyanyembe –

- Ifundikila, King (1840–1858)
- Mnywasela, King (c.1858–1860)
- Mkasiwa, King (1860–1875)
- Isike, King (1875–?)

- Kingdom of Urambo –

- Mirambo, Ntemi (1860–1884)

- Sultanate of Zanzibar (complete list) –

- Majid, Sultan (1856–1870)
- Barghash, Sultan (1870–1888)
- Khalifa I, Sultan (1888–1890)
- Ali I, Sultan (1890–1893)
- Hamad, Sultan (1893–1896)
- Khalid, Sultan (1896)
- Hamoud, Sultan (1896–1902)

Uganda

- Ankole (complete list) –

- Mutambuka, Omugabe (1839–1873)
- Ntare V Rugingiza, Omugabe (1873–1895)
- Kahaya II, Omugabe (1895–1944)

- Buganda (complete list) –

- Ssuuna II, Kabaka (1832–1856)
- Muteesa I, Kabaka (1856–1884)
- Mwanga II, Kabaka (1884–1888, 1889–1897)
- Kiweewa, Kabaka (1888)
- Kalema, Kabaka (1888–1889)
- Daudi Cwa II, Kabaka (1897–1939)

- Bunyoro (complete list) –

- Olimi V, Omukama (1848–1852)
- Kyebambe IV, Omukama (1852–1869)
- Kabalega, Omukama (1869–1898)
- Kitahimbwa, Omukama (1898–1902)

- Protectorate of Uganda (complete list) –

British protectorate, 1894–1962
For details see the United Kingdom under British Isles, Europe

Horn of Africa area

Djibouti

- French Somaliland (complete list) –

Colony, 1896–1946
For details see France under western Europe

Eritrea

- Italian Eritrea (complete list) –

Colony, 1890–1936
For details see Italy under southcentral Europe

Ethiopia

- Ethiopian Empire (complete list) –

- Yohannes III, Emperor (1850–1851)
- Sahle Dengel, Emperor (1851–1855)
- Tewodros II, Emperor (1855–1868)
- Tekle Giyorgis II, Emperor (1868–1871)
- Yohannes IV, Emperor (1871–1889)
- Menelik II, Emperor (1889–1913)

- Sultanate of Aussa (complete list) –

- Hanfere ibn Aydahis, Amoyta (1832–1862)
- Mahammad ibn Hanfere, Amoyta (1862–1902)

- Kingdom of Garo (complete list) –

- Ogata, Tato (1845–1865)
- Dagoye, Tato (1865–1883)

- Kingdom of Gera (complete list) –

- Abba Rago I, Moti(c.1845–c.1860)
- Abba Magal, Moti (c.1860–1870)
- Abba Rago II, Moti (c.1870)
- Genne Fa, Queen (c.1880)

- Kingdom of Gomma (complete list) –

- Abba Rebo, Moti (?–1856)
- Abba Dula, Moti (?–1864)
- Abba Jifar, Moti (late 19th century)
- Abba Boka, Moti (?–1886)

- Kingdom of Gumma (complete list) –

- Jawe, Moti (c.1840–1854)
- Abba Dula, Moti (1854–1879)
- Abba Jubir, Moti (June 1879–c.1890)
- Abba Fogi, Moti (c.1890–1899)
- Firisa, Moti (1899–1902)

- Emirate of Harar (complete list) –

- Abu Bakr II ibn ʽAbd al-Munan, Emīr (1834–1852)
- Ahmad III ibn Abu Bakr, Emīr (1852–1866)
- Muhammad ibn 'Ali 'Abd ash-Shakur, Emīr (1866–1875)
- 'Abd Allah II ibn 'Ali 'Abd ash-Shakur, Emīr (1884–1887)

- Kingdom of Janjero (complete list) –

- Abba Bagibo, Koynab (?–1894)

- Kingdom of Jimma (complete list) –

- Abba Jifar I, Moti (c.1830–c.1855)
- Abba Rebu, Moti (1855–1859)
- Abba Bok'a, Moti (1859–1862)
- Abba Gomol, Moti (1862–1878)
- Abba Jifar II, Moti (1878–1932)

- Kingdom of Kaffa (complete list) –

- Gawi Nechocho or Haji Ginoch, King (1845–1854)
- Kaye Sherocho or Kamo, King (1854–1870)
- Gali Sherocho, King (1870–1890)
- Gaki Sherocho, King (1890–1897)

- Leqa Neqemte (complete list) –

- Bekere Godana, Moti (1841–1868)
- Mereda Bekere, Moti (1871–1888)
- Kumsa Moroda, Moti (1888–1923)

- Kingdom of Limmu-Ennarea (complete list) –

- Ibsa, Abba Bagibo, Supera (1825–1861)
- Abba Bulgu, Supera (1861–1883)
- Abba Gomoli II, Supera (1883–1891)

- Welayta: Tigre dynasty (complete list) –

- Gobe, Kawa (1845–1886)
- Gaga, Kawa (1886–c.1890)
- Tona, Kawa (1890–1895)

Somalia

- Sultanate of the Geledi (complete list) –

- Ahmed Yusuf Mahamud, Sultan (1848–1878)
- Osman Ahmed, Sultan (1878–1911)

- Sultanate of Hobyo –

- Yusuf Ali Kenadid, Sultan (1878–1911)

- Majeerteen Sultanate (complete list) –

- Suldaan Maxamuud Suldaan Cismaan Suldaan Maxamuud, King (1844–1860)
- Osman Mahamuud, King (1860–c.1924)

- Isaaq Sultanate (complete list) –

- Hassan Farah, Sultan (1845–1870)
- Deria Hassan, Sultan (1870–1939)

- Italian Somaliland part of Italian East Africa (complete list) –

Colony, 1890–1936
For details see Italy under southcentral Europe

- British Somaliland (complete list) –

Protectorate, 1884–1940, 1941–1960
For details see the United Kingdom under British Isles, Europe

Indian Ocean

Comoros

- Sultanate of Mwali (complete list) –

- Mohamed bin Saidi Hamadi Makadara, Sultan (1865–1874)
- Djoumbé Fatima, Regent (1865–1868, 1871–1878)
- Joseph Lambert, Duc d'Imerina, Regent (1868–1871)
- Abderremane bin Saidi Hamadi Makadara, Sultan (1878–1885)
- Mohammed Shekhe, Sultan (1885–1886)
- Marjani bin Abudu Shekhe, Sultan (1886–1888)
- Salima Machamba Queen/Sultan (1888–1909)
- Fadeli bin Othman, Balia Juma, Abudu Tsivandini, Regents (1888–1889)
- Mahmudu bin Mohamed Makadara, Regent (1889–1897)

- Sultanate of Ndzuwani (complete list) –

- Salim bin Alawi, Sultan (1837–1852)
- Saidi Abdallah bin Salim, Sultan (1852–1891)
- Salim bin Abdalla, Sultan (1891–1891)
- Saidi Omar bin Saidi Hasan, Sultan (1891–1892)
- Saidi Mohamed bin Saidi Omar, Sultan (1892–1912)

- French Comoros (complete list) –

French protectorate, 1887–1908
For details see France under western Europe

Madagascar

- Merina Kingdom

- Monarchs (complete list) –

- Ranavalona I, Queen (1828–1861)
- Radama II, King (1861–1863)
- Rasoherina, Queen (1863–1868)
- Ranavalona II, Queen (1868–1883)
- Ranavalona III Queen (1883–1897)

- Prime ministers (complete list) –

- Rainiharo, Prime minister (1833–1852)
- Rainivoninahitriniony, Prime minister (1852–1864)
- Rainilaiarivony, Prime minister (1864–1895)
- Rainitsimbazafy, Prime minister (1895–1896)
- Rasanjy, Prime minister (1896–1897)

- Malagasy Protectorate (complete list) –

French protectorate, 1882–1897

- French Madagascar (complete list) –

Colony, 1897–1958
For details see France under western Europe

Mauritius

- British Mauritius (complete list) –

Colony, 1810–1968
For details see the United Kingdom under British Isles, Europe

Seychelles

- Colony of Seychelles

Part of British Mauritius, 1811–1903
For details see the United Kingdom under British Isles, Europe

=== Africa: Northcentral ===
Libya

Tunisia

- Beylik of Tunis

- Beys (complete list) –

- Ahmad I ibn Mustafa, Bey (1837–1855)
- Muhammad II ibn al-Husayn, Bey (1855–1859)
- Muhammad III as-Sadiq, Bey (1859–1882)
- Ali III ibn al-Husayn, Bey (1882–1902)

- Grand viziers (complete list) –

- Mustapha Khaznadar, Grand vizier (1837–1873)
- Hayreddin Pasha, Grand vizier (1873–1877)
- Mohammed Khaznadar, Grand vizier (1877–1878, 1881–1882)
- Mustapha Ben Ismaïl, Grand vizier (1878–1881)
- Aziz Bouattour, Grand vizier (1882–1907)

- French protectorate of Tunisia (complete list) –

Protectorate, 1881–1956
For details see France under western Europe

=== Africa: Northeast ===
Egypt

- Khedivate of Egypt

- Khedive (complete list) –

- Abbas Helmi I, Khedive (1848–1854)
- Sa'id, Khedive (1854–1863)
- Isma'il Pasha, Khedive (1863–1879)
- Tewfik Pasha, Khedive (1879–1892)
- Abbas II, Khedive (1892–1914)

- Prime ministers (complete list) –

- Nubar Pasha, Prime minister (1878–1879)
- Tewfik Pasha, Prime minister (1879)
- Mohamed Sherif Pasha, Prime minister (1879)
- Tewfik Pasha, Prime minister (1879)
- Riaz Pasha, Prime minister (1879–1881)
- Mohamed Sherif Pasha, Prime minister (1881–1882)
- Mahmoud Samy El Baroudy, Prime minister (1882)
- Raghib Pasha, Prime minister (1882)
- Mohamed Sherif Pasha, Prime minister (1882–1884)
- Nubar Pasha, Prime minister (1884–1888)
- Riaz Pasha, Prime minister (1888–1891)
- Mostafa Fahmy Pasha, Prime minister (1891–1893)
- Hussein Fakhry Pasha, Prime minister (1893)
- Riaz Pasha, Prime minister (1893–1894)
- Nubar Pasha, Prime minister (1894–1895)
- Mostafa Fahmy Pasha, Prime minister (1895–1908)

Sudan

- Sultanate of Darfur (complete list) –

- Muhammad al-Husayn, Sultan (1838–1873)
- Ibrahim, Sultan (1873–1874)
- Ali Dinar, Sultan (1898–1916)

- Mahdist State –

- Muhammad Ahmad, Mahdi (1881–1885)
- Abdallahi ibn Muhammad, Khalifa (1885–1899)

- Taqali (complete list) –

- Nasir, Mukūk (1843–c.1860)
- Adam I, Mukūk (c.1860–1884)

- Anglo-Egyptian Sudan (complete list / complete list) –

Condominium of the United Kingdom and Egypt, 1899–1956
For details see the United Kingdom and Egypt

=== Africa: Northwest ===
Algeria

- French Algeria (complete list) –

French Départements, 1830–1962
For details see France under western Europe

Morocco and Western Sahara

- Morocco: Alaouite dynasty (complete list) –

- Abd al-Rahman, Sultan (1822–1859)
- Mohammed IV, Sultan (1859–1873)
- Hassan I, Sultan (1873–1894)
- Abdelaziz, Sultan (1894–1908)

- Spanish Sahara, (complete list) –

Overseas territory, 1884–1975
For details see Spain in southwest Europe

=== Africa: South ===
Botswana

- Bechuanaland Protectorate (complete list) –

British protectorate, 1885–1966
For details see the United Kingdom under British Isles, Europe

Eswatini/ Swaziland

- Kingdom of Eswatini (Swaziland)

- Kings (complete list) –

- Mswati II, King (1840–1868)
- Dlamini IV, King (1875–1889)
- Ngwane V, King (1895–1899)

- tiNdlovukati (complete list) –

- Tsandzile Ndwandwe, Ndlovukati (1840–1875), Queen Regent (1868–1875)
- Sisile Khumalo, Ndlovukati (1875)
- Tibati Nkambule, Ndlovukati (1875–1894), Queen Regent (1889–1894)
- Labotsibeni Mdluli, Ndlovukati (1894–1925), Queen Regent (1899–1903) Queen Regent under British rule (1903–1921)

Lesotho

- Basutoland (complete list) –

Kingdom, 1822–1884
British colony, 1884–1966
For details see the United Kingdom under British Isles, Europe
- Paramount Chiefs (complete list) –

- Moshoeshoe I, King or Paramount Chief (1822–1870)
- Letsie I, Paramount Chief (1870–1891)
- Lerotholi, Paramount Chief (1891–1905)

Malawi

- British Central Africa Protectorate (complete list) –

British protectorate, 1893–1907
For details see the United Kingdom under British Isles, Europe

Mozambique

- Angoche Sultanate –

- Hasani Usufu, Sultan (1849–1861)
- Musa Mohammad Sahib Quanto, Sultan (?–1879)
- Umar Farelay (also known as Mahamuieva), Sultan (c.1890–1910)

- Gaza Empire (complete list) –

- Soshangane, ruler (1825–1858)
- Mzila, ruler (c.1864–c.1884)
- Gungunhana, ruler (c.1884–1895)

- Portuguese Mozambique (complete list) –

Colony, 1498–1972
For details see the Kingdom of Portugal under Southwest Europe

Namibia

- Gciriku (complete list) –

- Shimwemwe (1785–1805)

- German South West Africa (complete list) –

Colony, 1884–1915
For details see the German Empire under central Europe

South Africa

- Griqualand East –

- Adam Kok III, Kaptijn (c.1862–1875)

- Griqualand West –

- Andries Waterboer, Kaptijn (1820–1852)
- Nicolaas Waterboer, Kaptijn (1852–1880)

- Diggers Republic –

- Stafford Parker, President (1870–1871)

- Mthethwa Paramountcy –

- Jobe kaKhayi, Chief (?–1806)
- Dingiswayo, Chief (1806–1817)

- Nieuwe Republiek –

- Lucas Johannes Meijer, President (1884–1888)

- Orange Free State (complete list) –

- Jacobus Groenendaal, Acting State President (1854)
- Josias Philip Hoffman, State President (1854–1855)
- Jacobus Johannes Venter, Acting State President (1855)
- Jacobus Nicolaas Boshoff, State President (1855–1859)
- Esaias Reynier Snijman, Acting State President (1859–1860)
- Marthinus Wessel Pretorius, State President (1860–1863)
- Jacobus Johannes Venter, Acting State President (1863–1864)
- Johannes Henricus Brand, State President (1864–1888)
- Executive Committee: W. Collins, F.P. Schnehage, G.J. du Toit (1888)
- Pieter Jeremias Blignaut, Acting State President (1888–1889)
- Francis William Reitz, State President (1889–1895)
- Pieter Jeremias Blignaut, Acting State President (1895–1896)
- Martinus Theunis Steyn, State President (1896–1902)

- Cape Colony (complete list) –

British colony, 1795–1910
For details see the United Kingdom under British Isles, Europe

- Colony of Natal (complete list) –

British colony, 1843–1910
For details see the United Kingdom under British Isles, Europe

- South African Republic (complete list) –

- Schalk Willem Burger, Acting State President (1900–1902)

- Transvaal Colony (complete list) –

British colony, 1877–1881, 1902–1910
For details see the United Kingdom under British Isles, Europe

Zambia

- Barotseland (complete list) –

- Sebetwane, Morêna (1838–1851)
- Mamochisane, Morêna (1851)
- Sekeletu, Morêna (1851–1863)
- Mambili, Morêna (1863)
- Liswaniso, Morêna in rebellion (1863)
- Mbololo, Morêna (1863–1864)
- Sipopa Lutangu, Mbumu wa Litunga (1864–1876)
- Mowa Mamili, Regent (1876)
- Mwanawina II, Mbumu wa Litunga (1876–1878)
- Lubosi I, Mbumu wa Litunga (1878–1884)
- Akufuna Tatila, Mbumu wa Litunga (1884–1885)
- Sikufele (in rebellion) (1885)
- Lubosi I, Mbumu wa Litunga (1885–1916)

- Kazembe –

- Kapumba Mwongo Mfwama, Mwata (1850–1854)
- Chinyanta Munona, Mwata (1854–1862)
- Mwonga Nsemba, Mwata (1862–1870)
- Chinkonkole Kafuti, Mwata (1870–1872)
- Lukwesa Mpanga, Mwata (1872–1883, 1885–1886)
- Kanyembo Ntemena, Mwata (1883–1885, 1886–1904)

- Ngoni (complete list) –

- Mpezeni I, Paramount Chief (1848–1900)

Zimbabwe

- Mthwakazi –

- Mzilikazi (1820–1868)
- Lobengula (1868–1894)

- Company rule in Rhodesia by the British South Africa Company (complete list) –

Company rule, 1890–1924
- James Hamilton, Chairman
- Cecil Rhodes, Founder
- Alfred Beit, Director
For details see the United Kingdom under British Isles, Europe

- Rozvi Empire (complete list) –

- Changamire Tohwechipi Zharare, King (1831–1866)

=== Africa: West ===
Benin

- Kingdom of Agwe –

- Hanto Tona, King (1846–1858)
- Soji Komin Agidi, King (1858–1873)
- Atanle, King (1873–1889)
- Ahrlonko Butiyi, King (1889–1894)
- Kwasihela Diogo, King (1894–1895)

State annexed by France (1895)

- Kingdom of Benin (complete list) –

- Adolo, Oba (1848–1897)
See also Ovonramwen

- Kingdom of Dahomey (Dahomey kings) (French presidents) –

- Ghezo, King (1818–1858)
- Glele, King (1858–1889)
- Béhanzin, King (1889–1894)
French protectorate, 1894–1900
- Agoli-agbo, King (1894–1900)

- Hogbonu (complete list) –

- Sodji, Ahosu (1848–1864)
- Mikpon, Ahosu (1864–1872)
- Messi, Ahosu (1872–1874)
- Toffa I, Ahosu (1874–1908)

- Ketu (Benin) (complete list) –

- Ajibolu, Oba of Ketu (1795–1816)

Burkina Faso

- Kingdom of Koala (complete list) –

- Lansongi, King (?)
- Yencirima, King (?)
- Yenahmma, King (?–1878)
- Yenkuaga, King (c.1878–1917)

- Mossi Kingdom of Bilanga (complete list) –

Buricimba dynasty

- Labidiedo, Bilanbedo (?–1881)
- Haminari, Bilanbedo (1881–1883)
- Yendabri, Bilanbedo (1883–1887)
- Yaaparigu, Bilanbedo (1887–1919)

- Mossi Kingdom of Bilayanga (complete list) –

- Yempaabu, ruler (1890s–?)
- Yembuado, ruler (?)

- Mossi Kingdom of Bongandini (complete list) –

- Bantia, ruler (19th century)
- Yenkpaari, ruler (19th century)
- Yembrima, ruler (late 19th century–1897)
- Yentema, ruler (1897–1899)
- Hampandi, ruler (1899–1923)

- Mossi Kingdom of Con (complete list) –

- Bandigoo, ruler (19th century)
- Wurbendi, ruler (19th century)
- Yembuado, ruler (19th century)
- Baalisongi, ruler (19th century)
- Yenkoari, ruler (19th century)
- Yembrima, ruler (late 19th century–1889)
- Yensombu, ruler (1889–1892)
- Baahamma, ruler (1892–1905)

- Mossi Kingdom of Gurunsi (complete list) –

- Alfa Hano, ruler (c.1870–c.1874)
- Gazari, ruler (c.1874–1883)
- Babatu, ruler (1883–1899)
- Builsa Hamaria, ruler (1894–1897)

- Mossi Kingdom of Gwiriko (complete list) –

- Bako Moru Wattara, ruler (1839–1851)
- Laganfyela Moru, ruler (1851–1854)
- Ali Dyan, ruler (1854–1878)
- Kokoroko Dyan, ruler (1878–1885)
- Sabana, ruler (1885–1892)
- Tyeba Wattara Nyandane, ruler (1892–1897)
- Pintyeba Wattara, ruler (1897–1909)

- Mossi Kingdom of Liptako (complete list) –

- Brahima Sori bi Hama, Almami (1832–1861)
- Seku bi Salifu, Almami (1861–1887)
- Bubakar Amadu bi Isa, Almami (1887–1890)
- Bubakar bi Sori, Almami (1890–1891)
- Brahima Usman, Almami (1891–1915)

- Mossi Kingdom of Macakoali (complete list) –

- Yembrima, Boopo (19th century)
- Baahamma, Boopo (late 19th century)
- Yempaabu, Boopo (late 19th century)
- Labidiedo, Boopo (late 19th century–1887)
- Tintuoriba Adama, Boopo (1887–1896)
- Hampanli, Boopo (1896–1897)
- Huntani, Boopo (1897–1902)

- Mossi Kingdom of Nungu (complete list) –

- Yempabu, Nunbado (1846–1856)
- Yempadigu, Nunbado (1856–1883)
- Yentuguri, Nunbado (1883–1892)
- Bancandi, Nunbado (1892–1911)

- Mossi Kingdom of Piéla (complete list) –

- Yenkpaari, Pielabedo (1844–1851)
- Yencaari, Pielabedo (1851–1856)
- Yentandi, Pielabedo (1856–1901)

- Mossi Kingdom of Tenkodogo (complete list) –

- Sapilem, Naaba (19th century)
- Nyambre, Naaba (19th century)
- Salma, Naaba (19th century)
- Korongo, Naaba (1894)

- Mossi Kingdom of Wogodogo (complete list) –

- Naaba Kutu I, Moogo-naaba (1850–1871)
- Naaba Sanum, Moogo-naaba (1871–1889)
- Naaba Wobgo, Moogo-naaba (1889–1897)
- Naaba Mazi, Moogo-naaba (1896–1896)
- Naaba Sigiri, Moogo-naaba (1897–1905)

- Mossi Kingdom of Yatenga (complete list) –

- Rima Naaba Yemde, Yatenga naaba (1850–1877)
- Naaba Sanum, Yatenga naaba (1877–1879)
- Rima Naaba Woboga, Yatenga naaba (1879–1884)
- Naaba Piiyo II, Yatenga naaba (1884–1885)
- Rima Naaba Baongo, Yatenga naaba (1885–1895)
- Naaba Bulli, Yatenga naaba (1895–1899)
- Sidiyete Wedraogo, ruler (1895–1896)
- Naaba Ligidi, Yatenga naaba (1899–1902)

Cape Verde

- Portuguese Cape Verde (complete list) –

Colony, 1462–1951
For details see the Kingdom of Portugal under Southwest Europe

Gambia

- Gambia Colony and Protectorate (complete list) –

British colony and protectorate, 1821–1965
For details see the United Kingdom under British Isles, Europe

- Kombo (complete list) –

- Suling Jatta, King (pre-1840–1855)
- Tomani Bojang, King (?–1875)

Ghana

- Kingdom of Ashanti (complete list) –

- Kwaku Dua I Panyin, Asantehene (1834–1867)
- Kofi Karikari, Asantehene (1867–1874)
- Kwabena Dwomo, Regent (1874)
- Mensa Bonsu, Asantehene (1874–1883)
- Civil War period, (1883–1888)
- Kwaku Dua II, Asantehene (1884)
- Owusu Kofi, Interim Council Chairman (1884)
- Akyampon Panyin, Interim Council Chairman (1884–1887)
- Owusu Sekyere II, Regent (1887–1888)
- Prempeh I, Asantehene (1888–1902)

- Fante Confederacy (complete list) –
- Gold Coast (complete list) –

British colony, 1821–1957
For details see the United Kingdom under British Isles, Europe

Guinea

- Imamate of Futa Jallon (complete list) –

- Ibrahima Sori Dongolfella, Almami (?–1890)
- Bokar Biro's elder brother, Almami (1890–?)
- Bokar Biro, Almami (?–1892)
- Amadu, Almami (1892–1894)
- Bokar Biro, Almami (1894–1896)

- Wassoulou Empire –

- Samori Ture, Faama (1878–1898)

- French Guinea part of French West Africa (complete list) –

Colony, 1894–1958
For details see France under western Europe

Guinea-Bissau

- Kaabu –

- Janke Waali, ruler (1867)

- Portuguese Guinea (complete list) –

Colony, 1474–1951
For details see the Kingdom of Portugal under Southwest Europe

Ivory Coast

- Gyaaman (complete list) –

- Kwadwo Agyeman, Gyaamanhene (1850–1895)

- French Ivory Coast part of French West Africa (complete list) –

Colony, 1893–1960
For details see France under western Europe

Liberia

- Republic of Maryland (complete list) –

- John Brown Russwurm, Governor (1836–1851)
- Samuel Ford McGill, acting Governor (1851–1852), Governor (1852–1854)
- William A. Prout, Governor (1854–1856)
- Boston Jenkins Drayton, Governor (1856–1857)

- Liberia (complete list) –

- Joseph Jenkins Roberts, President (1848–1856)
- Stephen Allen Benson, President (1856–1864)
- Daniel Bashiel Warner, President (1864–1868)
- James Spriggs Payne, President (1868–1870)
- Edward James Roye, President (1870–1871)
- James Skivring Smith, President (1871–1872)
- Joseph Jenkins Roberts, President (1872–1876)
- James Spriggs Payne, President (1876–1878)
- Anthony W. Gardner, President (1878–1883)
- Alfred Francis Russell, President (1883–1884)
- Hilary R. W. Johnson, President (1884–1892)
- Joseph James Cheeseman, President (1892–1896)
- William D. Coleman, President (1896–1900)
- Garretson W. Gibson, President (1900–1904)

Mali

- Kaarta –

- Mamady Kandian, Fama (?–1854)
- Almany Niamody, Fama (?–1878)

- Toucouleur Empire

- El Hadj Umar Tall, ruler (1850–1864)
- Tidiani Tall, ruler (1864–1890)
- Ahmadu Tall, ruler (1890–1892)

- Kénédougou Kingdom –

- Mansa Douala, Faama (?–1876)
- Tieba Traoré, Faama (1876–1893)
- Babemba Traoré, Faama (1893–1898)

- Massina Empire –

- Amadu II, Almami (1845–1852)
- Amadu III, Almami (1852–1862)

- French Sudan part of French West Africa (complete list) –

Colony, 1880–1958
For details see France under western Europe

Mauritania

Niger

- Sultanate of Damagaram (complete list) –

- Ibrahim, Sultan (1843–1851)

- Dendi Kingdom: Askiya dynasty (complete list) –

- Koïzé Babba, Askiya (1845–1864)
- Koïzé Babba Baki, Askiya (1864–1865)
- Ouankoÿ, Askiya (1865–1868)
- Biyo Birma, Askiya (1868–1882)
- Doauda, Askiya (1882–1887)
- Malla, Askiya (1887–1901)

- Dosso Kingdom (complete list) –

- Zarmakoy Kassam/Kossom Baboukabiya, King (1856–1865)
- Zarmakoy Abdou Kyantou Baba, King (1865–1890)
- Zarmakoy Alfa Atta, King (1890–1897)
- Zarmakoy Attikou, King (1897–1902)

- Zabarima –

- Hanno, Emir (?)
- Gazari, Emir (?–1878)
- Babatu, Warlord (1878–?)

Nigeria

- Adamawa Emirate –

- Hamidu bi Adama, Regent (1847–?)
- Muhammadu Lawal, Baban-Lamido (1847–1872)
- Umaru Sanda, Baban-Lamido (1872–1890)
- Zubayru bi Adama, Baban-Lamido (1890–1901)

- Akwa Akpa (Old Calabar) –

- Effiom Okoho Asibong I Ekpo Minika, King (1849–1852)
- Ededem Effiom II, King (1852–1858)
- Eyo Asibong II, King (1859–1872)
- Edem Asibong III Eyamba VIII, King (1872–1879)
- Orok Edem Eyamba IX, King (1880–1896)
- Eyo Etinyin, King (c.1896–c.1903)

- Aro Confederacy

- Okoro Idozuka, leader (19th-century)

- Kingdom of Bonny –

- Opubo Annie Pepple the Great, King (1792–1828)
- Adumtaye-Bereibibo Adapa Bristol-Alagbariya, King (1828–1830)
- William Dappa Pepple I, King (1830–1854, 1861–1866)
- Dapu Fubara II Pepple, King (1854–1855)
- Regency (1855–1861)

under British protectorate from 1886–1914

- George Oruigbiji Pepple, King (1866–1883, 1887–1888)
- Waribo, Regent (1888–1892)
- Ate, Regent (1892–1914)

- Bornu Empire (Kanem–Bornu): House of Kanemi

- Umar Kura, Shehu (1837–1853, 1854–1881)
- 'Abd ar-Rahman ibn Muhammad al-Amin, Shehu (1853–1854)
- Bukar Kura, Shehu (1881–1884)
- Ibrahim Kura, Shehu (c.1884–c.1885)
- Ashimi, Shehu (c.1884–c.1885)
- Kyari, Shehu (1893–1894)
- Sanda Wuduroma, Shehu (1894)

- Borno Emirate / Empire

- Sanda Wuduroma, Shehu (1894)

- Egba Ake –

- Shomoye, Regent (1845–1846, 1862–1868)
- Okukenu, Regent (1846–1854), Alake (1854–1862)
- Ademola I, Alake (1869–1877)
- Oyekan, Alake (1879–1881)
- Oluwajin, Alake (1885–1889)
- Oshokalu, Alake (1891–1898)
- Gbadebo I, Alake (1898–1920)
- Ladapo Samuel Ademola II, Alake (1872–1962), in exile (1948–1950), ruler (1920–1962)

- Kano Emirate

- Emirs (complete list) –

- Usman I Maje Ringim dan Dabo, Emir (1846–1855)
- Abdullahi Maje Karofi dan Dabo, Emir (1855–1883)
- Muhammadu Bello dan Dabo, Emir (1883–1893)
- Mohammed Tukur, Emir (1893–1894)
- Aliyu Babba, Emir (1894–1903)

- Grand Viziers

- Ahmadu Mai Shahada, Grand Vizier (1889–1903)

- Ilorin Emirate –

- Shita dan Salih Alimi, Emir (1842–1860)
- Zubayro dan Abdusalami, Emir (1860–1868)
- Shita Aliyu dan Shittu, Emir (1868–1891)
- Moma dan Zubayru, Emir (1891–1896)
- Sulaymanu dan Aliyu, Emir (1896–1914)

- Lagos (complete list) –

- Kosoko, Oba (1845–1851)
- Dosunmu, Oba (1853–1862, becomes Lagos Colony)

- Nembe Kingdom (complete list) –

- Kien Mingi VI, King (1846–1863)
- Joshua Constantine Ockiya Mingi VII, King (1863–1879)
- Frederick William Koko Mingi VIII, King (1889–1896)

- Kingdom of Nri (complete list) –

- Ezimilo, Eze Nri (1795–1886)
- Òbalíke, Eze Nri (1889–1911)

- Nupe Kingdom (complete list) –

- Usuman Zaki dan Malam Dendo, Etsu (1856–1859)
- Masaba dan Malam Dendo, Etsu (1859–1873)
- Umaru Majigi dan Muhamman Majigi, Etsu (1873–1884)
- Maliki dan Usman Zaki, Etsu (1884–1895)
- Abu Bakr dan Masaba, Etsu (1895–1897, 1899–1901)
- Muhammadu dan Umaru Majigi, Etsu (1897–1899)

- Opobo (complete list)–

- Jaja), ruler (1870–1887)
- Perekule, chairman Council of Chiefs (1887–1891)
- Cookey Gam, political agent (1891–1893)
- Obiesigha Jaja II (Frederick Sunday), King (1893–1915)

- Oyo Empire (complete list) –

- Atiba Atobatele, Alaafin (1837–1859)
- Adelu, Alaafin (1859–1875)
- Adeyemi I Alowolodu, Alaafin (1876–1888), Oba (1888–1896)
vassal to the United Kingdom: 1888–1896

- Sokoto Caliphate

- Sultans (complete list) –

- Abdur Rahman Atiku, Sultan (1891–1902)

- Grand viziers (complete list) –

- Muhammadu al-Bukhari, Grand Vizier (1890–1903)

- Suleja Emirate (complete list) –

- Jatau "Abu Ja", Emir (1825–1851)
- Abu Kwaka "Dogon Sarki", Emir (1851–1877)
- Ibrahim "Iyalai" "Dodon Gwari", Emir (1877–1902)

- Yauri Emirate –

- Ya`quba dan Jibrilu Gajeren Sarki, Emir (1849–1850)
- Sulaymanu Dan Addo dan Ibrahimu, Emir (1850–1871)
- Abd Allahi Gallo dan Muhammadu Dan Ayi, Emir (1871–1888)
- Abd Allahi Abarshi dan 'Ali dan Yerima, Emir (1888–1904)

- Oil Rivers Protectorate/ Niger Coast Protectorate (complete list) –

British protectorate, 1884–1893/ 1893–1900

- Lagos Colony (complete list) –

British colony, 1821–1957

- Northern Nigeria Protectorate (complete list) –

British protectorate, 1900–1914

- Southern Nigeria Protectorate (complete list) –

British protectorate, 1900–1914
For details see the United Kingdom under British Isles, Europe

Senegal

- Baol (complete list) –

- Tanor Ngone Jeng, Teigne (1890–1894)

- Cayor (complete list) –

- Maysa Tènde Jor Samba Fal, Damel (1832–1855)
- Birima Ngone Latir Fal, Damel (1855–1860)
- Ma-Kodu Kumba Yande Fal, Damel (1860–1861)
- Ma-Jojo Jegeñ Kodu Fal, Damel (1861)
- Lat Jor Ngone Latir Jop, Damel (1862–1864)
- Ma-Jojo Jegeñ Kodu Fal, Damel (1864–1868)
- Lat Jor Ngone Latir Jop, Damel (1871–1882)
- Amari Ngone Fal, Damel (1883)
- Samba Laobe Fal, Damel (1883–1886)

- Imamate of Futa Toro (complete list) –

- unknown Almaami (1804–1859)
Vassal of the Toucouleur Empire, 1861–1877
- Mustafa, Almaami (1859–1868)
- Ahmadu Sego, Almaami (1868–1875)
- Abdul Bu Bakar, Almaami (1875–1877)

- Kingdom of Jolof (complete list) –

- Birayamb Ma-Dyigen, Buur-ba (1850–1855)
- al-Buri Peya, Buur-ba (1855–1856)
- Bakan-Tam Yaago, Buur-ba (1856–1858)
- Taanor, Buur-ba (1858–1863)
- Bakan-Tam Khaari, Buur-ba (1863–1871)
- Amadu Seeku, Buur-ba (1871–1875)
- Alboury Ndiaye, Buur-ba (1875–1890)

- Saloum (complete list) –

- Balleh N'Gougou N'Dao (or Ballé Khordia Ndao), Maad Saloum (1825–1853)
- Bala Adam Njie, Maad Saloum (1853–1856)
- Kumba N'Dama Mbodj, Maad Saloum (1856–1859)
- Samba Laobe Latsouka Fall), Maad Saloum (1859–1864)

- Kingdom of Sine (complete list) –

- Ama Joof Gnilane Faye Joof, Maad a Sinig (1825–1853)
- Kumba Ndoffene Famak Joof, Maad a Sinig (1853–1871)
- Kumba Ndoffene Fa Ndeb Joof, Maad a Sinig (1898–1924)
- M'Backeh Kodu Njie, Maad a Sinig (1884–1885)

- Waalo (complete list) –

- Mö Mboj Maalik Mboj, King (1840–1855)

- French Senegal (part of French West Africa) (1848–1960)
- French West Africa (complete list) –

Federation of colonies, 1895–1958
For details see France under western Europe

Sierra Leone

- Kingdom of Koya (complete list) –

- Moribu Kindo, Bai (1840–1859)
- Kanta, Bai (1859–1872)

- Sierra Leone Colony and Protectorate, British colony (complete list) –

British colony and protectorate, 1808–1961
For details see the United Kingdom under British Isles, Europe

Togo

- German Togoland (complete list) –

Protectorate, 1884–1916
For details see the German Empire under central Europe

== Americas ==
=== Americas: Caribbean ===
Antigua

- Colonial Antigua (complete list) –

British colony, 1632–1981
For details see the United Kingdom under British Isles, Europe

The Bahamas

- Colony of the Bahamas (complete list) –

British colony, 1648–1973
For details see the United Kingdom under British Isles, Europe

Barbados

- Colonial Barbados (complete list) –

British colony, 1625–1966
For details see the United Kingdom under British Isles, Europe

Cuba

- Captaincy General of Cuba (complete list) –

Spanish Colony, 1607–1898
For details see Spain in southwest Europe

Dominica

- British Dominica (complete list) –

British Colony, 1763–1978
For details see the United Kingdom under British Isles, Europe

Saint Vincent and the Grenadines

- Colonial Saint Vincent and the Grenadines (complete list) –

British Colony, 1763–1979
For details see the United Kingdom under British Isles, Europe

Dominican Republic

- First Dominican Republic (complete list) –

- Buenaventura Báez, President (1849–1853)
- Pedro Santana, President (1853–1856)
- Manuel de Regla Mota, President (1856)
- Buenaventura Báez, President (1856–1858)
- José Desiderio Valverde, President (1858)
- Pedro Santana, President (1858–1861)

- Second Dominican Republic (complete list) –

- Pedro Antonio Pimentel, President (1865)
- José María Cabral, Supreme Chief (1865)
- Pedro Guillermo, President of the Provisional Government Junta (1865)
- Buenaventura Báez, President (1865–1866)

- Pedro Antonio Pimentel, Gregorio Luperón, Federico de Jesús García, Triumvirate (1866)

- José María Cabral, President (1866–1868)
- Manuel Altagracia Cáceres, President (1868)

- José Antonio Hungría, Francisco Antonio Gómez Báez, José Ramón Luciano y Franco, Junta of Generals (1868)

- Buenaventura Báez, President (1868–1874)
- Ignacio María González, Supreme Chief (1874)

- Ignacio María González, Manuel Altagracia Cáceres, Generals-in-Chief (1874)

- Ignacio María González, President (1874–1876)

- Pedro Tomás Garrido, José de Jesús de Castro, Pedro Pablo de Bonilla, Juan Bautista Zafra, Pablo López Villanueva, Jacinto Peynado, Council of Secretaries of State (1876)

- Ulises Francisco Espaillat, President (1876)

- Pablo López Villanueva, José Caminero Matías, Juan Esteban Ariza Matos, Fidel Rodríguez Urdaneta, José de Jesús Eduardo de Castro Álvarez, Juan Bautista Zafra y Miranda, Pedro Tomás Garrido Matos, Superior Governing Junta (1876)

- Ignacio María González, Supreme Chief (1876)
- Marcos Antonio Cabral, President of the Provisional Government Junta (1876)
- Buenaventura Báez, President (1876–1878)

- José María Cabral, Joaquín Montolío, Council of Secretaries of State (1878)

- Cesareo Guillermo, President (1878)
- Ignacio María González, President (1878)

- Ulises Heureaux, Cesáreo Guillermo, People's Military Chiefs (1878)

- Jacinto de Castro, Acting President (1878)

- Cesáreo Guillermo, Alejandro Angulo Guridi, Pedro Maria Aristy, Council of Secretaries of State (1878–1879)

- Cesareo Guillermo, President (1879)
- Gregorio Luperón, President (1879–1880)
- Fernando Arturo de Meriño, President (1880–1882)
- Ulises Heureaux, President (1882–1884)
- Francisco Gregorio Billini, President (1884–1885)
- Alejandro Woss y Gil, President (1885–1887)
- Ulises Heureaux, President (1887–1889)
- Manuel María Gautier, Acting President (1889)
- Ulises Heureaux, President (1889–1899)
- Wenceslao Figuereo, President (1899)

- Tomás Demetrio Morales, Arístides Patiño, Enrique Henríquez y Alfau, Jaime R. Vidal, Braulio Álvarez, Council of Secretaries of State (1899)
- Mariano Cestero, Álvaro Logroño, Arístides Patiño, Pedro María Mejía, Council of Secretaries of State (1899)

- Horacio Vásquez, President of the Provisional Government Junta (1899)
- Juan Isidro Jimenes Pereyra, President (1899–1902)

Haiti

- Second Empire of Haiti (complete list) –

- Faustin Soulouque, President (1847–1849), Emperor (1849–1859)

- Second Haitian Republic (complete list) –

- Fabre Geffrard, President (1859–1867)
- Jean-Nicolas Nissage Saget, Provisional President (1867)
- Sylvain Salnave, President (1867–1869)
- Jean-Nicolas Nissage Saget, President (1869–1874)
- Council of Secretaries of State (1874)
- Michel Domingue, President (1874–1876)
- Pierre Théoma Boisrond-Canal, Provisional President (1876), President (1876–1879)
- Joseph Lamothe, Provisional President (1879)
- Lysius Salomon, President (1879–1888)
- Pierre Théoma Boisrond-Canal, Provisional President (1888)
- François Denys Légitime, President (1888–1889)
- Monpoint Jeune, Provisional President (1889)
- Florvil Hyppolite, President (1889–1896)
- Tirésias Simon Sam, President (1896–1902)

Netherlands

- Curaçao and Dependencies (complete list) –

Dutch colony 1634–1828, 1845–1954
For details see the Netherlands under western Europe

Saint Kitts and Nevis

- Saint Christopher-Nevis-Anguilla (complete list) –

British colony, 1882–1983
For details see the United Kingdom under British Isles, Europe

Saint Lucia

- Colonial Saint Lucia (complete list) –

British colony, 1802–1979
For details see the United Kingdom under British Isles, Europe

Trinidad and Tobago

- Colonial Trinidad and Tobago (complete list) –

British colony, 1797–1962
For details see the United Kingdom under British Isles, Europe

- Principality of Trinidad –

- James I, Prince (1893–1895)

=== Americas: Central ===
Belize

- Black River Settlements (complete list) –

British colony, 1749–1862
For details see the United Kingdom under British Isles, Europe

- British Honduras/ Colonial Belize (complete list) –

British colony, 1862–1981
For details see the United Kingdom under British Isles, Europe

Costa Rica

- First Costa Rican Republic (complete list) –

- Juan Mora Porras, President (1849–1859)
- José María Montealegre Fernández, President (1859–1863)
- Jesús Jiménez Zamora, President (1863–1866)
- José Castro Madriz, President (1866–1868)
- Jesús Jiménez Zamora, President (1868–1870)
- Bruno Carranza Ramírez, President (1870)
- Tomás Guardia Gutiérrez, President (1870–1876)
- Aniceto Esquivel Sáenz, President (1876)
- Vicente Herrera Zeledón, President (1876–1877)
- Tomás Guardia Gutiérrez, President (1877–1882)
- Saturnino Lizano Gutiérrez, President (1882)
- Próspero Fernández Oreamuno, President (1882–1885)
- Bernardo Soto Alfaro, President (1885–1890)
- José Rodríguez Zeledón, President (1890–1894)
- Rafael Yglesias Castro, President (1894–1902)

El Salvador

- El Salvador (complete list) –

- Doroteo Vasconcelos, President (1848–1850)
- Ramón Rodríguez, Acting President (1850)
- José Félix Quirós, Acting President (1850)
- Doroteo Vasconcelos, President (1850–1851)
- Francisco Dueñas, Acting President (1851)
- José Félix Quirós, Acting President (1851)
- Francisco Dueñas, Acting President (1851)
- Francisco Dueñas, Acting President (1851–1852)
- José María San Martín, Acting President (1852)
- Francisco Dueñas, President (1852–1854)
- Vicente Gómez, Acting President (1854)
- José María San Martín, President (1854)
- José Mariano Hernández, Acting President
- José María San Martín, President (1854–1856)
- Francisco Dueñas, Acting President (1856)
- Rafael Campo, President (1856)
- Francisco Dueñas, Acting President (1856)
- Rafael Campo, President (1856–1858)
- Lorenzo Zepeda, Acting President (1858)
- Miguel Santín del Castillo, President (1858)
- Gerardo Barrios, Acting President (1858)
- Miguel Santín del Castillo, President (1858–1859)
- Joaquín Eufrasio Guzmán, Acting President (1859)
- José María Peralta, Acting President (1859)
- Gerardo Barrios, President (1859–1860)
- José María Peralta, Acting President (1860–1861)
- Gerardo Barrios, President (1861–1863)
- Francisco Dueñas, President (1863–1871)
- Santiago González, President (1871–1872)
- Manuel Méndez, Acting President (1872)
- Santiago González, President (1872–1876)
- Andrés del Valle, President (1876)
- Rafael Zaldívar, President (1876–1884)
- Ángel Guirola, Acting President (1884)
- Rafael Zaldívar, President (1884–1885)
- Fernando Figueroa, Provisional President (1885)
- José Rosales, Acting President (1885)
- Francisco Menéndez, President (1885–1890)
- Carlos Ezeta, President (1890–1894)
- Rafael Antonio Gutiérrez, President (1894–1898)
- Tomás Regalado, President (1898–1903)

Guatemala

- Republic of Guatemala (complete list) –

- Mariano Peredes, Acting President (1849–1851)
- Rafael Carrera, President (1851–1865)
- Pedro de Aycinena y Piñol, Acting President (1865)
- Vicente Cerna Sandoval, President (1865–1871)
- Miguel García Granados, President (1871–1873)
- Justo Rufino Barrios, President (1873–1885)
- Alejandro M. Sinibaldi, Acting President (1885)
- Manuel Barillas, President (1885–1892)
- José María Reina Barrios, President (1892–1898)
- Manuel Estrada Cabrera, President (1898–1920)

Honduras

- Honduras (complete list) –

- Juan Lindo, President (1847–1852)
- Francisco Gómez, Acting President (1852)
- José Trinidad Cabañas, President (1852–1855)
- José Santiago Bueso, Acting President (1855)
- Francisco de Aguilar, Acting President (1855–1856)
- José Santos Guardiola, President (1856–1862)
- José Francisco Montes, Acting President (1862)
- Victoriano Castellanos, Acting President (1862)
- José Francisco Montes, Acting President (1862–1863)
- José María Medina, Acting President (1863)
- Francisco Inestroza, Acting President (1863–1864)
- Francisco Cruz Castro, Provisional President (1869–1870)
- José María Medina, President (1864–1872)
- Céleo Arias, Provisional President (1872–1874)
- Ponciano Leiva, President (1874–1876)
- Marcelino Mejía, Provisional President (1876)
- Crescencio Gómez, Provisional President (1876)
- José María Medina, Provisional President (1876)
- Marco Aurelio Soto, President (1876–1883)
- Council of Ministers, (1883)
- Luis Bográn, President (1883–1891)
- Ponciano Leiva, President (1891–1893)
- Domingo Vásquez, President (1893–1894)
- Policarpo Bonilla, President (1894–1899)
- Terencio Sierra, President (1899–1903)

Nicaragua

- Miskito Coast (complete list) –

- George Augustus Frederic II, King (1842–1865)
- William Henry Clarence, Hereditary Chief (1865–1879)
- George William Albert Hendy, Hereditary Chief (1879–1888)
- Andrew Hendy, Hereditary Chief (1888–1889)
- Jonathan Charles Frederick, Hereditary Chief (1889–1890)
- Robert Henry Clarence, Hereditary Chief (1890–1894)

- Nicaragua (complete list) –

- Norberto Ramírez Áreas, Supreme Director (1849–1851)
- Justo Abaunza y Muñoz de Avilés, Acting Supreme Director (1851)
- José Laureano Pineda Ugarte, Supreme Director (1851)
- Justo Abaunza y Muñoz de Avilés, Acting Supreme Director (1851)
- José Laureano Pineda Ugarte, Supreme Director, in dissidence (1851)
- José Francisco del Montenegro, Acting Supreme Director, in rebellion (1851)
- José de Jesús Alfaro, Supreme Director, in rebellion (1851)
- José Laureano Pineda Ugarte, Supreme Director, in dissidence (1851–1853)
- Fruto Chamorro, Supreme Director (1853–1854)
- Fruto Chamorro, President (1854–1855)
- José María Estrada, Acting President (1855)
- Patricio Rivas, Provisional President (1855–1857)
- William Walker, Usurper (1856–1857)
- Government Junta, President (1857)
- Tomás Martínez, President (1857–1867)
- Fernando Guzmán Solórzano, President (1867–1871)
- José Vicente Cuadra, President (1871–1875)
- Pedro Joaquín Chamorro Alfaro, President (1875–1879)
- Joaquín Zavala, President (1879–1883)
- Adán Cárdenas, President (1883–1887)
- Evaristo Carazo, President (1887–1889)
- Nicolás Osorno, Acting President (1889)
- Roberto Sacasa, Acting President (1889–1891)
- Ignacio Chaves López, President (1891)
- Roberto Sacasa, President (1891–1893)
- Salvador Machado, Acting President (1893)
- Joaquín Zavala, Acting President (1893)
- José Santos Zelaya, President (1893–1909)

=== Americas: North ===
Canada

- Newfoundland Colony (complete list) –

British colony, 1610–1907

- Province of Canada (complete list) –

British colony, 1841–1867
For details see the United Kingdom under British Isles, Europe

- Canada

- Monarchs (complete list) –

- Victoria, Queen (1867–1901)

- Prime ministers (complete list) –

- John A. Macdonald, Prime minister (1867–1873, 1878–1891)
- Alexander Mackenzie, Prime minister (1873–1878)
- John Abbott, Prime minister (1891–1892)
- John Sparrow David Thompson, Prime minister (1892–1894)
- Mackenzie Bowell, Prime minister (1894–1896)
- Charles Tupper, Prime minister (1896)
- Wilfrid Laurier, Prime minister (1896–1911)

Mexico

- Second Federal Republic of Mexico (complete list) –

- José Joaquín de Herrera, President (1848–1851)
- Mariano Arista, President (1851–1853)
- Juan Bautista Ceballos, President (1853)
- Manuel María Lombardini, President (1853)
- Santa Anna, Dictator-President (1853–1855)
- Martín Carrera, President (1855)
- Rómulo Díaz de la Vega, President (1855)
- Juan Álvarez, President (1855)
- Ignacio Comonfort, President (1855–1857)
- Benito Juárez, President (1857–1872)
- Ignacio Comonfort, President (1857–1858)
- Félix María Zuloaga, Interim President (1858)
- Manuel Robles Pezuela, Provisional President (1858–1859)
- José Mariano Salas, Provisional President (1859)
- Miguel Miramón, Substitute President (1859–1860)
- José Ignacio Pavón, Substitute President (1860)
- Miguel Miramón, Provisional President (1860)
- Félix María Zuloaga, Provisional President (1860–1862)

- Republic of Sonora –

- William Walker, President (1853–1854)

- Second Mexican Empire (complete list) –

- Juan Almonte, José Mariano Salas, Pelagio Antonio de Labastida, Regents of the Mexican Empire (1863–1864)
- Maximilian I, Emperor (1864–1867)

- United Mexican States (complete list) –

- Benito Juárez, President (1857–1872)
- Sebastián Lerdo de Tejada, President (1872–1876)
- José María Iglesias, President (1876)
- Porfirio Díaz, President (1876)
- Juan Nepomuceno Méndez, President (1876–1877)
- Porfirio Díaz, President (1877–1880)
- Manuel González Flores, President (1880–1884)
- Porfirio Díaz, President (1884–1911)

United States

- United States (complete list) –

- Millard Fillmore, President (1850–1853)
- Franklin Pierce, President (1853–1857)
- James Buchanan, President (1857–1861)
- Abraham Lincoln, President (1861–1865)
- Andrew Johnson, President (1865–1869)
- Ulysses S. Grant, President (1869–1877)
- Rutherford B. Hayes, President (1877–1881)
- James A. Garfield, President (1881)
- Chester A. Arthur, President (1881–1885)
- Grover Cleveland, President (1885–1889)
- Benjamin Harrison, President (1889–1893)
- Grover Cleveland, President (1893–1897)
- William McKinley, President (1897–1901)

- Cherokee Nation (complete list) –

- John Ross, Principal Chief (1828–1866)
- Stand Watie, dissident Chief (1862–1866)
- William P. Ross, Principal Chief (1866–1867, 1872–1875)
- Lewis Downing, Principal Chief (1867–1872)
- Charles Thompson, Principal Chief (1875–1879)
- Dennis Bushyhead, Principal Chief (1879–1887)
- Joel B. Mayes, Principal Chief (1887–1891)
- Johnson Harris, Principal Chief (1891–1895)
- Samuel Houston Mayes, Principal Chief (1895–1899)
- Thomas Buffington, Principal Chief (1899–1903)

- Confederate States of America –

- Jefferson Davis, President (1862–1865)

=== Americas: South ===
Argentina

- Argentine Confederation (complete list) –

- Justo José de Urquiza, Provisional Director (1852–1854), President (1854–1860)
- Santiago Derqui, President (1860–1861)
- Juan Esteban Pedernera, President (1861)

- Argentine Republic (complete list) –

- Bartolomé Mitre, President (1862–1868)
- Domingo Faustino Sarmiento, President (1868–1874)
- Nicolás Avellaneda, President (1874–1880)
- Julio Argentino Roca, President (1880–1886)
- Miguel Juárez Celman, President (1886–1890)
- Carlos Pellegrini, President (1890–1892)
- Luis Sáenz Peña, President (1892–1895)
- José Evaristo Uriburu, President (1895–1898)
- Julio Argentino Roca, President (1898–1904)

Bolivia

- Republic of Bolivia (complete list) –

- Manuel Isidoro Belzu, Provisional President (1848–1850), President (1850–1855)
- Jorge Córdova, President (1855–1857)
- José María Linares, Provisional President (1857–1858), Dictator for Life (1858–1861)
- Government Junta, Members: Ruperto Fernández, José María Achá, Manuel Antonio Sánchez (1861)
- José María Achá, Provisional President (1861–1862), President (1862–1864)
- Mariano Melgarejo, Provisional President (1864–1870), President (1870–1871)
- Agustín Morales, Supreme Chief of the Revolution (1871), Provisional President (1871–1872), President (1872)
- Tomás Frías Ametller, President (1872–1873)
- Adolfo Ballivián, President (1873–1874)
- Tomás Frías Ametller, President (1874–1876)
- Hilarión Daza, President (1876–1879)
- Pedro José Domingo de Guerra, President (1879)
- Narciso Campero, President (1880–1884)
- Gregorio Pacheco, President (1884–1888)
- Aniceto Arce, President (1888–1892)
- Mariano Baptista, President (1892–1896)
- Severo Fernández, President (1896–1899)
- Government Junta, Members: José Manuel Pando, Serapio Reyes Ortiz, Macario Pinilla Vargas (1899)
- José Manuel Pando, President (1899–1904)

Brazil

- Empire of Brazil (complete list) –

- Pedro II, Emperor (1831–1889)

- First Brazilian Republic (complete list) –

- Deodoro da Fonseca, President (1889–1891)
- Floriano Peixoto, President (1891–1894)
- Prudente de Morais, President (1894–1898)
- Campos Sales, President (1898–1902)

- Republic of Acre (pt:complete list) –

- Luis Gálvez Rodrígues de Arias, President (1899–1900, 1900)
- Antônio de Sousa Braga, President (1900)
- Joaquim Vítor da Silva, President (1900)

Chile

- Conservative Republic of Chile (complete list) –

- Manuel Bulnes, President (1841–1851)
- Manuel Montt, President (1851–1861)

- Liberal Republic of Chile (complete list) –

- José Joaquín Pérez, President (1861–1871)
- Federico Errázuriz Zañartu, President (1871–1876)
- Aníbal Pinto, President (1876–1881)
- Domingo Santa María, President (1881–1886)
- José Manuel Balmaceda, President (1886–1891)

- Parliamentary Era Chile (complete list) –

- Jorge Montt, President (1891–1896)
- Federico Errázuriz Echaurren, President (1896–1901)

- Kingdom of Araucanía and Patagonia –

- Orélie-Antoine de Tounens, King (1860–1862)

Colombia

- Republic of New Granada (complete list) –

- José Hilario López, President (1849–1853)
- José María Obando, President (1853–1854)
- José María Melo, President (1854)
- Mariano Ospina Rodríguez, President (1857–1858)

- Granadine Confederation (complete list) –

- Mariano Ospina Rodríguez, President (1858/1868–1861)
- Juan José Nieto Gil, President (1861)
- Bartolomé Calvo, President (1861)
- Tomás Cipriano de Mosquera, President (1861–1863, 1863–1864)

- United States of Colombia (complete list) –

- Tomás Cipriano de Mosquera, President (1861–1863, 1863–1864, 1866–1867)
- Manuel Murillo Toro, President (1864–1866)
- Joaquín Riascos, President (1867)
- Santos Acosta, President (1867–1868)
- Santos Gutiérrez, President (1868–1870)
- Eustorgio Salgar, President (1870–1872)
- Manuel Murillo Toro, President (1872–1874)
- Santiago Pérez de Manosalbas, President (1874–1876)
- Aquileo Parra, President (1876–1878)
- Julián Trujillo Largacha, President (1878–1880)
- Rafael Núñez, President (1880–1882, 1884–1886, 1886–1894)
- Francisco Javier Zaldúa, President (1882)
- Clímaco Calderón, President (1882)
- José Eusebio Otalora, President (1882–1884)
- Ezequiel Hurtado, President (1884)

- Republic of Colombia (complete list) –

- Rafael Núñez, President (1880–1882, 1884–1886, 1886–1894)
- Miguel Antonio Caro, President (1894–1898)
- Manuel Antonio Sanclemente, President (1898–1900)
- José Manuel Marroquín, President (1900–1904)

Ecuador

- Republic of Ecuador (complete list) –

- Diego Noboa, Interim President (1850–1851), President (1851)
- José María Urvina, Jéfe Supremo (1851–1852), President (1852–1856)
- Francisco Robles, President (1856–1859)
- Provisional Government of Quito, Members: Gabriel García Moreno, Jerónimo Carrión, Plácido Chiriboga, Rafael Carvajal (1859–1861)
- Government of Cuenca, Leaders: Jerónimo Carrión, Francisco Robles, Guillermo Franco, Ramón Borrero (1859)
- Supreme Leadership of Guayas, Leader: Guillermo Franco (1859–1860)
- Federal Government of Loja, Leader: Manuel Carrión Pinzano (1859–1860)
- Gabriel García Moreno, Interim President (1861), President (1861–1865)
- Rafael Carvajal, Acting President (1865)
- Jerónimo Carrión, President (1865–1867)
- Pedro José de Arteta, Acting President (1867–1868)
- Javier Espinosa, President (1868–1869)
- Gabriel García Moreno, Interim President (1869)
- Manuel de Ascásubi, Interim President (1869)
- Gabriel García Moreno, President (1869–1875)
- Francisco Xavier León, Interim President (1875)
- José Javier Eguiguren, Interim President (1875)
- Antonio Borrero, President (1875–1876)
- Ignacio de Veintemilla, Jéfe Supremo (1876–1878), President (1878–1882), Jéfe Supremo (1882–1883)
- Pentevirato Quiteño, Members: José María Plácido Caamaño, Luis Cordero, Agustín Guerrero, Pedro Lizarzaburu, Rafael Pérez Pareja (1883)
- Supreme Leadership of Manabí and Esmeraldas, Leader: Eloy Alfaro (1883)
- Supreme Leadership of Guayas, Leader: Pedro Carbo (1883)
- José Plácido Caamaño, Interim President (1883–1884), President (1884–1888)
- Pedro José Cevallos, Acting President (1888)
- Antonio Flores Jijón, President (1888–1892)
- Luis Cordero Crespo, President (1892–1895)
- Vicente Lucio Salazar, Acting President (1895)
- Eloy Alfaro, Jéfe Supremo (1895–1896), Interim President (1896–1897), President (1897–1901)

Guyana

- British Guiana (complete list) –

British colony, 1814–1966
For details see the United Kingdom under British Isles, Europe

Paraguay

- Republic of Paraguay (complete list) –

- Carlos Antonio López, President (1844–1862)
- Francisco Solano López, President (1862–1869)
- Cirilo Antonio Rivarola, President (1869–1870)
- Facundo Machaín, Acting President (1870)
- Cirilo Antonio Rivarola, President (1870–1871)
- Salvador Jovellanos, President (1871–1874)
- Juan Bautista Gill, President (1874–1877)
- Higinio Uriarte, President (1877–1878)
- Cándido Bareiro, President (1878–1880)
- Bernardino Caballero, President (1880–1886)
- Patricio Escobar, President (1886–1890)
- Juan Gualberto González, President (1890–1894)
- Marcos Morínigo, President (1894)
- Juan Bautista Egusquiza, President (1894–1898)
- Emilio Aceval, President (1898–1902)

Peru

- Republic of Peru (complete list) –

- Ramón Castilla, President (1845–1851)
- José Rufino Echenique, President (1851–1855)
- Ramón Castilla, President (1855–1862)
- Miguel de San Román, President (1862–1863)
- Ramón Castilla, President (1863)
- Pedro Diez Canseco, President (1863)
- Juan Antonio Pezet, President (1863–1865)
- Mariano Ignacio Prado, President (1865)
- Juan Antonio Pezet, President (1865)
- Pedro Diez Canseco, President (1865)
- Mariano Ignacio Prado, President (1865–1868)
- Pedro Diez Canseco, Interim caretaker (1868)
- José Balta, President (1868–1872)
- Tomás Gutiérrez, Supreme Leader of the Nation (1872)
- Francisco Diez Canseco, President (1872)
- Mariano Herencia Zevallos, President (1872)
- Manuel Pardo, President (1872–1876)
- Mariano Ignacio Prado, President (1876–1879)
- Nicolás de Piérola, Commander in Chief of the State (1879–1881)
- Francisco García Calderón, Provisional President of the Republic (1881)
- Lizardo Montero Flores, Provisional President of the Republic (1881)
- Miguel Iglesias, Regenerator President of the Republic (1881–1885)
- Antonio Arenas, President of the Government Junta (1885–1886)
- Andrés Avelino Cáceres, Constitutional President (1886–1890)
- Remigio Morales Bermúdez, Constitutional President (1890–1894)
- Justiniano Borgoño, President of the Government Junta (1894)
- Andrés Avelino Cáceres, Constitutional President (1894–1895)
- Manuel Candamo, President of the Government Junta (1895)
- Nicolás de Piérola, Constitutional President (1895–1899)
- Eduardo López de Romaña, Constitutional President (1899–1903)

Suriname

- Dutch Surinam (complete list) –

Dutch colony 1667–1954
For details see the Netherlands under western Europe

Uruguay

- Oriental Republic of Uruguay (complete list) –

- Manuel Oribe, Disputed with Joaquín Suárez (1843–1851)
- Joaquín Suárez, Acting, Disputed with Manuel Oribe (1841–1852)
- Bernardo Berro, Acting (1852)
- Juan Francisco Giró, President (1852–1853)
- Juan Antonio Lavalleja, Triumvir, President (1853) (1853)
- Fructuoso Rivera, Triumvir (1853–1859), President (1853–1854) (1853–1859)
- Venancio Flores, Triumvir, President, disputed (1854–1855) (1853–1854)
- Luis María Lamas, Acting President, disputed (1855)
- Manuel Basilio Bustamante, Acting President (1855–1856)
- José María Piá, Acting President (1856)
- Gabriel Antonio Pereira, President (1856–1860)
- Bernardo Berro, President (1860–1864)
- Atanasio Aguirre, Acting President (1864–1865)
- Tomás Villalba, Acting President (1865)
- Venancio Flores, Acting President (1865–1868)
- Pedro Varela, Acting President (1868)
- Lorenzo Batlle y Grau, President (1868–1872)
- Tomás Gomensoro Albín, Acting President (1872–1873)
- José Eugenio Ellauri, President (1873–1875)
- Pedro Varela, President (1875–1876)
- Lorenzo Latorre, President (1876–1880)
- Francisco Antonino Vidal, President (1880–1882)
- Máximo Santos, President (1882–1886)
- Francisco Antonino Vidal, President (1886)
- Máximo Santos, President (1886)
- Máximo Tajes, President (1886–1890)
- Julio Herrera y Obes, President (1890–1894)
- Duncan Stewart, Acting President (1894)
- Juan Idiarte Borda, President (1894–1897)
- Juan Lindolfo Cuestas, Acting President (1897–1899)
- José Batlle y Ordóñez, Acting President (1899)
- Juan Lindolfo Cuestas, President (1899–1903)

Venezuela

- State of Venezuela (complete list) –

- José Tadeo Monagas, President (1847–1851)
- José Gregorio Monagas, President (1851–1855)
- José Tadeo Monagas, President (1855–1858)
- Pedro Gual Escandón, Interim President (1858)
- Julián Castro, President (1858–1859)
- Pedro Gual Escandón, Interim President (1859)
- Manuel Felipe de Tovar, President (1859–1861)
- Pedro Gual Escandón, Interim President (1861)
- José Antonio Páez, President (1861–1863)
- Juan Crisóstomo Falcón, President (1863–1868)

- United States of Venezuela (complete list) –

- Juan Crisóstomo Falcón, President (1863–1868)
- Manuel Ezequiel Bruzual, Interim President (1868)
- Guillermo Tell Villegas, Interim President (1868–1869)
- José Ruperto Monagas, President (1869–1870)
- Guillermo Tell Villegas, Interim President (1870)
- Antonio Guzmán Blanco, President (1870–1877)
- Francisco Linares Alcántara, President (1877–1878)
- José Gregorio Valera, Interim President (1878–1879)
- Antonio Guzmán Blanco, President (1879–1884)
- Joaquín Crespo, President (1884–1886)
- Antonio Guzmán Blanco, President (1886–1887)
- Hermógenes López, Interim President (1887–1888)
- Juan Pablo Rojas Paúl, President (1888–1890)
- Raimundo Andueza Palacio, President (1890–1892)
- Guillermo Tell Villegas, Interim President (1892)
- Guillermo Tell Villegas Pulido, Interim President (1892)
- Joaquín Crespo, President (1892–1898)
- Ignacio Andrade, President (1898–1899)
- Cipriano Castro, President (1899–1908)

== Asia ==
=== Asia: Central ===
Kazakhstan

Tibet

- Tibet under Qing rule (Qing emperors / Dalai Lamas) –

Manchu overlordship, 1720–1912
For details see the Qing dynasty under Eastern Asia

Uzbekistan

- Khanate of Kokand –

- Muhammad Khudayar, Khan (1845–1858)
- Muhammad Mallya Beg, Khan (1858–1862)
- Shah Murad, Khan (1862)
- Muhammad Khudayar Khan (1862–1865)
- Muhammad Sultan, Khan (1863–1865)
- Bil Bahchi, Khan (1865)
- Muhammad Sultah, Khan (1865–1866)
- Muhammad Khudayar, Khan (1866–1875)
- Nasir ad-Din Abdul Karin, Khan (1875)
- Muhammad Pulad Beg, Khan (1875–1875)
- Nasir ad-Din Abdul Karim, Khan (1875–1883)

- Khanate of Khiva (complete list) –

- Abu al-Ghazi Muhammad Amin Bahadur, Khan (1846–1855)
- Abdullah, Khan (1855)
- Qutlugh Muhammad Murad Bahadur, Khan (1855–1856)
- Mahmud, Khan (1856)
- Sayyid Muhammad, Khan (1856–1864)
- Muhammad Rahim Bahadur II., Khan (Feruz Khan), Khan (1864–1910)

- Emirate of Bukhara –

- Nasr-Allah bin Haydar Tora, Amir (1827–1860)
Russian protectorate, 1873–1917
- Muzaffar al-Din bin Nasr-Allah, Amir (1860–1885)
- Abdul-Ahad bin Muzaffar al-Din, Amir (1885–1910)

- Russian Turkestan (complete list) –

Russian Krai, 1867–1918
For details see the Russian Empire under Eastern Europe

=== Asia: East ===
China: Mainland

- Qing dynasty (complete list) –

- Xianfeng, Emperor (1850–1861)
- Tongzhi, Emperor (1861–1875)
- Guangxu, Emperor (1875–1908)

- Taiping Heavenly Kingdom –

- Hong Xiuquan, Heavenly King (1851–1864)
- Hong Tianguifu, Heavenly King (1864)

China: Taiwan

- Republic of Formosa –

- Tang Jingsong, President (1895)
- Liu Yongfu, de facto President (1895)

Japan

- Tokugawa shogunate of Japan

- Emperors (complete list) –

- Kōmei, Emperor (1846–1867)
- Meiji, Emperor (1867–1912)

- Shōgun (complete list) –

- Tokugawa Ieyoshi, Shōgun (1837–1853)
- Tokugawa Iesada, Shōgun (1853–1858)
- Tokugawa Iemochi, Shōgun (1858–1866)
- Tokugawa Yoshinobu, Shōgun (1867–1868)

- Empire of Japan

- Emperors (complete list) –

- Meiji, Emperor (1867–1912)

- Prime ministers (complete list) –

- Itō Hirobumi, Prime minister (1885–1888)
- Kuroda Kiyotaka, Prime minister (1888–1889)
- Sanjō Sanetomi, Acting Prime minister (1889–1889)
- Yamagata Aritomo, Prime minister (1889–1891)
- Matsukata Masayoshi, Prime minister (1891–1892)
- Itō Hirobumi, Prime minister (1892–1896)
- Kuroda Kiyotaka, Acting Prime minister (1896–1896)
- Matsukata Masayoshi, Prime minister (1896–1898)
- Itō Hirobumi, Prime minister (1898–1898)
- Ōkuma Shigenobu, Prime minister (1898–1898)
- Yamagata Aritomo, Prime minister (1898–1900)
- Itō Hirobumi, Prime minister (1900–1901)

- Ryukyu Kingdom: Second Shō dynasty –

Vassal state of Satsuma Domain, 1609–1872
Vassal state of the Empire of Japan, 1872–1879
- Shō Tai, King (1848–1879)

- Republic of Ezo –

- Enomoto Takeaki, President (1869)

Korea

- Joseon (complete list) –

- Cheoljong, King (1849-1863)
- Gojong, King (1863–1897), Emperor (1897–1907)

- Korean Empire (complete list) –

- Gojong, King (1863–1897), Emperor (1897–1907)

=== Asia: Southeast ===
Brunei

- Bruneian Empire (complete list) –

- Omar Ali Saifuddin II, Sultan (1828–1852)
- Abdul Momin, Sultan (1852–1885)
- Hashim Jalilul Alam Aqamaddin, Sultan (1885–1906)

- Protectorate of Brunei (complete list) –

British protectorate, 1888–1984
- Hashim Jalilul Alam Aqamaddin, Sultan (1885–1906)

Cambodia

- Kingdom of Cambodia: Middle Period (complete list) –

- Ang Duong, King (1841–1860)
- Norodom, King (1860–1904)

- French Protectorate of Cambodia (complete list) –

Protectorate, 1863–1984, part of French Indochina 1887–1953
- Norodom, King (1860–1904)

Indonesia

- Dutch East Indies (complete list) –

Dutch colony 1800–1811, 1816–1949
For details see the Netherlands under western Europe

Indonesia: Java

- Sultanate of Cirebon: Kraton Kacirebonan (complete list) –

- Cirebon IV, Sultan (1808–1810)

- Bangkalan –

- Cakraningrat IX, Sultan (1847–1862)
- Cakraningrat X, Sultan (1862–1882)
- Cakraningrat XI, Sultan (1882–1885)

- Sumenep –

- Paku Nataningrat, Sultan (1811–1854)
- Natakusuma, Sultan (1854–1879)
- Pangeran Pakunataningrat, Regent (1883–1901)

- Pamekasan –

- Pangeran Aria Suriokusumo, Sultan (1842–1853)

- Surakarta Sunanate (complete list) –

- Pakubuwono VII, Sultan (1830–1858)
- Pakubuwono VIII, Sultan (1858–1861)
- Pakubuwono IX, Sultan (1861–1893)
- Pakubuwono X, Sultan (1893–1939)

- Yogyakarta Sultanate (complete list) –

- Hamengkubuwono V, Sultan (1822–1826, 1828–1855)
- Hamengkubuwono VI, Sultan (1855–1877)
- Hamengkubuwono VII, Sultan (1877–1921)

- Mangkunegaran (complete list) –

- Mangkunegara III, Sultan (1835–1853)
- Mangkunegara IV, Sultan (1853–1881)
- Mangkunegara V, Sultan (1881–1896)
- Mangkunegara VI, Sultan (1896–1916)

- Kalibawang –

- Pangeran Adipati Natapraja, Sultan (1831–1853)

- Pakualaman (complete list) –

- Pakualam II, Sultan (1829–1858)
- Pakualam III, Sultan (1858–1864)
- Pakualam IV, Sultan (1864–1878)
- Pakualam V, Sultan (1878–1900)

Indonesia: Sumatra

- Aceh Sultanate (complete list) –

- Alauddin Sulaiman Ali Iskandar Syah, Sultan (1838–1857)
- Alauddin Ibrahim Mansur Syah, Sultan (1857–1870)
- Alauddin Mahmud Syah II, Sultan (1870–1874)
- Alauddin Muhammad Da'ud Syah II, Sultan (1874–1903)

- Johor Sultanate (complete list) –

- Ali, Sultan (1835–1855)

- Sultanate of Deli (complete list) –

- Amaluddin Mangendar, Sultan (1805–1850)
- Osman Perkasa Alam Shah, Sultan (1850–1858)
- Mahmud Al Rashid Perkasa Alamsyah, Sultan (1858–1873)
- Ma'mun Al Rashid Perkasa Alamyah, Sultan (1873–1924)

- Sultanate of Langkat –

- Haji Musa al-Khalid al-Mahadiah Muazzam Shah, Sultan (1840–1893)
- Abdul Aziz Abdul Jalil Rakhmat Shah, Sultan (1893–1927)

- Sultanate of Siak Sri Indrapura (complete list) –

- al-Sayyid al-Sharif Ismail Abdul Jalil Jalaluddin, Sultan (1815–1854)
- al-Sayyid al-Sharif Qasim Abdul Jalil Syaifuddin I, Sultan (Syarif Qasim I, 1864–1889)
- al-Sayyid al-Sharif Hashim Abdul Jalil Muzaffar Shah, Sultan (1889–1908)

- Sultanate of Serdang (complete list) –

- Al-Marhum Besar, Sultan (1822–1851)
- Al-Marhum Kota Batu, Sultan (1851–1879)
- Al-Marhum Perbaungan, Sultan (1879–1946)

- Riau-Lingga Sultanate

- Sultans –

- Mahmud IV Muzaffar Shah, Sultan (1842–1858)
- Sulaiman II Badrul Alam Shah, Sultan (1858–1883)
- Abdul Rahman II Muazzam Shah, Sultan (1883–1911)

- Yang di-Pertuan Mudas –

- Ali bin Raja Jaafar, Yang di-Pertuan Muda (1844–1857)
- Haji Abdullah, Yang di-Pertuan Muda (1857–1858)
- Muhammad Yusuf, Yang di-Pertuan Muda (1858–1899)

- Jambi Sultanate –
  Abdul Rahman Nazaruddin, Sultan (1841–1855)
  Thaha Safiuddin, Sultan (1855–1858, 1900–1904)
  Ahmad Nazaruddin, Sultan (1858–1881)
  Muhammad Muhieddin, Sultan (1881–1885)
  Ahmad Zainul Abidin, Sultan (1885–1899)

Indonesia: Kalimantan (Borneo)

- Sultanate of Banjar (complete list) –

- Adam Al-Watsiq Billah, Sultan (1825–1857)
- Tamjidullah II al-Watsiqu Billah, Sultan (1857–1859)
- Hidayatullah II, Sultan (1859–1860)

- Sultanate of Bulungan –

- Muhammad Alimuddin Amirul Muminin Kahharuddin I, Sultan (1817–1861, 1866–1873)
- Muhammad Jalaluddin, Sultan (1861–1866)
- Muhammad Khalifatul Adil, Sultan (1873–1875)
- Muhammad Kahharuddin II, Sultan (1875–1889)
- Azimuddin, Sultan (1889–1899)
- Pengian Kesuma, Queen (1899–1901)

- Lanfang Republic –

- Liu Asheng, President (1848–1876)

- Pontianak Sultanate (complete list) –

- Syarif Osman Alkadrie, Sultan (1819–1855)
- Syarif Hamid Alkadrie, Sultan (1855–1872)
- Syarif Yusuf Alkadrie, Sultan (1872–1895)
- Syarif Muhammad Alkadrie, Sultan (1895–1944)

- Sultanate of Sambas (complete list) –

- Abu Bakar Taj ud-din II, Sultan (1846–1854)
- Umar Kamal ud-din, Sultan (1854–1866)
- Muhammad Shafi ud-din II, Sultan (1866–1924)

- Sultanate of Sintang –

- Sri Paduka Muhammad Qamar ud-din ibni al-Marhum Sultan 'Abdu'l Rashid Muhammad Jamal ud-din, Sultan (1796–1851)
- Sri Paduka Sultan Muhammad Jamal ud-din II ibni al-Marhum Sultan Muhammad Qamar ud-din Sultan (1851–1855)
- Panembahan Kusuma Negara I, Panembahan (1855–1889)
- Panembahan Kusuma Negara II, Panembahan (1889–1905)

Indonesia: Sulawesi

- Sultanate of Gowa –

- Abdul Kadir Moh Aidid, Sultan (1826–1893)
- Idris, Sultan (1893–1895)
- Husain, Sultan (1895–1906)

- Luwu –

- La Oddang Pero, Datu (1825–1854)
- Patipatau, Datu (1854–1880)
- We Addi Luwu, Datu (1880–1883)
- Iskandar Opu Daeng Pali', Datu (1883–1901)

Indonesia: Lesser Sunda Islands

- Kingdom of Larantuka –

- Lorenzo II, Raja (c.1886–1904)

- Bima Sultanate (complete list) –

- Ismail Muhammad Syah, Sultan (1817–1854)
- Abdullah, Sultan (1854–1868)
- Abdul Aziz, Sultan (1868–1881)
- Ibrahim, Sultan (1881–1915)

Indonesia: West Timor

- Amanatun (complete list) –

- Loit Banu Naek, Raja (?–c.1899)
- Muti Banu Naek, Raja (c.1899–1915)

- Amarasi (complete list) –

- Koroh Kefi, Raja (pre-1832–1853)
- Obe Koroh, Raja (1853–1871)
- Rasi Koroh, Raja (1872–1887, 1892–1914)
- Taku Obe, Raja (1888–1891)

- Amabi (complete list) –

- Osu II, Raja (1834–1859)
- Mano, Raja (1859–1883)
- Lelo, Raja (1884–1894)
- Kusa, Raja (1895–1901)

- Sonbai Besar (complete list) –

- Nai Sobe Sonbai II, Emperor (1808–1867))
- Nai Bau Sonbai, Emperor (1867–c.1885)
- Nai Nasu Mollo, co-Emperor (1870–1885)
- Nai Sobe Sonbai III, Emperor (1885–1906)

- Sonbai Kecil (complete list) –

- Meis Babkas Nisnoni, Raja (1839–1860)
- Pieter Messi Nisnoni, Raja (1860–1874)
- Isu Nisnoni, Raja (1875–1889)
- Said Meis Nisnoni, Raja (1890–1902)

- Amanuban (complete list) –

- Baki, Raja (c.1824–1862)
- Sanu, Raja (1862–c.1870)
- Bil Nope, Raja (c.1870–1910)

Indonesia: Maluku Islands

- Sultanate of Bacan (complete list) –

Dutch protectorate, 1667–1942
- Muhammad Hayatuddin Kornabé, Sultan (1826–1861)
- Muhammad Sadik, Sultan (1862–1889)
- Muhammad Usman, Sultan (1900–1935)

- Sultanate of Jailolo –

- Dano Baba Hasan, Sultan (1875–1878)

- Sultanate of Tidore (complete list) –

Dutch protectorate, 1657–1905
- Al-Mansur Sirajuddin, Sultan (1822–1856)
- Ahmad Saifuddin Alting, Sultan (1856–1865)
- Said Ahmad Fathuddin Syah, Sultan (1867–1892)
- Iskandar Sahajuhan, Sultan (1893–1905)

- Sultanate of Ternate (complete list) –

Dutch protectorate, 1683–1915
- Muhammad Zain, Sultan (1823–1859)
- Muhammad Arsyad, Sultan (1859–1876)
- Ayanhar, Sultan (1879–1900)
- Muhammad Ilham/ Kolano Ara Rimoi, Sultan (1900–1902)

Laos

- Muang Phuan (complete list) –

- Po, King (1848–1865), vassal to Siam and Vietnam
- Ung, King (1866–1876)
- Khanti, King (1876–1880), vassal to Siam
- Kham Ngon, King (1880–1899)

- Kingdom of Champasak (complete list) –

- Nark, King (1841–1851)
- Kham Nai, King (1856–1858)
- Kham Souk, King (1863–1899)
- Ratsadanay, King (1900–1904), Regional Governor (1904–1934)

- Kingdom of Luang Phrabang (complete list) –

- Soukhaseum, King (1838–1851)
- Chantharath, King (1851–1870)
- Oun Kham, King (1865–1893), King under Protectorate (1893–1895)

- French Protectorate of Luang Phrabang (complete list) –

Protectorate and constituent of French Indochina (1893–1953)
- Oun Kham, King (1865–1895)
- Zakarine, King (1895–1904)

Malaysia

Peninsular Malaysia

- Kedah Sultanate (complete list) –

- Zainal Rashid Al-Mu'adzam Shah I, Sultan, (1845–1854)
- Ahmad Tajuddin Mukarram Shah, Sultan, (1854–1879)
- Zainal Rashid Mu'adzam Shah II, Sultan, (1879–1881)
- Abdul Hamid Halim Shah ll, Sultan, (1881–1943)

- Kelantan Sultanate: Patani dynasty (complete list) –

- Muhammad II, Sultan (1835–1886)
- Ahmad, Sultan (1886–1890)
- Muhammad III Ibni Sultan Ahmad, Sultan (1890–1891)
- Mansur Ibni Sultan Ahmad, Sultan (1891–1900)
- Muhammad IV Ibni Sultan Muhammad III, Sultan (1900–1920)

- Perak Sultanate: Siak dynasty (complete list) –

- Shahabuddin Riayat Shah, Sultan (1830–1851)
- Abdullah Muhammad Shah I, Sultan (1851–1857)
- Ja’afar Safiuddin Mu’azzam Shah, Sultan (1857–1865)
- Ali Al-Mukammal Inayat Shah, Sultan (1865–1871)
- Ismail Mu’abidin Riayat Shah, Sultan (1871–1874)
- Abdullah Muhammad Shah II, Sultan (1874–1876)
- Yusuf Sharifuddin Muzaffar Shah, Sultan (1886–1887), Regent (1877–1886)
- Idris Murshidul Azzam Shah, Sultan (1887–1916)

- Terengganu Sultanate (complete list) –

- Omar Riayat Shah, co-Sultan (1831), Sultan (1839–1876)
- Mahmud Mustafa Shah, Sultan (1876–1877)
- Ahmad Muadzam Shah II, Sultan (1876–1881)
- Zainal Abidin III, Sultan (1881–1918)

- Selangor Sultanate (complete list) –

- Muhammad Shah, Sultan (1826–1857)
- Abdul Samad, Sultan (1857–1896)
- Sulaiman, Sultan (1896–1937)

- Negeri Sembilan (complete list) –

- Radin, Yamtuan (1824–1861)
- Imam, Yamtuan (1861–1869)
- Tengku Ampuan Intan, Regent (1869–1872)
- Antah, Yamtuan (1875–1888)
- Muhammad, Yamtuan (1888–1933)

- Perlis (complete list) –

- Syed Hussein Jamalullail, Penghulu (1825–1843), Raja (1843–1873)
- Syed Ahmad Jamalullail, Raja (1873–1887)
- Syed Saffi Jamalullail, Raja (1887–1905)

- Federated Malay States (complete list) –

British protectorate, 1895–1942, 1945–1946

- Unfederated Malay States (complete list) –

British protectorate, 1826–1942, 1945–1946

- Straits Settlements (complete list) –

British protectorate, 1826–1942, 1945–1946
For details see the United Kingdom under British Isles, Europe

Malaysian Borneo

- Kingdom of Sarawak (complete list) –

- James Brooke, Rajah (1842–1868)
- Charles Brooke, Rajah (1868–1917)

- Crown Colony of Labuan (complete list) –

British colony, 1848–1890, 1904–1906, 1907–1941, 1945–1946

- North Borneo (complete list) –

British colony, 1888–1941, 1945–1946; Crown colony, 1946–1963
For details see the United Kingdom under British Isles, Europe

Myanmar / Burma

- Konbaung dynasty (complete list) –

- Pagan, King (1846–1853)
- Mindon, King (1853–1878)
- Thibaw, King (1878–1885)

Philippines

- Sultanate of Sulu (complete list) –

- Mohammad Pulalun Kiram, Sultan (1844–1862)
- Jamal ul-Azam, Sultan (1862–1881)
- Badar ud-Din II, Sultan (1881–1884)
- Harun Ar-Rashid, Sultan (1886–1894)
- Jamalul Kiram II, Sultan (1894–1915)

- Sultanate of Maguindanao (complete list) –

- Untong, Sultan (c.1830–c.1854)
- Muhammad Makakwa, Sultan (c.1854–1884)
- Wata, Sultan (?–c.1888)
- Mangigin, Sultan (1896–1926)

- Spanish East Indies, part of the Captaincy General of the Philippines (complete list) –

Colony, 1565–1901
For details see Spain in southwest Europe

- Tagalog Republic Nation –

- Andrés Bonifacio, President (1896–1897)

- Republic of Biak-na-Bato –

- Emilio Aguinaldo, President (1897)

- Dictatorial Government of the Philippines –

- Emilio Aguinaldo, Dictator (1898)

- Republic of Negros –

- Aniceto Lacson, President (1898–1899)

- Republic of Zamboanga –

- Vicente Álvarez, President (1899)

- Revolutionary Government of the Philippines (1898–1899) (complete list) –

- Emilio Aguinaldo, President of the Revolutionary Government (1898–1899), President of the First Republic (1899–1901)

- First Philippine Republic

- Presidents (complete list) –

- Emilio Aguinaldo, President of the Revolutionary Government (1898–1899), President of the First Republic (1899–1901)

- Prime ministers (complete list) –

- Apolinario Mabini, Prime minister (1899)
- Pedro Paterno, Prime minister (1899)

Singapore

- Colony of Singapore (complete list) –

British colony as part of the Straits Settlements, 1819–1867
British crown colony as part of the Straits Settlements, 1867–1963
For details see the United Kingdom under British Isles, Europe

Thailand

- Rattanakosin Kingdom of Siam (complete list) –

- Rama III, King (1824–1851)
- Mongkut, King (1851–1868)
- Chulalongkorn, King (1868–1910)

- Kingdom of Chiang Mai (complete list) –

- Mahotaraprathet, King (1847–1854 )
- Kawilorot Suriyawong, King (1856–1870)
- Inthawichayanon, King (1870–1897)

- Pattani Kingdom (complete list) –

Second Kelantanese dynasty

- Phraya Long Muhammad Ibni Raja Muda Kelantan/Raja Kampong Laut Tuan Besar Long Ismail Ibni Raja Long Yunus, Sultan (1842–1856)
- Tuan Long Puteh Bin Phraya Long Muhammad, ruler (1856–1881)
- Tuan Besar Bin Tuan Long Puteh, ruler (1881–1890)
- Tuan Long Bongsu Bin Sultan Phraya Long Muhammad, ruler (1890–1898)
- Abdul Kadir Kamaruddin Syah, Sultan (1899–1902)

Timor

- Portuguese Timor (complete list) –

Colony, 1702–1975
For details see the Kingdom of Portugal under Southwest Europe

Vietnam

- Đại Việt

Tây Sơn dynasty (complete list) –
Nguyễn dynasty (complete list) –

- Việt Nam: Nguyễn dynasty (complete list) –

- Tự Đức, Emperor (1847–1883)
- Dục Đức, Emperor (1883)
- Hiệp Hòa, Emperor (1883–1883)
- Kiến Phúc, Emperor (1883–1884)
- Hàm Nghi, Emperor (1884–1885)
- Đồng Khánh, Emperor (1885–1889)
- Thành Thái, Emperor (1889–1907)

- French Indochina (complete list) –

Colony, 1887–1946
Vietnamese constituents are below; for details see France under western Europe
- Cochinchina

French Colony, 1862–1949

- Annam Protectorate

French Protectorate, 1883–1945, 1945–1948

- Tonkin Protectorate

French Protectorate, 1884–1949

For details see France under western Europe

=== Asia: South ===
Afghanistan

- Durrani Empire (complete list) –

- Ali Shah Durrani, Emir (1818–1819)
- Ayub Shah Durrani, Emir (1819–1823)

- Emirate of Afghanistan: Barakzai dynasty (complete list) –

- Dost Mohammad Khan, Emir (1826–1839, 1845–1863)
- Sher Ali Khan, Emir (1863–1866, 1867–1879)
- Mohammad Afzal Khan, Emir (1865–1867)
- Mohammad Azam Khan, Emir (1867–1868)
- Mohammad Yaqub Khan, Emir (1879)
- Ayub Khan, Emir (1879–1880)
- Abdur Rahman Khan, Emir (1880–1901)

=== Asia: West ===
Bahrain

- Hakims of Bahrain (complete list) –

Protectorate of the United Kingdom, 1861–1971
- Muhammad ibn Khalifah Al Khalifa, Hakim (1843–1868)
- Ali ibn Khalifah Al Khalifa, Hakim (1868–1869)
- Muhammad ibn Khalifah Al Khalifa, Hakim (1869)
- Muhammad ibn Abdullah Al Khalifa, Hakim (1869)
- Isa ibn Ali Al Khalifa, Hakim (1869–1923)

Cyprus

- British Cyprus (complete list) –

Colony, 1878–1960
For details see the United Kingdom under British Isles, Europe

Iran

- Persia: Qajar dynasty (complete list) –

- Naser al-Din, Shah (1848–1896)
- Mozaffar al-Din, Shah (1896–1907)

Iraq

Kuwait

- Sheikhdom of Kuwait (complete list) –

- Jaber I, Sheikh (1814–1859)
- Sabah II, Sheikh (1859–1866)
- Abdullah II, Sheikh (1866–1893)
- Muhammad I, Sheikh (1893–1896)
- Mubarak I, Sheikh (1896–1915)

Oman

- Omani Empire and Imamate of Oman: Al Busaidi dynasty (complete list) –

- Said bin Sultan, Sultan (1804–1856)

- Sultanate of Muscat and Oman: Al Busaidi dynasty (complete list) –

- Thuwaini, Sultan (1856–1866)
- Salim II, Sultan (1866–1868)
- Azzan, Sultan (1868–1871)
- Turki, Sultan (1871–1888)
- Faisal, Sultan (1888–1913)

Qatar

- Qatar (complete list) –

- Mohammed bin Thani, Emir (1847–1876)
- Jassim bin Mohammed Al Thani, Emir (1878–1913)

Saudi Arabia

- Emirate of Nejd (complete list) –

- Faisal bin Turki bin Abdullah Al Saud, Imam (1834–1838, 1843–1865)
- Abdallah ibn Faisal ibn Turki, Imam (1865–1871, 1871–1873, 1876–1889)
- Saud ibn Faisal, Imam (1871–1871, 1873–1875)
- Abdul Rahman bin Faisal, Imam (1875–1876, 1889–1891)

- Emirate of Jabal Shammar –

- Ṭalāl bin ʿAbdullah, Emir (1848–1868)
- Mutʿib bin ʿAbdullah, Emir (1868–1869)
- Bandar ben Talal al-Rachid, Emir (1869)
- Muḥammad bin ʿAbdullah, Emir (1869–1897)
- Abdul-Aziz bin Mitab, Emir (1897–1906)

Turkey

- Ottoman Empire

- Sultans –

- Abdülmecid I, Sultan (1839–1861)
- Abdülaziz, Sultan (1861–1876)
- Murad V, Sultan (1876)
- Abdul Hamid II, Sultan (1876–1909)

- Grand Viziers –

- Mustafa Reşid Pasha, Grand Vizier (1848–1852)
- Mehmed Emin Rauf Pasha, Grand Vizier (1852)
- Mustafa Reşid Pasha, Grand Vizier (1852)
- Mehmed Emin Âli Pasha, Grand Vizier (1852)
- Damat Mehmed Ali Pasha, Grand Vizier (1852–1853)
- Mustafa Naili Pasha, Grand Vizier (1853–1854)
- Kıbrıslı Mehmed Emin Pasha, Grand Vizier (1854)
- Mustafa Reşid Pasha, Grand Vizier (1854–1855)
- Mehmed Emin Âli Pasha, Grand Vizier (1855–1856)
- Mustafa Reşid Pasha, Grand Vizier (1856–1857)
- Mustafa Naili Pasha, Grand Vizier (1857)
- Mustafa Reşid Pasha, Grand Vizier (1857–1858)
- Mehmed Emin Âli Pasha, Grand Vizier (1858–1859)
- Kıbrıslı Mehmed Emin Pasha, Grand Vizier (1859)
- Mehmed Rushdi Pasha, Grand Vizier (1859–1860)
- Kıbrıslı Mehmed Emin Pasha, Grand Vizier (1860–1861)
- Mehmed Emin Âli Pasha, Grand Vizier (1861)
- Mehmed Fuad Pasha, Grand Vizier (1861–1866)
- Yusuf Kamil Pasha, Grand Vizier (1863)
- Mehmed Fuad Pasha, Grand Vizier (1863–1866)
- Mehmed Rushdi Pasha, Grand Vizier (1866–1867)
- Mehmed Emin Âli Pasha, Grand Vizier (1866–1871)
- Mahmud Nedim Pasha, Grand Vizier (1871–1872)
- Midhat Pasha, Grand Vizier (1872)
- Mehmed Rushdi Pasha, Grand Vizier (1872–1873)
- Ahmed Esad Pasha, Grand Vizier (1873)
- Şirvanlızade Mehmed Rüşdi Pasha, Grand Vizier (1873–1874)
- Hüseyin Avni Pasha, Grand Vizier (1874–1875)
- Ahmed Esad Pasha, Grand Vizier (1875)
- Mahmud Nedim Pasha, Grand Vizier (1875–1876)
- Mehmed Rushdi Pasha, Grand Vizier (1876–1876)
- Midhat Pasha, Grand Vizier (1876–1877)
- Ibrahim Edhem Pasha, Grand Vizier (1877–1878)
- Ahmed Hamdi Pasha, Grand Vizier (1878)
- Ahmed Vefik Pasha, Grand Vizier (1878)
- Mehmed Sadık Pasha, Grand Vizier (1878)
- Mehmed Rushdi Pasha, Grand Vizier (1878)
- Saffet Pasha, Grand Vizier (1878)
- Hayreddin Pasha, Grand Vizier (1878–1879)
- Ahmed Arifi Pasha, Grand Vizier (1879)
- Mehmed Said Pasha, Grand Vizier (1879–1880)
- Kadri Pasha, Grand Vizier (1880)
- Mehmed Said Pasha, Grand Vizier (1880–1882)
- Abdurrahman Nureddin Pasha, Grand Vizier (1882)
- Mehmed Said Pasha, Grand Vizier (1882)
- Ahmed Vefik Pasha, Grand Vizier (1882)
- Mehmed Said Pasha, Grand Vizier (1882–1885)
- Kâmil Pasha, Grand Vizier (1885–1891)
- Ahmed Cevad Pasha, Grand Vizier (1891–1895)
- Mehmed Said Pasha, Grand Vizier (1895)
- Kâmil Pasha, Grand Vizier (1895)
- Halil Rifat Pasha, Grand Vizier (1895–1901)

United Arab Emirates: Trucial States

- Sheikhdom of Abu Dhabi –

- Saeed bin Tahnun Al Nahyan, ruler (1845–1855)
- Zayed bin Khalifa Al Nahyan, ruler (1855–1909)

- Sheikhdom of Dubai –

- Maktoum bin Butti bin Suhail, ruler (1833–1852)
- Saeed bin Butti, ruler (1852–1859)
- Hasher bin Maktoum, ruler (1859–1886)
- Rashid bin Maktoum, ruler (1886–1894)
- Maktoum bin Hasher Al Maktoum, ruler (1894–1906)

- Sheikhdom of Sharjah –

- Sultan bin Saqr Al Qasimi, ruler (1803–1866)
- Khalid bin Sultan Al Qasimi, ruler (1866–1868)
- Salim bin Sultan Al Qasimi, ruler (1868–1883)
- Saqr bin Khalid Al Qasimi, ruler (1883–1914)

- Sheikhdom of Ajman –

- Humaid bin Rashid Al Nuaimi, ruler (1848–1864)
- Rashid bin Humaid Al Nuaimi II, ruler (1864–1891)
- Humaid bin Rashid Al Nuaimi II, ruler (1891–1900)
- Abdulaziz bin Humaid Al Nuaimi, ruler (1900–1910)

- Sheikhdom of Umm Al Quwain –

- Rashid bin Majid Al Mualla, ruler (1768–1820)
- Abdullah bin Rashid Al Mualla, ruler (1820–1853)
- Ali bin Abdullah Al Mualla, ruler (1853–1873)
- Ahmad bin Abdullah Al Mualla, ruler (1873–1904)

- Sheikhdom of Fujairah –

- Hamad bin Abdullah Al Sharqi, ruler (1879–1936)

- Sheikhdom of Ras Al Khaimah –

- Ibrahim bin Sultan Al Qasimi, ruler (1866–1867)
- Khalid bin Sultan Al Qasimi, ruler (1867–1868)
- Salim bin Sultan Al Qasimi, ruler (1868–1869)
- Humaid bin Abdullah Al Qasimi, ruler (1869–1900)
- Saqr bin Khalid Al Qasimi, ruler (1900–1914)

Yemen

- Upper Aulaqi Sheikhdom (complete list) –

- 'Amm Dayb ibn 'Ali al-Yaslami al-'Awlaqi, Amir (?)
- Ruways ibn 'Amm Dayb al-Yaslami al-'Awlaqi, Amir (?)
- Nasir ibn Ruways al-Yaslami al-'Awlaqi, Amir (?)
- Farid ibn Nasir al-Yaslami al-'Awlaqi, Amir (c.1871–1883)
- Ruways ibn Farid al-Yaslami al-'Awlaqi, Amir (1883–1890)
- 'Amm Rassas ibn Farid al-Yaslami al-'Awlaqi, Amir (1890–1902)

- Upper Aulaqi Sultanate (complete list) –

- 'Abd Allah ibn Farid, Sultan (?–1862)
- 'Awad ibn 'Abd Allah, Sultan (1862–1879)
- 'Abd Allah ibn 'Awad, Sultan (1879–1887)
- Salih ibn 'Abd Allah, Sultan (1887–1935)

- Emirate of Beihan (complete list) –

- Thaifallah, Amir (?)
- Mubarak, Amir (?)
- Muhsin, Amir (?–1903)

- Emirate of Dhala (complete list) –

- Shafa`ul ibn 'Abd al-Hadi al-'Amiri, Emir (?–1872)
- 'Ali ibn Muqbil al-'Amiri, Emir (1872–1873, 1874, 1878–1886)
- Muhammad ibn Musa`id al-'Amiri, Emir (1873–1873)
- 'Abd Allah ibn Muhammad al-'Amiri, Emir (1874–1878)
- Sha´if ibn Sayf al-'Amiri, Emir (1886–1911)

- Kathiri (complete list) –

- Ghalib ibn Muhsin al-Kathir, Sultan (1830–1880)
- al-Mansur ibn Ghalib al-Kathir, Sultan (1880–1929)

- Sultanate of Lahej –

- 'Ali I ibn Muhsin al-'Abdali, Sultan (1849–1863)
- al-Fadl III ibn 'Ali al-'Abdali, Sultan (1863–1863, 1874–1898)
- al-Fadl IV ibn Muhsin al-'Abdali, Sultan (1863–1874)
- Ahmad III ibn al-Fadl al-'Abdali, Sultan (1898–1914)

- Mahra Sultanate –

- Ahmad ibn Sa`d Afrar al-Mahri, Sultan (mid-19th century)
- 'Abd Allah ibn Sa`d Afrar al-Mahri, Sultan (mid-19th century)
- 'Abd Allah ibn Salim Afrar al-Mahri, Sultan (mid-19th century)
- 'Ali ibn 'Abd Allah Afrar al-Mahri, Sultan (late-19th century–1907)

- Wahidi Balhaf of Ba´l Haf (complete list) –

- al-Husayn ibn 'Abd Allah, Sultan (?)
- 'Abd Allah ibn al-Husayn, Sultan (?)
- Ahmad ibn al-Husayn al-Wahidi, Sultan (?–1877)
- Salih ibn Ahmad, Sultan (1877–1881)
- 'Umar ibn al-Husayn al-Wahidi, Sultan (1881–1881)

- Wahidi Balhaf of 'Azzan (complete list) –

- Muhsin ibn 'Ali al-Wahidi, Sultan (1850–1870)
- 'Abd Allah ibn 'Umar al-Wahidi, Sultan (1870–1881)

- Wahidi Balhaf of Ba´l Haf and 'Azzan (complete list) –

- 'Abd Allah ibn 'Umar, Sultan (1881–1885)
- al-Hadi ibn Salih al-Wahidi, Sultan (1885–1892)
- Muhsin ibn Salih al-Wahidi, Sultan (1892–1893)
- Salih ibn 'Abd Allah al-Wahidi, Sultan (1893–1904)

- Wahidi Haban (complete list) –

- 'Abd Allah ibn al-Husayn al-Wahidi, Sultan (1850–1870)
- Ahmad ibn al-Husayn al-Wahidi, Sultan (1870–1877)
- Salih ibn Ahmad al-Wahidi, Sultan (1877–1881)
- Nasir ibn Salih al-Wahidi, Sultan (1885–1919)

- Lower Yafa –

- Ahmad ibn Ali al-Afifi, ruler (1841–1873, 1891–1893)
- Ali II ibn Ahmad al-Afifi, ruler (1873–1885)
- Muhsin I ibn Ahmad al-Afifi, ruler (1885–1891)
- Abu Bakr ibn Sha'if al-Afifi, ruler (1893–1899)
- Abd Allah ibn Muhsin al-Afifi, ruler (1899–1916)

- Upper Yafa –

- 'Abd Allah ibn Nasir ibn Salih Al Harhara, Sultan (c.1840–1866)
- al-Husayn ibn Abi Bakr ibn Qahtan Al Harhara, Sultan (1866–1875)
- Muhammad ibn 'Ali ibn Salih ibn Ahmad Al Harhara, Sultan (1875–1895)
- Qahtan ibn 'Umar ibn al-Husayn Al Harhara, Sultan (1895–1903)

== Europe ==
=== Europe: Balkans ===
Bulgaria

- Principality of Bulgaria (complete list) –

- Alexander I, Prince (1878–1887)
- Ferdinand I, Prince (1887–1908), Tsar (1908–1918)

Croatia

- Kingdom of Croatia (Habsburg)

part of the Habsburg monarchy, also part of the Lands of the Hungarian Crown

- Kings (complete list) –

- Franz Joseph, King (1848–1916)

- Bans (complete list) –

- Josip Jelačić, Ban (1848–1859)
- Johann Baptist Coronini-Cronberg, Ban (1859–1860)
- Josip Šokčević, Ban (1860–1867)
- Levin Rauch, Ban (1867–1871)

- Kingdom of Croatia-Slavonia

part of the Austrian Empire

- Kings (complete list) –

- Franz Joseph, King (1848–1916)

- Bans (complete list) –

- Levin Rauch, Ban (1867–1871)
- Koloman Bedeković, Ban (1871–1872)
- Antun Vakanović, Ban (1872–1873)
- Ivan Mažuranić, Ban (1873–1880)
- Ladislav Pejačević, Ban (1880–1883)
- Hermann Ramberg, Ban (1883)
- Karoly Khuen-Héderváry, Ban (1883–1903)

Greece

- Kingdom of Greece

- Monarchs (complete list) –

- Otto, King (1832–1862)
- Regency Council (1863)
- George I, King (1863–1913)

- Prime ministers (complete list) –

- Antonios Kriezis, Prime minister (1849–1854)
- Alexandros Mavrokordatos, Prime minister (1854–1855)
- Dimitrios Voulgaris, Prime minister (1855–1857)
- Athanasios Miaoulis, Prime minister (1857–1862)
- Gennaios Kolokotronis, Prime minister (1862)
- Dimitrios Voulgaris, Prime minister (1862–1863)
- Aristeidis Moraitinis, Prime minister (1863)
- Zinovios Valvis, Prime minister (1863)
- Diomidis Kyriakos, Prime minister (1863)
- Benizelos Roufos, Prime minister (1863)
- Dimitrios Voulgaris, Prime minister (1863–1864)
- Konstantinos Kanaris, Prime minister (1864)
- Zinovios Valvis, Prime minister (1864)
- Konstantinos Kanaris, Prime minister (1864–1865)
- Alexandros Koumoundouros, Prime minister (1865)
- Epameinondas Deligeorgis, Prime minister (1865)
- Benizelos Roufos, Prime minister (1865)
- Dimitrios Voulgaris, Prime minister (1865)
- Alexandros Koumoundouros, Prime minister (1865)
- Epameinondas Deligeorgis, Prime minister (1865)
- Benizelos Roufos, Prime minister (1865–1866)
- Dimitrios Voulgaris, Prime minister (1866)
- Alexandros Koumoundouros, Prime minister (1866–1867)
- Aristeidis Moraitinis, Prime minister (1867–1868)
- Dimitrios Voulgaris, Prime minister (1868–1869)
- Thrasyvoulos Zaimis, Prime minister (1869–1870)
- Epameinondas Deligeorgis, Prime minister (1870)
- Alexandros Koumoundouros, Prime minister (1870–1871)
- Thrasyvoulos Zaimis, Prime minister (1871–1872)
- Dimitrios Voulgaris, Prime minister (1872)
- Epameinondas Deligeorgis, Prime minister (1872–1874)
- Dimitrios Voulgaris, Prime minister (1874–1875)
- Charilaos Trikoupis, Prime minister (1875)
- Alexandros Koumoundouros, Prime minister (1875–1876)
- Epameinondas Deligeorgis, Prime minister (1876)
- Alexandros Koumoundouros, Prime minister (1876–1877)
- Epameinondas Deligeorgis, Prime minister (1877)
- Alexandros Koumoundouros, Prime minister (1877)
- Konstantinos Kanaris, Prime minister (1877)
- Alexandros Koumoundouros, Prime minister (1877–1878)
- Charilaos Trikoupis, Prime minister (1878)
- Alexandros Koumoundouros, Prime minister (1878–1880)
- Charilaos Trikoupis, Prime minister (1880)
- Alexandros Koumoundouros, Prime minister (1880–1882)
- Charilaos Trikoupis, Prime minister (1882–1885)
- Theodoros Deligiannis, Prime minister (1885–1886)
- Dimitrios Valvis, Prime minister (1886)
- Charilaos Trikoupis, Prime minister (1886–1890)
- Theodoros Deligiannis, Prime minister (1890–1892)
- Konstantinos Konstantopoulos, Prime minister (1892)
- Charilaos Trikoupis, Prime minister (1892–1893)
- Sotirios Sotiropoulos, Prime minister (1893)
- Charilaos Trikoupis, Prime minister (1893–1895)
- Nikolaos Deligiannis, Prime minister (1895)
- Theodoros Deligiannis, Prime minister (1895–1897)
- Dimitrios Rallis, Prime minister (1897)
- Alexandros Zaimis, Prime minister (1897–1899)
- Georgios Theotokis, Prime minister (1899–1901)

- Cretan State –

Autonomous state of the Ottoman Empire, establishment by the Great Powers, 1898–1913
- Prince George of Greece, High Commissioner, (1898–1906)

- United States of the Ionian Islands (complete list) –

British protectorate, 1815–1864
For details see the United Kingdom under British Isles, Europe

Kosovo

- Kosovo Vilayet (complete list) –

administrative division of the Ottoman Empire, under Austro-Hungarian occupation 1878–1913
- Ibrahim Edhem Pasha, Governor (1877–1878)
- Hafiz Mehmed Pasha, Governor (1894–1899)
- Reshad Bey Pasha, Governor (1900–1902)

Montenegro

- Prince-Bishopric of Montenegro (complete list) –

- Petar II, Prince-bishop (1830–1851)
- Danilo II, Prince-Bishop (1851–1852), Prince (1852–1860)

- Principality of Montenegro

- Monarchs (complete list) –

- Danilo II, Prince-Bishop (1851–1852), Prince (1852–1860)
- Nikola I, Sovereign prince (1860–1910), King (1910–1918)

- Presidents of the ministerial council (complete list) –

- Božo Petrović-Njegoš, President (1879–1905)

Serbia

- Principality of Serbia

- Monarchs (complete list) –

- Alexander Karađorđević, Prince (1842–1858)
- Miloš Obrenović, Prince (1858–1860)
- Mihailo Obrenović III, Prince (1860–1868)
- Milan IV / I, Prince (1868–1882), King (1882–1889)

- Heads of government (complete list) –

- Avram Petronijević, Prime minister (1844–1852)
- Ilija Garašanin, Prime minister (1852–1853)
- Aleksa Simić, Prime minister (1853–1855)
- Aleksa Janković, Prime minister (1855–1856)
- Stevan Marković, Prime minister (1856)
- Aleksa Simić, Prime minister (1856–1857)
- Stevan Marković, Prime minister (1857–1858)
- Stevan Magazinović, Prime minister (1858–1859)
- Cvetko Rajović, Prime minister (1859–1860)
- Filip Hristić, Prime minister (1860–1861)
- Ilija Garašanin, President of the ministry (1861–1867)
- Jovan Ristić, President of the ministry (1867)
- Nikola Hristić, President of the ministry (1867–1868)
- Đorđe Cenić, President of the ministry (1868–1869)
- Radivoje Milojković, President of the ministry (1869–1872)
- Milivoje Petrović Blaznavac, President of the ministry (1872–1873)
- Jovan Ristić, President of the ministry (1873)
- Jovan Marinović, President of the ministry (1873–1874)
- Aćim Čumić, President of the ministry (1874–1875)
- Danilo Stefanović, President of the ministry (1875)
- Stevča Mihailović, President of the ministry (1875)
- Ljubomir Kaljević, President of the ministry (1875–1876)
- Stevča Mihailović, President of the ministry (1876–1878)
- Jovan Ristić, President of the ministry (1878–1880)
- Milan Piroćanac, President of the ministry (1880–1882)

- Kingdom of Serbia

- Monarchs (complete list) –

- Milan I, Prince (1868–1882), King (1882–1889)
- Alexander, King (1889–1918)

- Presidents of the ministry (complete list) –

- Milan Piroćanac, President of the ministry (1882–1883)
- Nikola Hristić, President of the ministry (1883–1884)
- Milutin Garašanin, President of the ministry (1884–1887)
- Jovan Ristić, President of the ministry (1887–1888)
- Sava Grujić, President of the ministry (1888)
- Nikola Hristić, President of the ministry (1888–1889)
- Kosta Protić, President of the ministry (1889)
- Sava Grujić, President of the ministry (1889–1891)
- Nikola Pašić, President of the ministry (1891–1892)
- Jovan Avakumović, President of the ministry (1892–1893)
- Lazar Dokić, President of the ministry (1893)
- Sava Grujić, President of the ministry (1893–1894)
- Đorđe Simić, President of the ministry (1894)
- Svetomir Nikolajević, President of the ministry (1894)
- Nikola Hristić, President of the ministry (1894–1895)
- Stojan Novaković, President of the ministry (1895–1896)
- Đorđe Simić, President of the ministry (1896–1897)
- Vladan Đorđević, President of the ministry (1897–1900)
- Aleksa Jovanović, President of the ministry (1900–1901)

Slovenia

=== Europe: British Isles ===
- United Kingdom of Great Britain and Ireland

- Monarchs (complete list) –

- Victoria, Queen (1837–1901)

- Prime ministers (complete list) –

- John Russell, Prime minister (1846–1852)
- Edward Smith-Stanley, Prime minister (1852)
- George Hamilton-Gordon, Prime minister (1852–1855)
- Henry John Temple, Prime minister (1855–1858)
- Edward Smith-Stanley, Prime minister (1858–1859)
- Henry John Temple, Prime minister (1859–1865)
- John Russell, Prime minister (1865–1866)
- Edward Smith-Stanley, Prime minister (1866–1868)
- Benjamin Disraeli, Prime minister (1868)
- William Ewart Gladstone, Prime minister (1868–1874)
- Benjamin Disraeli, Prime minister (1874–1880)
- William Ewart Gladstone, Prime minister (1880–1885)
- Robert Gascoyne-Cecil, Prime minister (1885–1886)
- William Ewart Gladstone, Prime minister (1886)
- Robert Gascoyne-Cecil, Prime minister (1886–1892)
- William Ewart Gladstone, Prime minister (1892–1894)
- Archibald Primrose, Prime minister (1894–1895)
- Robert Gascoyne-Cecil, Prime minister (1895–1902)

=== Europe: Central ===
Germany Empire

- German Empire

- Emperor (complete list) –

- William I, Emperor (1861–1888)
- Frederick III, Emperor (1888)
- Wilhelm II, Emperor (1888–1918)

- Chancellors (complete list) –

- Otto von Bismarck, Chancellor (1871–1890)
- Leo von Caprivi, Chancellor (1890–1894)
- Chlodwig zu Hohenlohe-Schillingsfürst, Chancellor (1894–1900)
- Bernhard von Bülow, Chancellor (1900–1909)

- Electorate of Brandenburg, Kingdom of Prussia (complete list, complete list) –

- Frederick William IV, King (1840–1861)
- William I, Emperor (1871–1888), King (1861–1888)
- Frederick III, Emperor (1888), King (1888)
- William II, Emperor (1888–1918), King (1888–1918)

- North German Confederation –

- William I, Bundespräsidium (1867–1871)
- Otto von Bismarck, Chancellor (1867–1871)

Austria-Hungary

- Austria-Hungary: Archduchy/ Austrian Empire/ Kingdom of Hungary

- Archdukes/Emperors/ Kings (complete list, complete list) –

- Franz Joseph I, Emperor and King(1848–1916)

- Heads of government (complete list) –

- Felix of Schwarzenberg, Minister-President (1848–1852)
- Karl Ferdinand von Buol, Chairmen of the ministers' conference (1852–1859)
- Johann Bernhard von Rechberg und Rothenlöwen, Chairmen of the ministers' conference (1859–1861)
- Rainer Ferdinand, Chairmen of the ministers' conference (1861–1865)
- Alexander von Mensdorff-Pouilly, Chairmen of the ministers' conference (1865)
- Richard Belcredi, Chairmen of the ministers' conference (1865–1867)
- Friedrich von Beust, Chairmen of the ministers' conference (1867)

- Habsburg monarchy (complete list) –

Habsburg-Lorraine ruled under numerous simultaneous titles

- Francis Joseph I, (1848–1916)

Bohemia

- Kingdom of Bohemia (complete list) –

- Francis Joseph, King (1848–1916)

Liechtenstein

- Liechtenstein (complete list) –

- Aloys II, Prince (1836–1858)
- Johann II, Prince (1858–1929)

Switzerland

- Switzerland (complete list) –

- Josef Munzinger, President of the Confederation (1851)
- Jonas Furrer, President of the Confederation (1852)
- Wilhelm Matthias Naeff, President of the Confederation (1853)
- Friedrich Frey-Herosé, President of the Confederation (1854)
- Jonas Furrer, President of the Confederation (1855)
- Jakob Stämpfli, President of the Confederation (1856)
- Constant Fornerod, President of the Confederation (1857)
- Jonas Furrer, President of the Confederation (1858)
- Jakob Stämpfli, President of the Confederation (1859)
- Friedrich Frey-Herosé, President of the Confederation (1860)
- Melchior Josef Martin Knüsel, President of the Confederation (1861)
- Jakob Stämpfli, President of the Confederation (1862)
- Constant Fornerod, President of the Confederation (1863)
- Jakob Dubs, President of the Confederation (1864)
- Karl Schenk, President of the Confederation (1865)
- Melchior Josef Martin Knüsel, President of the Confederation (1866)
- Constant Fornerod, President of the Confederation (1867)
- Jakob Dubs, President of the Confederation (1868)
- Emil Welti, President of the Confederation (1869)
- Jakob Dubs, President of the Confederation (1870)
- Karl Schenk, President of the Confederation (1871)
- Emil Welti, President of the Confederation (1872)
- Paul Cérésole, President of the Confederation (1873)
- Karl Schenk, President of the Confederation (1874)
- Johann Jakob Scherer, President of the Confederation (1875)
- Emil Welti, President of the Confederation (1876)
- Joachim Heer, President of the Confederation (1877)
- Karl Schenk, President of the Confederation (1878)
- Bernhard Hammer, President of the Confederation (1879)
- Emil Welti, President of the Confederation (1880)
- Numa Droz, President of the Confederation (1881)
- Simeon Bavier, President of the Confederation (1882)
- Louis Ruchonnet, President of the Confederation (1883)
- Emil Welti, President of the Confederation (1884)
- Karl Schenk, President of the Confederation (1885)
- Adolf Deucher, President of the Confederation (1886)
- Numa Droz, President of the Confederation (1887)
- Wilhelm Hertenstein, President of the Confederation (1888)
- Bernhard Hammer, President of the Confederation (1888–1889)
- Louis Ruchonnet, President of the Confederation (1890)
- Emil Welti, President of the Confederation (1891)
- Walter Hauser, President of the Confederation (1892)
- Karl Schenk, President of the Confederation (1893)
- Emil Frey, President of the Confederation (1894)
- Josef Zemp, President of the Confederation (1895)
- Adrien Lachenal, President of the Confederation (1896)
- Adolf Deucher, President of the Confederation (1897)
- Eugène Ruffy, President of the Confederation (1898)
- Eduard Müller, President of the Confederation (1899)
- Walter Hauser, President of the Confederation (1900)

==== Constituent states of the Confederation of the Rhine and German Confederation ====
These are leaders of constituent states from the German mediatisation in 1806 until the dissolution of the German Confederation in 1866. Leaders of constituent states within the Holy Roman Empire are excluded up to the time of German mediatisation (1801–1806).

- Anhalt-Bernburg (complete list) –

- Alexander Karl, Duke (1834–1863)

re-united to Anhalt

- Anhalt-Dessau (complete list) –

- Leopold III, Prince (1751–1758), Duke (1758–1817), Regent of Anhalt-Köthen (1812–1817)
- Leopold IV, Duke of Anhalt-Dessau (1817–1863), of Anhalt-Köthen (1847–1863), of Anhalt (1863–1871), Regent of Anhalt-Köthen (1817–1818)

- Grand Duchy of Baden (complete list) –

- Leopold, Grand Duke (1830–1852)
- Louis II, Grand Duke (1852–1856)
- Frederick I, Regent (1852–1856), Grand Duke (1856–1907)

- Kingdom of Bavaria (complete list) –

- Maximilian II, King (1848–1864)
- Ludwig II, King (1864–1886)

- Duchy of Brunswick (complete list) –

- William, Duke (1830–1884)

- Free City of Frankfurt (de:complete list) –

- Friedrich Carl Hector Wilhelm Freiherr von Günderrode, Senior Mayor (1851)
- Johann Georg Neuburg, Senior Mayor (1852)
- Carl Heinrich Georg von Heyden, Senior Mayor (1853)
- Johann Georg Neuburg, Senior Mayor (1854)
- Eduard Ludwig von Harnier, Senior Mayor (1855)
- Johann Georg Neuburg, Senior Mayor (1856)
- Eduard Ludwig von Harnier, Senior Mayor (1857)
- Johann Georg Neuburg, Senior Mayor (1858)
- Eduard Ludwig von Harnier, Senior Mayor (1859)
- Samuel Gottlieb Müller, Senior Mayor (1860)
- Friedrich Carl Hector Wilhelm Freiherr von Günderrode, Senior Mayor (1861)
- Johann Georg Neuburg, Senior Mayor (1862)
- Samuel Gottlieb Müller, Senior Mayor (1863)
- Anton Heinrich Emil von Oven, Senior Mayor (1864)
- Philipp Friedrich Gwinner, Senior Mayor (1865)
- Karl Konstanz Viktor Fellner, Senior Mayor (1866)

- Kingdom of Hanover (complete list) –

- Ernest Augustus, King (1837–1851)
- George V, King (1851–1866)

- Grand Duchy of Hesse and by Rhine (complete list) –

- Louis III, Grand Duke (1848–1877)

- Hesse-Homburg (complete list) –

- Ferdinand, Landgrave (1848–1866)

- Electorate of Hesse (complete list) –

- Frederick William, Elector (1847–1866)

- Hesse-Philippsthal (complete list) –

- Charles II, Landgrave (1849–1866)

- Hesse-Philippsthal-Barchfeld (complete list) –

- Charles, Landgrave (1803–1854)
- Alexis, Landgrave (1854–1866)

- Duchy of Holstein

- Dukes (complete list) –

- Frederik VII, Duke (1848–1863)
- Christian IX, Duke (1863–1864)

- Statholders (complete list) –

- Frederick of Schleswig-Holstein-Sonderburg-Augustenburg, Statholder (1842–1851)

- Isenburg-Büdingen-Birstein (complete list) –

- Wolfgang Ernest III, Prince (1820–1866)

- Principality of Lippe (complete list) –

- Leopold II, Prince (1802–1851)
- Leopold III, Prince (1851–1875)

- Duchy of Limburg (1839–1867) (complete list) –

- William III, Duke (1849–1866)

- Free City of Lübeck (complete list) –

- Johann Joachim Friedrich Torkuhl, Mayor (1851–1852)
- Johann Hermann Eschenburg, Mayor (1851–1852)
- Bernhard Heinrich Frister, Mayor (1853–1854)
- Karl Ludwig Roeck, Mayor (1855–1856)
- Johann Hermann Eschenburg, Mayor (1857–1858)
- Johann Joachim Friedrich Torkuhl, Mayor (1857–1858)
- Karl Ludwig Roeck, Mayor (1859–1860)
- Heinrich Brehmer, Mayor (1861–1862)
- Karl Ludwig Roeck, Mayor (1863–1864)
- Heinrich Brehmer, Mayor (1865–1866)

- Duchy/ Grand Duchy of Mecklenburg-Schwerin (complete list) –

- Frederick Francis II, Grand Duke (1842–1883)

- Duchy/ Grand Duchy of Mecklenburg-Strelitz (complete list) –

- George I, Grand Duke (1816–1860)
- Frederick William II, Grand Duke (1860–1904)

- Duchy of Nassau (complete list) –

- Adolphe, Duke (1839–1866)

- Grand Duchy of Oldenburg (complete list) –

- Augustus I, Grand Duke (1829–1853)
- Peter II, Grand Duke (1853–1900)

- Reuss-Gera (complete list) –

- Heinrich LXII, Prince (1818–1854)
- Heinrich LXVII, Prince (1854–1867)

- Reuss-Greiz (complete list) –

- Heinrich XX, Prince (1836–1859)
- Heinrich XXII, Prince (1859–1902)

- Salm-Horstmar (complete list) –

- Wilhelm Friedrich, Prince (1816–1865)
- Otto I, Prince (1865–1892)

- Saxe-Coburg and Gotha (complete list) –

- Ernest II, Duke (1844–1893)

- Saxe-Altenburg, Saxe-Hildburghausen (complete list) –

- Georg, Duke (1848–1853)
- Ernst I, Duke (1853–1908)

- Saxe-Meiningen (complete list) –

- Bernhard II, Duke (1803–1866)

- Saxe-Weimar-Eisenach (complete list) –

- Charles Frederick, Grand Duke (1828–1853)
- Charles Alexander, Grand Duke (1853–1901)

- Kingdom of Saxony (complete list) –

- Frederick Augustus II, King (1836–1854)
- John, King (1854–1873)

- Schwarzburg-Rudolstadt (complete list) –

- Frederick Günther, Prince (1807–1867)

- Schwarzburg-Sondershausen (complete list) –

- Günther Friedrich Carl II, Prince (1835–1880)

- Principality of Waldeck and Pyrmont (complete list) –

- George Victor, Prince (1845–1893)

- Kingdom of Württemberg (complete list) –

- Frederick I, Duke (1797–1803), Elector (1803–1805), King (1805–1816)
- William I, King (1816–1864)
- Charles I, King (1864–1891)

- Ysenburg and Büdingen (complete list) –

- Ernest Casimir II, Prince (1848–1861)
- Bruno, Prince (1861–1906)

=== Europe: East ===
Romania

- Moldavia (complete list) –

- Grigore Alexandru Ghica, Prince (1849–1853, 1854–1856)
- Russian occupation (1853–1854)
- Protectorate established by the Treaty of Paris (1856–1859)
- Extraordinary Administrative Council–1856)
- Teodor Balș, Kaymakam (1856–1857)
- Nicolae Vogoride, Kaymakam (1857–1858)
- Kaymakams (1858–1859)
- Alexander John Cuza, Prince (1859–1862)

- Principality of Wallachia (complete list) –

- Provisional Government (1848)
- Locotenența domnească, Regency of three (1848)
- Omar Pasha and Alexander von Lüders, military commanders (1848–1851)
- Constantin Cantacuzino, Kaymakam (1848)
- Barbu Știrbei, Prince (1848–1853, 854–1856)
- Russian occupation (1853–1854)
- Ottoman occupation (1854)
- Johann Coronini-Cronberg, military commander (1854–1856)
- Protectorate established by the Treaty of Paris (1856–1859)
- Alexandru II Ghica, Kaymakam (1856–1858)
- Ioan Manu, Emanoil Băleanu, Ioan A. Filipescu, Caimacam of three (1858–1859)
- Alexander John Cuza, Prince (1859–1862)

- United Principalities of Moldavia and Wallachia/ Romanian United Principalities/ Romania

- Domnitors (complete list) –

- Alexander John Cuza, Domnitor (1862–1866)
- Lascăr Catargiu, Nicolae Golescu, Nicolae Haralambie, Princely Lieutenancy (1866)
- Carol I, Domnitor (1866–1881)

- Prime ministers (complete list) –

- Barbu Catargiu, Prime minister (1862)
- Apostol Arsache, acting Prime minister (1862)
- Nicolae Kretzulescu, Prime minister (1862–1863, 1865–1866)
- Mihail Kogălniceanu, Prime minister (1863–1865)
- Constantin Bosianu, Prime minister (1865)
- Ion Ghica, Prime minister (1866, 1866–1867, 1870–1871)
- Lascăr Catargiu, Prime minister (1866, 1871–1876, 1889, 1891–1895)
- Constantin A. Kretzulescu, Prime minister (1867)
- Ștefan Golescu, Prime minister (1867–1868)
- Nicolae Golescu, Prime minister (1868)
- Dimitrie Ghica, Prime minister (1868–1870)
- Alexandru G. Golescu, Prime minister (1870)
- Manolache Costache Epureanu, Prime minister (1870, 1876)
- Ioan Emanoil Florescu, Prime minister (1876, 1891)
- Ion C. Brătianu, Prime minister (1876–1881, 1881–1888)

- Kingdom of Romania

- Kings (complete list) –

- Charles I, King (1881–1914)

- Prime ministers (complete list) –

- Ion C. Brătianu, Prime minister (1881, 1881–1888)
- Dimitrie Brătianu, Prime minister (1881)
- Theodor Rosetti, Prime minister (1881–1888)
- Lascăr Catargiu, Prime minister (1866, 1871–1876, 1889, 1891–1895)
- Ioan Emanoil Florescu, Prime minister (1876, 1891)
- Dimitrie Sturdza, Prime minister (1895–1896, 1897–1899)
- Petre S. Aurelian, Prime minister (1896–1897)
- Gheorghe Grigore Cantacuzino, Prime minister (1899–1900)
- Petre P. Carp, Prime minister (1900–1901)

Russia

- Russian Empire

- Monarchs (complete list) –

- Nicholas I, Emperor (1825–1855)
- Alexander II, Emperor (1855–1881)
- Alexander III, Emperor (1881–1894)
- Nicholas II, Emperor (1894–1917)

- Heads of government (complete list) –

- Alexander Chernyshyov, Chairman of the committee of ministers (1848–1856)
- Alexey Fyodorovich Orlov, Chairman of the committee of ministers (1856–1861)
- Dmitry Bludov, Chairman of the committee of ministers (1861–1864)
- Pavel Gagarin, Chairman of the committee of ministers (1865–1872)
- Nikolay Pavlovich Ignatyev, Chairman of the committee of ministers (1872–1879)
- Pyotr Valuyev, Chairman of the committee of ministers (1879–1881)
- Mikhail Reitern, Chairman of the committee of ministers (1881–1887)
- Nikolai Bunge, Chairman of the committee of ministers (1887–1895)
- Ivan Durnovo, Chairman of the committee of ministers (1895–1903)

- Caucasian Imamate –

- Shamil, Imam (1834–1859)

Ukraine

- Kingdom of Galicia and Lodomeria (complete list) –

1804–1918, crownland of the Austrian Empire

- Francis Joseph I, King (1848–1916)

=== Europe: Nordic ===
Denmark

- Denmark

- Monarchs (complete list) –

- Frederik VII, King (1848–1863)
- Christian IX, King (1863–1906)

- Prime ministers (complete list) –

- Adam Wilhelm Moltke, Prime minister (1848–1852)
- Christian Albrecht Bluhme, Prime minister (1852–1853)
- Anders Sandøe Ørsted, Prime minister (1853–1854)
- Peter Georg Bang, Prime minister (1854–1855), Council president (1855–1856)
- Carl Christoffer Georg Andræ, Council president (1856–1857)
- Carl Christian Hall, Council president (1857–1859)
- Carl Edvard Rotwitt, Council president (1859–1860)
- Carl Christian Hall, Council president (1860–1863)
- Ditlev Gothard Monrad, Council president (1863–1864)
- Christian Albrecht Bluhme, Council president (1864–1865)
- Christian Emil Krag-Juel-Vind-Frijs, Council president (1865–1870)
- Ludvig Holstein-Holsteinborg, Council president (1870–1874)
- Christen Andreas Fonnesbech, Council president (1874–1875)
- Jacob Brønnum Scavenius Estrup, Council president (1875–1894)
- Tage Reedtz-Thott, Council president (1894–1897)
- Hugo Egmont Hørring, Council president (1897–1900)
- Hannibal Sehested, Council president (1900–1901)

- Duchy of Schleswig (complete list) –

- Frederik VII, Duke (1848–1863)
- Christian IX, Duke (1863–1864)

Finland

- Grand Duchy of Finland (complete list) –

- Nicholas I, Grand Prince (1825–1855)
- Alexander II, Grand Prince (1855–1881)
- Alexander III, Grand Prince (1881–1894)
- Nicholas II, Grand Prince (1894–1917)

Sweden–Norway

- Sweden–Norway

- Monarchs (complete list, complete list) –

- Oscar I, King (1844–1859)
- Charles XV/IV, King (1859–1872)
- Oscar II, King (1872–1905)

- Prime ministers: Sweden (complete list) –

- Louis Gerhard De Geer, Prime minister (1876–1880)
- Arvid Posse, Prime minister (1880–1883)
- Carl Johan Thyselius, Prime minister (1883–1884)
- Robert Themptander, Prime minister (1884–1888)
- Gillis Bildt, Prime minister (1888–1889)
- Gustaf Åkerhielm, Prime minister (1889–1891)
- Erik Gustaf Boström, Prime minister (1891–1900)
- Fredrik von Otter, Prime minister (1900–1902)

- Norwegian prime ministers in Stockholm (complete list) –

- Otto Richard Kierulf, Prime minister (1873–1884)
- Wolfgang Wenzel von Haffner, Acting Prime minister (1884)
- Carl Otto Løvenskiold, Prime minister (1884)
- Ole Richter, Prime minister (1884–1888)
- Hans Georg Jacob Stang, Prime minister (1888–1889)
- Gregers Gram, Prime minister (1889–1891)
- Otto Blehr, Prime minister (1891–1893)
- Gregers Gram, Prime minister (1893–1898)
- Otto Blehr, Prime minister (1898–1902)

- Heads of government in Norway (complete list) –

First ministers in Christiania, Norway
- Nicolai Johan Lohmann Krog, First Minister (1836–1855)
- Jørgen Herman Vogt, First Minister (1855–1858)
- Hans Christian Petersen, First Minister (1858–1861)
- Frederik Stang, First Minister (1861–1873)
Prime ministers in Christiania, Norway
- Frederik Stang, Prime minister (1873–1880)
- Christian August Selmer, Prime minister (1880–1884)
- Christian Homann Schweigaard, Prime minister (1884)
- Johan Sverdrup, Prime minister (1884–1889)
- Emil Stang, Prime minister (1889–1891)
- Johannes Steen, Prime minister (1891–1893)
- Emil Stang, Prime minister (1893–1895)
- Francis Hagerup, Prime minister (1895–1898)
- Johannes Steen, Prime minister (1898–1902)

=== Europe: Southcentral ===
Italy

- Kingdom of Italy

- Monarchs (complete list) –

- Victor Emmanuel II, King (1861–1878)
- Umberto I, King (1878–1900)
- Victor Emmanuel III, King (1900–1946)

- Prime ministers (complete list) –

- Camillo Benso, Prime minister (1861)
- Bettino Ricasoli, Prime minister (1861–1862)
- Urbano Rattazzi, Prime minister (1862)
- Luigi Carlo Farini, Prime minister (1862–1863)
- Marco Minghetti, Prime minister (1863–1864)
- Alfonso Ferrero La Marmora, Prime minister (1864–1866)
- Bettino Ricasoli, Prime minister (1866–1867)
- Urbano Rattazzi, Prime minister (1867)
- Luigi Federico Menabrea, Prime minister (1867–1869)
- Giovanni Lanza, Prime minister (1869–1873)
- Marco Minghetti, Prime minister (1873–1876)
- Agostino Depretis, Prime minister (1876–1878)
- Benedetto Cairoli, Prime minister (1878)
- Agostino Depretis, Prime minister (1878–1879)
- Benedetto Cairoli, Prime minister (1879–1881)
- Agostino Depretis, Prime minister (1881–1887)
- Francesco Crispi, Prime minister (1887–1891)
- Antonio Starabba, Prime minister (1891–1892)
- Giovanni Giolitti, Prime minister (1892–1893)
- Francesco Crispi, Prime minister (1893–1896)
- Antonio Starabba, Prime minister (1896–1898)
- Luigi Pelloux, Prime minister (1898–1900)
- Giuseppe Saracco, Prime minister (1900–1901)

- Kingdom of Lombardy–Venetia (complete list) –

- Francis Joseph I, King (1848–1866)

- Duchy of Modena (complete list) –

- Francesco V, Duke (1846–1859)

- Duchy of Parma (complete list) –

- Charles III, Duke (1849–1854)
- Robert I, Duke (1854–1859)

- Kingdom of Sardinia, Duchy of Savoy (complete list, complete list) –

- Victor Emmanuel II, King of Sardinia, Duke of Savoy (1849–1861)

- Kingdom of the Two Sicilies (complete list) –

- Ferdinand II, King (1830–1859)
- Francis II, King (1859–1861)

- Grand Duchy of Tuscany (complete list) –

- Leopoldo II, Grand Duke (1824–1849, 1849–1859)
- Ferdinando IV, Grand Duke (1859)

Malta

- Crown Colony of Malta (complete list) –

British colony, 1813–1964
For details see the United Kingdom under British Isles, Europe

San Marino

- San Marino

- Captains Regent (1700–1900) –

- Giambattista Bonelli, Marino Berti, Captains Regent (1850–1851)
- Francesco Guidi Giangi, Marco Suzzi Valli, Captains Regent (1851)
- Domenic' Antonio Bartolotti, Antonio Para, Captains Regent (1851–1852)
- Melchiorre Filippi, Pietro Righi, Captains Regent (1852)
- Filippo Belluzzi, Gaetano Simoncini, Captains Regent (1852–1853)
- Domenico Maria Belzoppi, Pier Matteo Berti, Captains Regent (1853)
- Giambattista Braschi, Francesco Valli, Captains Regent (1853–1854)
- Girolamo Gozi, Pietro Ugolini, Captains Regent (1854)
- Francesco Guidi Giangi, Pietro Barbieri, Captains Regent (1854–1855)
- Gaetano Belluzzi (represented by Filippo Belluzzi), Francesco Rossini, Captains Regent (1855)
- Giovanni Benedetto Belluzzi, Marino Masi, Captains Regent (1855–1856)
- Giuseppe Filippi, Pietro Righi, Captains Regent (1856)
- Melchiorre Filippi, Gaetano Simoncini, Captains Regent (1856–1857)
- Innocenzo Bonelli, Domenico Fattori, Captains Regent (1857)
- Settimio Belluzzi, Giacomo Berti, Captains Regent (1857–1858)
- Francesco Guidi Giangi, Marino Malpeli, Captains Regent (1858)
- Filippo Belluzzi, Pasquale Marcucci, Captains Regent (1858–1859)
- Giuliano Belluzzi, Michele Ceccoli, Captains Regent (1859)
- Palamede Malpeli, Pier Matteo Berti, Captains Regent (1859–1860)
- Giuseppe Filippi, Pietro Righi, Captains Regent (1860)
- Gaetano Belluzzi, Costanzo Damiani, Captains Regent (1860–1861)
- Settimio Belluzzi, Giacomo Berti, Captains Regent (1861)
- Melchiorre Filippi, Domenico Fattori, Captains Regent (1861–1862)
- Innocenzo Bonelli, Gaetano Simoncini, Captains Regent (1862)
- Francesco Guidi Giangi, Pietro Tonnini, Captains Regent (1862–1863)
- Giuliano Belluzzi, Michele Ceccoli, Captains Regent (1863)
- Giuseppe Filippi, Francesco Casali, Captains Regent (1863–1864)
- Gaetano Belluzzi, Pietro Righi, Captains Regent (1864)
- Palamede Malpeli, Pasquale Marcucci, Captains Regent (1864–1865)
- Settimio Belluzzi, Giacomo Berti, Captains Regent (1865)
- Filippo Belluzzi, Silvestro Masi, Captains Regent (1865–1866)
- Innocenzo Bonelli, Michele Vita, Captains Regent (1866)
- Melchiorre Filippi, Domenico Fattori, Captains Regent (1866–1867)
- Giuliano Belluzzi, Michele Ceccoli, Captains Regent (1867)
- Gaetano Simoncini, Pietro Righi, Captains Regent (1867–1868)
- Palamede Malpeli, Giuseppe Vagnini, Captains Regent (1868)
- Pietro Tonnini, Sante Lonfernini, Captains Regent (1868–1869)
- Filippo Belluzzi, Francesco Malpeli, Captains Regent (1869)
- Settimio Belluzzi, Giacomo Berti, Captains Regent (1869–1870)
- Innocenzo Bonelli, Ortollero Grazia, Captains Regent (1870)
- Melchiorre Filippi, Domenico Fattori, Captains Regent (1870–1871)
- Gaetano Simoncini, Pietro Ugolini, Captains Regent (1871)
- Palamede Malpeli, Luigi Pasquali, Captains Regent (1871–1872)
- Giuliano Belluzzi, Pietro Berti, Captains Regent (1872)
- Federico Gozi, Francesco Malpeli, Captains Regent (1872–1873)
- Settimio Belluzzi, Francesco Marcucci, Captains Regent (1873)
- Giuseppe Filippi, Marino Fattori, Captains Regent (1873–1874)
- Filippo Belluzzi, Marino Babboni, Captains Regent (1874)
- Gaetano Simoncini, Domenico Fattori, Captains Regent (1874–1875)
- Palamede Malpeli, Luigi Pasquali, Captains Regent (1875)
- Pietro Tonnini, Giuseppe Giacomini, Captains Regent (1875–1876)
- Gaetano Belluzzi, Sante Lonfernini, Captains Regent (1876)
- Settimio Belluzzi, Michele Ceccoli, Captains Regent (1876–1877)
- Innocenzo Bonelli, Andrea Barbieri, Captains Regent (1877)
- Giuliano Belluzzi, Pietro Ugolini, Captains Regent (1877–1878)
- Domenico Fattori, Marino Babboni, Captains Regent (1878)
- Camillo Bonelli, Pietro Berti, Captains Regent (1878–1879)
- Gaetano Simoncini, Marino Nicolini, Captains Regent (1879)
- Federico Gozi, Francesco Malpeli, Captains Regent (1879–1880)
- Luigi Pasquali, Giuseppe Giacomini, Captains Regent (1880)
- Settimio Belluzzi, Pasquale Busignani, Captains Regent (1880–1881)
- Antonio Belluzzi, Marino Martelli, Captains Regent (1881)
- Domenico Fattori, Teodoro Ceccoli, Captains Regent (1881–1882)
- Marino Fattori, Francesco Marcucci, Captains Regent (1882)
- Giuliano Belluzzi, Michele Ceccoli, Captains Regent (1882–1883)
- Pietro Tonnini, Sante Lonfernini, Captains Regent (1883)
- Pietro Filippi, Pietro Berti, Captains Regent (1883–1884)
- Settimio Belluzzi, Francesco Malpeli, Captains Regent (1884)
- Federico Gozi, Antonio Righi, Captains Regent (1884–1885)
- Luigi Pasquali, Pasquale Busignani, Captains Regent (1885)
- Antonio Michetti, Marino Nicolini, Captains Regent (1885–1886)
- Domenico Fattori, Teodoro Ceccoli, Captains Regent (1886)
- Gaetano Simoncini, Pietro Ugolini, Captains Regent (1886–1887)
- Marino Fattori, Settimio Lonfernini, Captains Regent (1887)
- Pietro Filippi, Federico Martelli, Captains Regent (1887–1888)
- Settimio Belluzzi, Marino Marcucci, Captains Regent (1888)
- Federico Gozi, Antonio Righi, Captains Regent (1888–1889)
- Menetto Bonelli, Marino Babboni, Captains Regent (1889)
- Domenico Fattori, Marino Nicolini, Captains Regent (1889–1890)
- Pietro Tonnini, Francesco Marcucci, Captains Regent (1890)
- Giuliano Belluzzi, Pietro Ugolini, Captains Regent (1890–1891)
- Pietro Filippi, Federico Martelli, Captains Regent (1891)
- Antonio Michetti, Pasquale Busignani, Captains Regent (1891–1892)
- Federico Gozi, Silvestro Vita, Captains Regent (1892)
- Gemino Gozi, Giacomo Marcucci, Captains Regent (1892–1893)
- Menetto Bonelli, Marino Babboni, Captains Regent (1893)
- Marino Fattori, Pietro Francini, Captains Regent (1893–1894)
- Pietro Tonnini/ Giuliano Belluzzi, Francesco Marcucci, Captains Regent (1894)
- Settimio Belluzzi, Marino Borbiconi, Captains Regent (1894–1895)
- Domenico Fattori, Antonio Righi, Captains Regent (1895)
- Federico Gozi, Vincenzo Mularoni, Captains Regent (1895–1896)
- Giovanni Bonelli, Settimio Lonfernini, Captains Regent (1896)
- Menetto Bonelli, Marino Babboni, Captains Regent (1896–1897)
- Luigi Tonnini, Teodoro Ceccoli, Captains Regent (1897)
- Antonio Belluzzi, Pasquale Busignani, Captains Regent (1897–1898)
- Pietro Filippi, Onofrio Fattori, Captains Regent (1898)
- Marino Borbiconi, Francesco Marcucci, Captains Regent (1898–1899)
- Gemino Gozi, Giacomo Marcucci, Captains Regent (1899)
- Federico Gozi, Silvestro Vita, Captains Regent (1899–1900)
- Domenico Fattori, Antonio Righi, Captains Regent (1900)
- Giovanni Bonelli, Pietro Ugolini, Captains Regent (1900–1901)

Vatican City

- Papal States (complete list) –

- Pius IX, Pope (1846–1878)
- Leo XIII, Pope (1878–1903)

=== Europe: Southwest ===
Andorra

- Andorra

- Episcopal Co-Princes (complete list) –

- Simó de Guardiola i Hortoneda, Episcopal Co-Prince (1827–1851)
- Josep Caixal i Estradé, Episcopal Co-Prince (1853–1879)
- Salvador Casañas y Pagés, Episcopal Co-Prince (1879–1901)

- French Co-Princes (complete list) –

- Napoléon III, French Co-Prince (1848–1870)
- Adolphe Thiers, French Co-Prince (1871–1873)
- Patrice de Mac-Mahon, French Co-Prince (1873–1879)
- Jules Armand Dufaure, Acting French Co-Prince (1879)
- Jules Grévy, French Co-Prince (1879–1887)
- Maurice Rouvier, Acting French Co-Prince (1887)
- Marie François Sadi Carnot, French Co-Prince (1887–1894)
- Charles Dupuy, Acting French Co-Prince (1894)
- Jean Casimir-Perier, French Co-Prince (1894–1895)
- Charles Dupuy, Acting French Co-Prince (1895)
- Félix Faure, French Co-Prince (1895–1899)
- Charles Dupuy, Acting French Co-Prince (1899)
- Émile Loubet, French Co-Prince (1899–1906)

Portugal

- Kingdom of Portugal

- Monarchs (complete list) –

- Maria II, Queen (1826–1828, 1834–1853)
- Ferdinand II, King (1837–1853)
- Pedro V, King (1853–1861)
- Luís I, King (1861–1889)
- Carlos I, King (1889–1908)

- Prime ministers (complete list) –

- António Bernardo da Costa Cabral, Prime minister (1849–1851)
- António Severim de Noronha, Prime minister (1851)
- João Carlos Saldanha de Oliveira e Daun, Prime minister (1851–1856)
- Nuno José de Moura Barreto, Prime minister (1856–1859)
- António Severim de Noronha, Prime minister (1859–1860)
- Joaquim António de Aguiar, Prime minister (1860)
- Nuno José de Moura Barreto, Prime minister (1860–1865)
- Bernardo de Sá Nogueira de Figueiredo, Prime minister (1865)
- Joaquim António de Aguiar, Prime minister (1865–1868)
- António José de Ávila, Prime minister (1868)
- Bernardo de Sá Nogueira de Figueiredo, Prime minister (1868–1869)
- Nuno José de Moura Barreto, Prime minister (1869–1870)
- João Carlos Saldanha de Oliveira Daun, Prime minister (1870)
- Bernardo de Sá Nogueira de Figueiredo, Prime minister (1870)
- António José de Ávila, Prime minister (1870–1871)
- Fontes Pereira de Melo, Prime minister (1871–1877)
- António José de Ávila, Prime minister (1877–1878)
- Fontes Pereira de Melo, Prime minister (1878–1879)
- Anselmo José Braamcamp, Prime minister (1879–1881)
- António Rodrigues Sampaio, Prime minister (1881)
- Fontes Pereira de Melo, Prime minister (1881–1886)
- José Luciano de Castro, Prime minister (1886–1890)
- António de Serpa Pimentel, Prime minister (1890)
- João Crisóstomo, Prime minister (1890–1892)
- José Dias Ferreira, Prime minister (1892–1893)
- Ernesto Hintze Ribeiro, Prime minister (1893–1897)
- José Luciano de Castro, Prime minister (1897–1900)
- Ernesto Hintze Ribeiro, Prime minister (1900–1904)

Spain

- Kingdom of Spain (1810–1873) (complete list) –

- Isabella II, Queen (1833–1868)
- Amadeo I, King (1870–1873)

- First Spanish Republic

- Presidents (complete list) –

- Estanislao Figueras, President (1873)
- Francisco Pi y Margall, President (1873)
- Nicolás Salmerón y Alonso, President (1873)
- Emilio Castelar y Ripoll, President (1873–1874)
- Francisco Serrano y Domínguez, President (1874)

- Prime ministers (complete list) –

- Juan de Zavala, Prime minister (1874)
- Práxedes Mateo Sagasta, Prime minister (1874)

- Bourbon Restoration of Spain

- Monarchs (complete list) –

- Alfonso XII, King (1874–1885)
- Alfonso XIII, King (1886–1931)

- Prime ministers (complete list) –

- Antonio Cánovas del Castillo, Prime minister (1874–1875)
- Joaquín Jovellar y Soler, Prime minister (1875)
- Antonio Cánovas del Castillo, Prime minister (1875–1879)
- Arsenio Martínez-Campos y Antón, Prime minister (1879)
- Antonio Cánovas del Castillo, Prime minister (1879–1881)
- Práxedes Mateo Sagasta, Prime minister (1881–1883)
- José Posada Herrera, Prime minister (1883–1884)
- Antonio Cánovas del Castillo, Prime minister (1884–1885)
- Práxedes Mateo Sagasta, Prime minister (1885–1890)
- Antonio Cánovas del Castillo, Prime minister (1890–1892)
- Práxedes Mateo Sagasta, Prime minister (1892–1895)
- Antonio Cánovas del Castillo, Prime minister (1895–1897)
- Marcelo Azcárraga Palmero, Prime minister (1897)
- Práxedes Mateo Sagasta, Prime minister (1897–1899)
- Francisco Silvela, Prime minister (1899–1900)
- Marcelo Azcárraga Palmero, Prime minister (1900–1901)

=== Europe: West ===
Belgium

- Belgium

- Monarchs (complete list) –

- Leopold I, King (1831–1865)
- Leopold II, King (1865–1909)

- Prime ministers (complete list) –

- Charles Rogier, Prime minister (1847–1852)
- Henri de Brouckère, Prime minister (1852–1855)
- Pierre de Decker, Prime minister (1855–1857)
- Charles Rogier, Prime minister (1857–1868)
- Walthère Frère-Orban, Prime minister (1868–1870)
- Jules d'Anethan, Prime minister (1870–1871)
- Barthélémy de Theux de Meylandt, Prime minister (1871–1874)
- Jules Malou, Prime minister (1874–1878)
- Walthère Frère-Orban, Prime minister (1878–1884)
- Jules Malou, Prime minister (1884)
- Auguste Beernaert, Prime minister (1884–1894)
- Jules de Burlet, Prime minister (1894–1896)
- Paul de Smet de Naeyer, Prime minister (1896–1899)
- Jules Vandenpeereboom, Prime minister (1899)
- Paul de Smet de Naeyer, Prime minister (1899–1907)

France

- French Second Republic

- Presidents (complete list) –

- Louis-Napoléon Bonaparte, President (1848–1852)

- Prime ministers (complete list) –

- Alphonse Henri, comte d'Hautpoul, Prime minister (1849–1851)
- Léon Faucher, Prime minister (1851)

- Second French Empire

- Emperors (complete list) –

- Napoleon III, Emperor (1852–1870)

- Cabinet Chiefs (complete list) –

- Émile Ollivier, Cabinet chief (1869–1870)
- Charles Cousin-Montauban, Cabinet chief (1870)

- French Third Republic

- Presidents (complete list) –

- Louis Jules Trochu, Interim Head of state (1870–1871)
- Adolphe Thiers, President (1871–1873)
- Patrice de Mac-Mahon, President (1873–1879)
- Jules Armand Dufaure, Acting President (1879)
- Jules Grévy, President (1879–1887)
- Maurice Rouvier, Acting President (1887)
- Marie François Sadi Carnot, President (1887–1894)
- Charles Dupuy, Acting President (1894)
- Jean Casimir-Perier, President (1894–1895)
- Charles Dupuy, Acting President (1895)
- Félix Faure, President (1895–1899)
- Charles Dupuy, Acting President (1899)
- Émile Loubet, President (1899–1906)

- President of the Council of ministers (complete list) –

- Louis-Jules Trochu, President of the Council of ministers (1870–1871)
- Jules Armand Dufaure, President of the Council of ministers (1871–1873)
- Albert, duc de Broglie, President of the Council of ministers (1873–1874)
- Ernest Courtot de Cissey, President of the Council of ministers (1874–1875)
- Louis Buffet, President of the Council of ministers (1875–1876)
- Jules Armand Dufaure, President of the Council of ministers (1876)
- Jules Simon, President of the Council of ministers (1876–1877)
- Albert, duc de Broglie, President of the Council of ministers (1877)
- Gaëtan de Rochebouët, President of the Council of ministers (1877)
- Jules Armand Dufaure, President of the Council of ministers (1877–1879)
- William Waddington, President of the Council of ministers (1879)
- Charles de Freycinet, President of the Council of ministers (1879–1880)
- Jules Ferry, President of the Council of ministers (1880–1881)
- Léon Gambetta, President of the Council of ministers (1881–1882)
- Charles de Freycinet, President of the Council of ministers (1882)
- Charles Duclerc, President of the Council of ministers (1882–1883)
- Armand Fallières, President of the Council of ministers (1883)
- Jules Ferry, President of the Council of ministers (1883–1885)
- Henri Brisson, President of the Council of ministers (1885–1886)
- Charles de Freycinet, President of the Council of ministers (1886)
- René Goblet, President of the Council of ministers (1886–1887)
- Maurice Rouvier, President of the Council of ministers (1887)
- Pierre Tirard, President of the Council of ministers (1887–1888)
- Charles Floquet, President of the Council of ministers (1888–1889)
- Pierre Tirard, President of the Council of ministers (1889–1890)
- Charles de Freycinet, President of the Council of ministers (1890–1892)
- Émile Loubet, President of the Council of ministers (1892)
- Alexandre Ribot, President of the Council of ministers (1892–1893)
- Charles Dupuy, President of the Council of ministers (1893)
- Jean Casimir-Perier, President of the Council of ministers (1893–1894)
- Charles Dupuy, President of the Council of ministers (1894–1895)
- Alexandre Ribot, President of the Council of ministers (1895)
- Léon Bourgeois, President of the Council of ministers (1895–1896)
- Jules Méline, President of the Council of ministers (1896–1898)
- Henri Brisson, President of the Council of ministers (1898)
- Charles Dupuy, President of the Council of ministers (1898–1899)
- Pierre Waldeck-Rousseau, President of the Council of ministers (1899–1902)

Luxembourg

- Luxembourg

- Monarchs (complete list) –

- William III, Grand Duke (1849–1890)
- Adolphe, Grand Duke (1890–1905)

- Prime ministers (complete list) –

- Jean-Jacques Willmar, Prime minister (1848–1853)
- Charles-Mathias Simons, Prime minister (1853–1860)
- Victor de Tornaco, Prime minister (1860–1867)
- Emmanuel Servais, Prime minister (1867–1874)
- Félix de Blochausen, Prime minister (1874–1885)
- Édouard Thilges, Prime minister (1885–1888)
- Paul Eyschen, Prime minister (1888–1915)

Monaco

- Monaco (complete list) –

- Florestan I, Prince (1841–1856)
- Charles III, Prince (1856–1889)
- Albert I, Prince (1889–1922)

Netherlands

- Kingdom of the Netherlands

- Monarchs (complete list) –

- William III, King (1849–1890)
- Wilhelmina, Queen (1890–1948)

- Prime ministers (complete list) –

- Johan Rudolph Thorbecke, Prime minister (1849–1853)
- Floris Adriaan van Hall, Prime minister (1853–1856)
- Justinus van der Brugghen, Prime minister (1856–1858)
- Jan Jacob Rochussen, Prime minister (1858–1860)
- Floris Adriaan van Hall, Prime minister (1860–1861)
- Jacob van Zuylen van Nijevelt, Prime minister (1861)
- Schelto van Heemstra, Prime minister (1861–1862)
- Johan Rudolph Thorbecke, Prime minister (1862–1866)
- Isaäc Dignus Fransen van de Putte, Prime minister (1866)
- Julius van Zuylen van Nijevelt, Prime minister (1866–1868)
- Pieter Philip van Bosse, Prime minister (1868–1871)
- Johan Rudolph Thorbecke, Prime minister (1871–1872)
- Gerrit de Vries, Prime minister (1872–1874)
- Jan Heemskerk, Prime minister (1874–1877)
- Jan Kappeyne van de Coppello, Prime minister (1877–1879)
- Theo van Lynden van Sandenburg, Prime minister (1879–1883)
- Jan Heemskerk, Prime minister (1883–1888)
- Æneas Mackay, Prime minister (1888–1891)
- Gijsbert van Tienhoven, Prime minister (1891–1894)
- Joan Röell, Prime minister (1894–1897)
- Nicolaas Pierson, Prime minister (1897–1901)

=== Eurasia: Caucasus ===
Azerbaijan

Georgia

- Principality of Abkhazia (complete list) –

- Mikhail, Prince (1822–1864)

Russia: Dagestan

- Gazikumukh Khanate (complete list) –

- Aglar ibn Umar, Khan (1847–1859)
- Jafar ibn Aglar, Khan (1877–1877)

== Oceania ==
=== Australia and Papua New Guinea ===
Australia

- Colony of New South Wales (complete list) –

British colony, 1788–1900
For details see the United Kingdom under British Isles, Europe

Papua New Guinea

- German New Guinea (complete list) –

German colony, 1884–1919
For details see the German Empire under central Europe

- Territory of Papua (complete list) –

British protectorate, 1884–1888
British colony, 1888–1902
For details see the United Kingdom under the British Isles, Europe

=== Pacific ===
Chile

- Easter Island (complete list) –

- Nga'ara, King (c.1835–pre-1860)
- Maurata, King (1859–1862)
- Kai Mako'i 'Iti, King (?–1863)
- Tepito, King (?)
- Gregorio, King (?)
- Atamu Tekena, King (?–pre-1892)

Fiji

- Kingdom of Fiji (complete list) –

- Seru Epenisa Cakobau, King (1871–1874)

- Colony of Fiji (complete list) –

British colony, 1874–1970
For details see the United Kingdom under British Isles, Europe

French Polynesia

- Kings of Alo –

- Filipo Meitala, King (1844–1862)
- Alia Segi, King (1862–?)
- Soane Malia Musulamu, King (c.1887–1929)

- Kingdom of Bora Bora (complete list) –

- Tapoa II, King (1831–1860)
- Teriʻimaevarua II, Queen (1860–1873)
- Teriʻimaevarua III, Queen (1873–1888)

- Kingdom of Huahine (complete list) –

- Teriʻitaria II, Queen (1815–1852)
- Ariʻmate, King (1852–1868)
- Tehaʻapapa II, Queen (1868–1893), under French protectorate from 1885–1890
- Marama, Regent (1884–1895)
- Teuhe, King (1888–1890)
- Tehaʻapapa III, Queen (1893–1895)

- Mangareva (complete list) –

- Te Maputeoa, Gregorio I, King (1830–1857)
- Joseph Gregorio II, King (1857–1868)
- Elia Teoa, Regent (c.1857))
- Maria Eutokia Toaputeitou, Regent (1857–1869)
- Akakio Tematereikura, Regent (1869)
- Arone Teikatoara, Regent (1869–1873)
- Bernardo Putairi, Regent (1873–1881)

- Kingdom of Raiatea (complete list) –

- Tamatoa IV, King (1831–1857)
- Tamatoa V, King (1857–1871)
- Tahitoe, King (1871–1881)
- Tehauroa, Queen (1881–1884)
- Tamatoa VI, King (1885–1888)
- Tuarii, Queen (1888–1896)

- Kings of Sigave –

- Petelo Keletaona, King (1842–1851)
- Alefosio Tamole, King (1851–?)
- Anise Tamole, King (c.1887)

- Kingdom of Tahiti –

- Pōmare I (1791–1803)

- Kings of Uvea (Wallis) –

- Soane-Patita Vaimua Lavelua, King (1830–1858)
- Falakika Seilala, Queen (1858–1869)
- Amelia Tokagahahau Aliki, Queen (1869–1895)

- Wallis and Futuna

Protectorate of France, 1887/1888–1959

New Zealand

- Cook Islands Federation (complete list) –

British colony, 1891–1901
For details see the United Kingdom under British Isles, Europe

- Colony of New Zealand (complete list) –

British colony, 1841–1907
For details see the United Kingdom under British Isles, Europe

- Monarchy of Niue (complete list) –

- Galiga, Patu-iki (?)
- Foki-mata, Patu-iki (?–c.1874)
- Pakieto, Patu-iki (c.1874–c.1875)
- Tui-toga, Patu-iki (1885–1887)
- Fata-a-iki, Patu-iki (1887–1896)
- Togia-Pulu-toaki, Patu-iki (1898–1900)

- British protectorate of Niue (complete list) –

British protectorate, 1900–1907
For details see the United Kingdom under British Isles, Europe

- Kingdom of Rarotonga (complete list) –

British protectorate, 1888–1901
For details see the United Kingdom under British Isles, Europe
- Makea Te Vaerua Ariki, Queen Regnant (1845–1857)
- Makea Daniela Ariki, High Chief (1857–1866)
- Makea Apera Ariki, High Chief (1866–1871)
- Makea Takau Ariki, Queen Regnant (1871–1911)

Samoa and American Samoa

- German Samoa (complete list) –

German colony, 1900–1914
For details see the German Empire under central Europe

- Malietoa dynasty –

- Malietoa Natuitasina, Malietoa (1841–1858)
- Moli, Malietoa (1858–1860)
- Malietoa Talavou Tonumaipe'a, Malietoa (1869–1880)
- Malietoa Laupepa, Malietoa (1875–1887, 1889–1898)
- Malietoa Tanumafili I, Malietoa (1898–1939)

- Manuʻa Islands (complete list) –

- Tauveve, Manu’a (?)
- Visala, Manu’a (?)
- Alalamua, Manu’a (?)
- Matelita, Manu’a (1891–1895)
- Elisala, Manu’a (1899–1909)

Solomon Islands

- British Solomon Islands (complete list) –

British protectorate, 1893–1978
For details see the United Kingdom under British Isles, Europe

Tonga

- Tuʻi Kanokupolu of Tonga

- Monarchs (complete list) –

- George Tupou I/ Tāufaʻāhau, King (1845–1893)
- George Tupou II, King (1893–1918)

- Prime ministers (complete list) –

- Tēvita ʻUnga, Prime minister (1872–1879)
- Shirley Waldemar Baker, Prime minister (1881–1890)
- Siaosi U. Tuku'aho, Prime minister (1890–1893)
- Siosateki Veikune, Prime minister (1893–1905)

- Kingdom of Tonga (1900–1970)

- Monarchs (complete list) –

- George Tupou II, King (1893–1918)

- Prime ministers (complete list) –

- Siosateki Veikune, Prime minister (1893–1905)

Tuvalu

- Gilbert and Ellice Islands (complete list) –

British colony, 1892–1976
For details see the United Kingdom under British Isles, Europe

United States: Hawaii

- Hawaiian Kingdom

- Monarchs (complete list) –

- Kamehameha III, King (1825–1854)
- Kamehameha IV, King (1855–1863)
- Kamehameha V, King (1863–1872)
- Lunalilo, King (1873–1874)
- Kalākaua, King (1874–1891)
- Liliʻuokalani, Queen (1891–1893)

- Kuhina Nui (complete list) –
- Keoni Ana, Kuhina Nui (1845–1855)
- Kaʻahumanu IV, Kuhina Nui (1855–1863)
- Mataio Kekūanaōʻa, Kuhina Nui (1863–1864)

- Provisional Government of Hawaii –

- Committee of Safety (1893–1894)

- Republic of Hawaii –

- Sanford B. Dole, President (1894–1898)

Vanuatu

- Anglo-French Joint Naval Commission (complete list) –

British-French Protectorate, 1887–1889, 1890–1906
For details see the United Kingdom under British Isles and France under western Europe

- Franceville, New Hebrides –

- Ferdinand Chevillard, President (1889)
- R. D. Polk, President (c.1890)

== See also ==
- List of state leaders in the 19th century (1801–1850)
- List of state leaders in the 20th century (1901–1950)
- List of state leaders in the 19th-century Holy Roman Empire
- List of state leaders in 19th-century British South Asia subsidiary states
- List of governors of dependent territories in the 19th century
- List of political entities in the 19th century
