= List of state leaders in the 19th century (1801–1850) =

This is a list of state leaders in the 19th century (1801–1850) AD, except for the leaders within British south Asia and its predecessor states, and those leaders within the Holy Roman Empire.

These polities are generally sovereign states, but excludes minor dependent territories, whose leaders can be found listed under territorial governors in the 19th century. For completeness, these lists can include colonies, protectorates, or other dependent territories that have since gained sovereignty.

Leaders of constituent states within the Holy Roman Empire, are excluded up to the time of German mediatisation (1801–1806), and found on this list of leaders in the 19th-century Holy Roman Empire.

== Africa ==
=== Africa: Central ===
Angola

- Kasanje Kingdom (complete list) –

- Malenge a Ngonga, King (1792–c.1810)
- Kitumba kya Ngonga, King (c.1810–1820)
- Kansanje kya Kambolo, King (c.1820s)
- Kihengo kya Kambolo, King (early 1830s)
- Kamasa ka Kiwende, King (mid 1830s)
- Mbumba a Kinguri, King (c.1840–1850)
- Kalunga ka Kisanga, King (1850)

- Kingdom of Kongo (complete list) –

- Henrique II, King (1794–1803)
- Garcia V, King (1803–1830)
- André II, King (1830–1842)
- Henrique III, King (1842–1857)

- Kingdom of Matamba (complete list) –

- unknown son of Ana III, King (1810–?)

- Portuguese Angola, (complete list) –

Colony, 1575–1951
For details see the Kingdom of Portugal under Southwest Europe

Cameroon

- Fondom of Bafut (complete list) –

- Achirimbi I, King (1799–1852)

- Kingdom of Bamum (complete list) –

- Mbouombouo, Mfon (1757–1814)
- Ngbetnkom, Mfon (1814–1817)
- Mbeikuo, Mfon (1817–1818)
- Ngouhouo, Mfon (1818–1865)

- Duala people (complete list) –

- Kwa a Kuo, ruler (18th–early 19th century)
- Bele a Doo, King (early 19th century)
- Ewonde a Kwane, Chief (early 19th century)
- Ngando a Kwa, King (c.1814–1846)
- Doo a Priso, Chief (19th century)
- Mbape a Bele, Chief (19th century)

- Kamerun (complete list) –

German colony, 1884–1916
For details see the German Empire under central Europe

Central African Republic

Chad

- Sultanate of Bagirmi (complete list) –

- ‘Abd ar-Rahman Gawrang, Mbangi (1785–1806)
- Malam Ngarmaba Bira, Mbangi (1806)
- ‘Uthman Burkomanda III al-Kabir, Mbangi (1806–1807)
- Malam Ngarmaba Bira, Mbangi (1807)
- ‘Uthman Burkomanda III al-Kabir, Mbangi (1807)
- Muhammad III, Mbangi (1807)
- ‘Uthman Burkomanda III al-Kabir, Mbangi (1807–1846)
- ‘Abdul Qadir II al-Mahdi, Mbangi (1846–1858)

- Wadai Empire (complete list) –

- Muhammad Salih Derret ibn Jawda, Kolak (1795–1803)
- Abd al-Karim Sabun, Kolak (1803–1813)
- Muhammad Busata ibn ‘Abd al-Karim, Kolak (1813–1813)
- Yusuf Kharifayn ibn ‘Abd al-Qadir, Kolak (1813–1829)
- Raqib ibn Yusuf ‘Abd al-Qadir, Kolak (1829–1829)
- Muhammad ‘Abd al-‘Aziz Dhawiyi ibn Radama (1829–1835)
- Adham ibn Muhammad ‘Abd al-‘Aziz, Kolak (1835–1835)
- ‘Izz ad-Din Muhammad al-Sharif ibn Salih Derret, Kolak (1835–1858)

Congo: Belgian; today, the Democratic Republic of the Congo

- Kuba Kingdom (complete list) –

- Kata Mbula, Nyim (1776–1810)
- Mikope Mbula, Nyim (1810–1840)
- Bope Mobinji, Nyim (1840–1885)

- Kingdom of Luba (complete list) –

- Ilunga Sungu, muLopwe (1780–1809)
- Kasongo Mukaya, muLopwe in rebellion (c.1800–?)
- Kumwimba Ngombe, muLopwe (1809–1837)
- Ndaye Muzinga, usurper muLopwe (1837–1837)
- Ilunga Kabale, muLopwe (1837–1864)

- Lunda Empire (complete list) –

- Nawej II Ditend, Mwaant Yaav (c.1800–1852)

Congo: French; today, the Republic of the Congo

- Kingdom of Loango (complete list) –

- N'Gangue M'voumbe Makosso Ma Nombo, King (early 19th century)
- N'Gangue M'voumbe Makosso Ma N'Sangou, King (1840-c.1883)

Equatorial Guinea

- Spanish Guinea (complete list) –

Colony, 1778–1968
For details see Spain in southwest Europe

Gabon

- Kingdom of Orungu (complete list) –

- Rénwombi "Mpolo", Agamwinboni (1790–1810)
- Ogul'Issogwe Rogombe, Agamwinboni (1810–1840)
- Ombango Rogombe "Ikinda" / King Pascal, Agamwinboni (1840–1862)

São Tomé and Príncipe

- Portuguese São Tomé and Príncipe (complete list) –

Colony, 1470–1951
For details see the Kingdom of Portugal under Southwest Europe

=== Africa: East ===
Great Lakes area

Burundi

- Kingdom of Burundi (complete list) –

- Ntare IV, King (c.1796–c.1850)
- Mwezi IV, King (c.1850–1908)

Kenya

- Sultanate of Mombasa (complete list) –

Independence disputed with Oman
- Ahmad ibn Muhammad al-Mazru‘i, Sultan (1782–1811)
- ‘Abd Allah ibn Ahmad al-Mazru‘i, Sultan (1811–1823)
Omani Suzerainty
- Sulayman ibn ‘Ali al-Mazru‘i, Sultan (1823–1826)

- Pate Sultanate (complete list) –

Nabahani dynasty

- Fumo Madi ibn Abi Bakr, Mfalume (1779–1809)
- Ahmad ibn Shaykh, Mfalume (1809–1813)
- Fumo Luti Kipunga ibn Fumo Madi, Mfalume (1813–1818)
- Fumo Luti ibn Ahmad, Mfalume (1818–?)
- Bwana Shaykh ibn Fumo Madi, Mfalume (?–1823, ?)
- Bwana Waziri ibn Bwana Tamu, Mfalume (1823–?, ?–1830)
- Fumo Bakari ibn Shaykh, Mfalume (1830–1840)
- Ahmad ibn Fumo Bakari, Mfalume (1840–1856)

Rwanda

- Kingdom of Rwanda (complete list) –

- Yuhi IV Gahindiro, King (1746–1802)
- Mutara II Rwogera, King (1802–1853)

South Sudan

- Shilluk Kingdom

- Nyokwejø, Rädh (c.1780–1820)

Tanzania

- Kingdom of Unyanyembe –

- Ifundikila, King (1840–1858)

Uganda

- Ankole (complete list) –

- Rwebishengye, Omugabe (?–1811)
- Kayungu, Omugabe (1811–?)
- Gasyonga I, Omugabe (?–1839)
- Mutambuka, Omugabe (1839–1873)

- Buganda (complete list) –

- Semakookiro, Kabaka (c.1797-c.1814)
- Kamaanya, Kabaka (1814–1832)
- Suuna II, Kabaka (1832–1856)

- Bunyoro (complete list) –

- Nyamutukura Kyebambe III, Omukama (1786–1835)
- Nyabongo II, Omukama (1835–1848)
- Olimi V, Omukama (1848–1852)

Horn of Africa area

Djibouti

Eritrea

Ethiopia

- Ethiopian Empire (complete list) –

- Demetros, Emperor (1800–1801)
- Egwale Seyon, Emperor (1801–1818)
- Iyoas II, Emperor (1818–1821)
- Gigar, Emperor (1821–1826)
- Baeda Maryam III, Emperor (1826)
- Gigar, Emperor (1826–1830)
- Iyasu IV, Emperor (1830–1832)
- Gebre Krestos, Emperor (1832)
- Sahle Dengel, Emperor (1832)
- Gebre Krestos, Emperor (1832)
- Sahle Dengel, Emperor (1832–1840)
- Yohannes III, Emperor (1840–1841)
- Sahle Dengel, Emperor (1841–1845)
- Yohannes III, Emperor (1845)
- Sahle Dengel, Emperor (1845–1850)
- Yohannes III, Emperor (1850–1851)

- Sultanate of Aussa (complete list) –

- Aydahis ibn Kadhafo Mahammad, Sultan (1779–1801)
- Aydahis ibn Mahammad ibn Aydahis, Amoyta (1801–1832)
- Hanfere ibn Aydahis, Amoyta (1832–1862)

- Kingdom of Garo (complete list) –

- Dukamo, Tato (1790–1845)
- Ogata, Tato (1845–1865)

- Kingdom of Gera (complete list) –

- Tulu Ganje, Moti (?–c.1840)
- Abba Baso, Moti (c.1840)
- Abba Rago I, Moti (c.1845–c.1860)

- Kingdom of Gomma (complete list) –

- Mijyu, Moti (?–c.1820)
- Abba Manno, Moti (c.1820–c.1840)
- Abba Bagibo, Moti (early 19th century)
- Abba Rebo, Moti (?–1856)

- Kingdom of Gumma (complete list) –

- Adam, Moti, Founder (late 18th century)
- Oncho, Moti (c.1810)
- Jawe, Moti (c.1840–1854)

- Emirate of Harar (complete list) –

- Ahmad II ibn Muhammad, Emīr (1794–1821)
- `Abd ar-Rahman ibn Muhammad, Emīr (1821–1825)
- `Abd al-Karim ibn Muhammad, Emīr (1825–1834)
- Abu Bakr II ibn `Abd al-Munan, Emīr (1834–1852)

- Kingdom of Jimma (complete list) –

- Abba Magal, Moti (c.1800)
- Abba Rago, Moti (early 19th century)
- Abba Jifar I, Moti (c.1830–c.1855)

- Kingdom of Kaffa (complete list) –

- Hoti Gaocho or Beshi Sheroch, King (1798–1821)
- Gaha Nechocho or Gali Sheroch, King (1821–1845)
- Gawi Nechocho or Haji Ginoch, King (1845–1854)

- Leqa Neqemte (complete list) –

- Bekere Godana, Moti (1841–1868)

- Kingdom of Limmu-Ennarea (complete list) –

- Bofo, Abba Gomoli I, Supera (1800–1825)
- Ibsa, Abba Bagibo, Supera (1825–1861)

- Welayta: Tigre dynasty (complete list) –

- Amado, Kawa (1800–1835)
- Damota, Kawa (1835–1845)
- Gobe, Kawa (1845–1886)

Somalia (including Somaliland)

- Sultanate of the Geledi (complete list) –

- Mahamud Ibrahim, Sultan (mid-18th century–1828)
- Yusuf Mahamud Ibrahim, Sultan (1828–1848
- Ahmed Yusuf, Sultan (1848–1878)

- Majeerteen Sultanate (complete list) –

- Suldaan Maxamuud "Xawaadane" Suldaan Yuusuf Suldaan Cali, King (?–1815)
- Suldaan Cismaan "Bah-Dir" Suldaan Maxamuud Suldaan Yuusuf, King (1815–1842)
- Suldaan Yuusuf "Bah-Yaaquub" Suldaan Maxamuud Suldaan Yuusuf, King (1842–1844)
- Suldaan Maxamuud Suldaan Cismaan Suldaan Maxamuud, King (1844–1860)

- Isaaq Sultanate (complete list) –

- Guled Abdi, Sultan (~1750s-1808)
- Farah Guled, Sultan (1808-1845)
- Hassan Farah, Sultan (1845-1870)

- British Somaliland (complete list) –

Protectorate, 1884–1940, 1941–1960
For details see the United Kingdom under British Isles, Europe

Indian Ocean

Comoros

- Sultanate of Mwali (complete list) –

- Ramanetaka, Sultan (1830–1842)
- Ravao, Tsivandini, Regent (1842–1849)
- Djoumbé Fatima, Queen/Sultan (1842–1865, 1874–1878)

- Sultanate of Ndzuwani (complete list) –

- Alawi bin Husain, Sultan (1796–1816)
- Abdallah bin Alawi, Sultan (1816–1832, 1833–1836)
- Ali bin Salim, Sultan (1832–1833)
- Saidi Alawi bin Abdallah, Sultan (1836–1837)
- Salim bin Alawi, Sultan (1837–1852)

Madagascar

- Boina Kingdom (complete list) –

- Ravahiny, Queen (c.1778–1808)
- Tsimalomo, King (1808–c.1822)
- Maka (Andrianaresy), (pretender) King (1808)
- Andriantsoly, King (1822–1832)
- Oantitsy, Regent (f) (1828–1829)
- Oantitsy, Queen (1832–1836)
- Tsiomeko, Queen (1836–1840)

- Merina Kingdom

- Monarchs (complete list) –

- Andrianampoinimerina, King (1787–1810)
- Radama I, King (1810–1828)
- Ranavalona I, Queen (1828–1861)

- Prime ministers (complete list) –

- Andriamihaja, Prime minister (1828–1833)
- Rainiharo, Prime minister (1833–1852)

Mauritius

- Isle de France (complete list) –

French colony, 1715–1810
For details see France under western Europe

- British Mauritius (complete list) –

Colony, 1810–1968
For details see the United Kingdom under British Isles, Europe

Seychelles

- Colony of Seychelles

Part of British Mauritius, 1811–1903
For details see the United Kingdom under British Isles, Europe

=== Africa: Northcentral ===
Libya

- Karamanli dynasty of Ottoman Tripolitania (complete list) –

- Yusuf Karamanli, Pasha (1795–1832)
- Ali II Karamanli, Pasha (1832–1835)

Tunisia

- Beylik of Tunis

- Beys (complete list) –

- Hammuda ibn Ali, Bey (1782–1814)
- Uthman ibn Ali, Bey (1814)
- Mahmud ibn Muhammad, Bey (1814–1824)
- Al-Husayn II ibn Mahmud, Bey (1824–1835)
- Mustafa ibn Mahmud, Bey (1835–1837)
- Ahmad I ibn Mustafa, Bey (1837–1855)

- Grand viziers (complete list) –

- Yusuf Sahib al-Tabi, Grand vizier (1815–1822)
- Husain Khoja, Grand vizier (1822–1829)
- Rashid al-Shakir Sahib al-Taba'a, Grand vizier (1829–1837)
- Mustapha Khaznadar, Grand vizier (1837–1873)

=== Africa: Northeast ===
Egypt

- Khedivate of Egypt (complete list) –

- Muhammad Ali, Khedive (1805–1848)
- Ibrahim Pasha, Khedive (1848)
- Abbas Helmi I, Khedive (1848–1854)

Sudan

- Sultanate of Darfur (complete list) –

- Abd al-Rahman, Sultan (1785/6–c.1801)
- Muhammad al-Fadl, Sultan (c.1801–1838)
- Muhammad al-Husayn, Sultan (1838–1873)

- Hamaj Regency of the Funj Sultanate

- Sultans (complete list) –

- Ranfi, Sultan (1798–1804)
- Agban, Sultan (1804–1805)
- Badi VII, Sultan (1805–1821)

- Regents (complete list) –

- Idris wad Abu Likayik, Regent (1798–1804)
- Adlan wad Abu Likayik, Regent (1804–1805)

- Taqali (complete list) –

- Abakr I, Mukūk (1800–1820)
- Umar II, Mukūk (1800–1835)
- Ahmad, Mukūk (1835–1840)
- Maryud, Mukūk (1840–1843)
- Nasir, Mukūk (1843–c.1860)

=== Africa: Northwest ===
Algeria

- Ottoman Algeria (complete list) –

Vassal state, 1515–1830
For details see the Ottoman Empire under west Asia

- French Algeria (complete list) –

French Départements, 1830–1962
For details see France under western Europe

Morocco and Western Sahara

- Morocco: Alaouite dynasty (complete list) –

- Slimane, Sultan (1792–1822)
- Abd al-Rahman, Sultan (1822–1859)

=== Africa: South ===
Botswana

Eswatini/ Swaziland

- Kingdom of Eswatini (Swaziland)

- Kings (complete list) –

- Ndvungunye, King (1780–1815)
- Sobhuza I, King (1815–1839)
- Mswati II, King (1840–1868)

- tiNdlovukati (complete list) –

- Lomvula Mndzebele, Ndlovukati (1780–1815), Queen Regent (1815)
- Lojiba Simelane, Ndlovukati (1815–1840), Queen Regent (1836–1840)
- Tsandzile Ndwandwe, Ndlovukati (1840–1875), Queen Regent (1868–1875)

Lesotho

- Basutoland (complete list) –

- Moshoeshoe I, King or Paramount Chief (1822–1870)

Malawi

Mozambique

- Angoche Sultanate –

- Hasani Usufu, Sultan (1849–1861)

- Gaza Empire (complete list) –

- Soshangane, ruler (1825–1858)

- Portuguese Mozambique (complete list) –

Colony, 1498–1972
For details see the Kingdom of Portugal under Southwest Europe

Namibia

- Gciriku (complete list) –

- Shimwemwe (1785–1805)

South Africa

- Griqualand West –

- Andries Waterboer, Kaptijn (1820–1852)

- Mthethwa Paramountcy –

- Jobe kaKhayi, Chief (?–1806)
- Dingiswayo, Chief (1806–1817)

- Zulu Kingdom (complete list) –

- Senzangakhona kaJama, King (1781–1816)

- Cape Colony (complete list) –

British colony, 1795–1910
For details see the United Kingdom under British Isles, Europe

- Colony of Natal (complete list) –

British colony, 1843–1910
For details see the United Kingdom under British Isles, Europe

Zambia

- Barotseland (complete list) –

- Mwananyanda Liwale, Mbumu wa Litunga (?–1812)
- Mulambwa Santulu, Mbumu wa Litunga (1812–1830)
- Silumelume, Mbumu wa Litunga (1830)
- Mubukwanu, Mbumu wa Litunga (1830–1838)
- Imasiku, Mbumu wa Litunga (1838)
- Sebetwane, Morêna (1838–1851)

- Kazembe –

- Lukwesa Ilunga, Mwata (1760–1805)
- Kanyembo Keleka Mayi, Mwata (1805–1850)
- Kapumba Mwongo Mfwama, Mwata (1850–1854)

- Ngoni (complete list) –

- Zwangendaba, Paramount Chief (1815–1848)
- Mpezeni I, Paramount Chief (1848–1900)

Zimbabwe

- Mthwakazi –

- Mzilikazi (1820–1868)

- Rozvi Empire (complete list) –

- Changamire Dhafa, King (c.1790–1824)
- Changamire Baswi, King (c.1825)
- Changamire Chirisamuru II, King (c.1828–1831)
- Changamire Tohwechipi Zharare, King (1831–1866)

=== Africa: West ===
Benin

- Kingdom of Agwe –

- Komlagan, King (1812–1821)
- Katraya, King (1821–1833)
- Agunu, King (1833–1834)
- Toji, King (1834–1844)
- Kponton I avumbe, King (1844–1846)
- Hanto Tona, King (1846–1858)

- Kingdom of Benin (complete list) –

- Akengbuda, Oba (1750–1804)
- Obanosa, Oba (1804–1816)
- Ogbebo, Oba (1816)
- Osemwende, Oba (1816–1848)
- Adolo, Oba (1848–1897)
See also Ovonramwen

- Dahomey (Dahomey kings, French presidents) –

Vassal of the Oyo Empire, 1740–1823
- Adandozan, King (1797–1818)
- Ghezo, King (1818–1858)

- Hogbonu (complete list) –

- Huffon, Ahosu (1794–1807)
- Ajohan, Ahosu (1807–1816)
- Toyi, Ahosu (1816–1818)
- Hueze, Ahosu (1818–1828)
- Toyon, Ahosu (1828–1836)
- Meyi, Ahosu (1836–1848)
- Sodji, Ahosu (1848–1864)

- Ketu (Benin) (complete list) –

- Ajibolu, Oba of Ketu (1795–1816)

Burkina Faso

- Kingdom of Koala (complete list) –

- Baalisongi, King (?)
- Yencaari, King (c.1801–c.1809)
- Kalinkuma, King (?)
- Yenbuado, King (1818–?)
- Yensombu, King (?)
- Yentugri, King (?)

- Mossi Kingdom of Bilanga (complete list) –

Buricimba dynasty

- Tontuoriba, Bilanbedo (?)
- Lisongi, Bilanbedo (?)
- Baahamma, Bilanbedo (?)

- Mossi Kingdom of Con (complete list) –

- Gmarba, ruler (c.19th century)
- Wori, ruler (c.19th century)
- Gamambu, ruler (c.19th century)
- Pangangri, ruler (c.19th century)
- Mabungu, ruler (c.19th century)
- Bandigoo, ruler (19th century)

- Mossi Kingdom of Gwiriko (complete list) –

- Magan Wule Wattara, ruler (1749–1809)
- Dramani, ruler (1809–1809)
- Dyori Wattara, ruler (1809–1839)
- Bako Moru Wattara, ruler (1839–1851)

- Mossi Kingdom of Liptako (complete list) –

- Brahima bi Saydu, Ja-oro (1758–1810)
- Brahima bi Saydu, Almami (1810–1817)
- Salifu bi Hama, Almami (1817–1832)
- Brahima Sori bi Hama, Almami (1832–1861)

- Mossi Kingdom of Macakoali (complete list) –

- Yembuaro, Boopo (19th century)

- Mossi Kingdom of Nungu (complete list) –

- Baahamma, Nunbado (1791–1822)
- Yenhamma, Nunbado (1822–1831)
- Yencirima, Nunbado (1831–1843)
- Yencabri, Nunbado (1843–1846)
- Yempabu, Nunbado (1846–1856)

- Mossi Kingdom of Piéla (complete list) –

- Baahamma, Pielabedo (19th century)
- Yembuado, Pielabedo (19th century)
- Yentema, Pielabedo (19th century)
- Yentagima, Pielabedo (19th century–1836)
- Yembrima, Pielabedo (1836–1844)
- Yenkpaari, Pielabedo (1844–1851)

- Mossi Kingdom of Wogodogo (complete list) –

- Naaba Dulugu, Moogo-naaba (1783–1802)
- Naaba Sawadogo, Moogo-naaba (1802–1834)
- Naaba Karfo, Moogo-naaba (1834–1842)
- Naaba Baongo I, Moogo-naaba (1842–1850)
- Naaba Kutu I, Moogo-naaba (1850–1871)

- Mossi Kingdom of Yatenga (complete list) –

- Rima Naaba Saaga, Yatenga naaba (1787–1803)
- Rima Naaba Kaongo, Yatenga naaba (1803–1806)
- Rima Naaba Tuguri, Yatenga naaba (1806–1822)
- Naaba Koom I, Yatenga naaba (1822–1825)
- Naaba Korogo, Yatenga naaba (1825–1825)
- Naaba Ragongo, Yatenga naaba (1825–1831)
- Naaba Wobgo II, Yatenga naaba (1831–1831)
- Naaba Nyambe Moogo, Yatenga naaba (1831–1834)
- Rima Naaba Totebaldbo, Yatenga naaba (1834–1850)
- Rima Naaba Yemde, Yatenga naaba (1850–1877)

Cape Verde

- Portuguese Cape Verde (complete list) –

Colony, 1462–1951
For details see the Kingdom of Portugal under Southwest Europe

Gambia

- Gambia Colony and Protectorate (complete list) –

British colony and protectorate, 1821–1965
For details see the United Kingdom under British Isles, Europe

- Kombo (complete list) –

- Suling Jatta, King (pre-1840–1855)
- Suling Jatta, King (1840–1855)

Ghana

- Kingdom of Ashanti (complete list) –

- Osei Kwame Panyin, Asantehene (1777–1803)
- Opoku Fofie, Asantehene (1803–1804)
- Osei Bonsu, Asantehene (1804–1824)
- Osei Yaw Akoto, Asantehene (1824–1834)
- Kwaku Dua I Panyin, Asantehene (1834–1867)

- Fante Confederacy (complete list) –
- Gold Coast (complete list) –

British colony, 1821–1957
For details see the United Kingdom under British Isles, Europe

Guinea

Guinea-Bissau

- Portuguese Guinea (complete list) –

Colony, 1474–1951
For details see the Kingdom of Portugal under Southwest Europe

Ivory Coast

- Gyaaman (complete list) –

- Biri Kofi Kadyo, Gyaamanhene (1790–1810)
- Kwadwo Adinkra Kadyo, Gyaamanhene (1810–1820)
- Fofie, Gyaamanhene (1820–1830)
- Kwasi Yeboa, Gyaamanhene (1830–1850)
- Kwadwo Agyeman, Gyaamanhene (1850–1895)

Liberia

- Republic of Maryland (complete list) –

- James Hall, Governor (1834–1836)
- Oliver Holmes, Jr., Governor (1836)
- Three-member Committee (1836)
- John Brown Russwurm, Governor (1836–1851)

- Colony of Liberia (1821–1847)
- Liberia (complete list) –

- Joseph Jenkins Roberts, President (1848–1856)

Mali

- Bamana Empire –

- Mansong Diarra, Faama (1795–1808)
- Da Monzon Diarra, Faama (1808–?)

- Toucouleur Empire

- El Hadj Umar Tall, ruler (1850–1864)

- Kénédougou Kingdom –

- Mansa Douala, Faama (?–1876)
- Tieba Traoré, Faama (1876–1893)
- Babemba Traoré, Faama (1893–1898)

- Massina Empire –

- Seku Amadu, Almami (c.1818–1845)
- Amadu II of Masina, Almami (1845–1852)

Mauritania

Niger

- Sultanate of Damagaram (complete list) –

- Ahmadou dan Tanimoun, Sultan (1799–1812)
- Sulayman, Sultan (1812–1822)
- Ibrahim, Sultan (1843–1851)

- Dendi Kingdom: Askiya dynasty (complete list) –

- Fodi Maÿroumfa, Askiya (1798–1805)
- Tomo, Askiya (1805–1823)
- Bassarou Missi Izé, Askiya (1823–1842)
- Boumi, Askiya (1842–1845)
- Koïzé Babba, Askiya (1845–1864)

- Dosso Kingdom (complete list) –

- Zarmakoy Gounabi, King (?)
- Zarmakoy Amirou, King (?)

Nigeria

- Adamawa Emirate –

- Modibo Adama, Baban-Lamido (1809–1847)
- Hamidu bi Adama, Regent (1847–?)
- Muhammadu Lawal, Baban-Lamido (1847–1872)

- Akwa Akpa (Old Calabar) –

- Ekpenyong Offiong Okoho, King (1786–1805)
- Ekpenyong Effiom Okoho Eyamba III, King (1805–1814)
- Effiom Edem Ekpo Effiom I Eyamba IV, King (1814–1834)
- Edem Ekpenyong Offiong Okoho Eyamba V, King (1834–1847)
- Effiom Okoho Asibong I Ekpo Minika, King (1849–1852)

- Aro Confederacy

- Okoro Idozuka, leader (early 19th-century)

- Kingdom of Bonny –

- Opubo Annie Pepple the Great, King (1792–1828)
- Adumtaye-Bereibibo Adapa Bristol-Alagbariya, King (1828–1830)
- William Dappa Pepple I, King (1830–1854, 1861–1866)

- Bornu Empire (Kanem–Bornu)

Sayfawa dynasty
- Ahmad, Mai (1792–1808)
- Dunama IX Lefiami, Mai (1808–1816)
- Muhammad VIII, Mai (1816–1820)
- Ibrahim IV of Bornu, Mai (1820–1846)
- Ali V Dalatumi, Mai (1846)
House of Kanemi
- Muhammad al-Amin al-Kanemi, Shehu (1809–1837)
- Umar Kura, Shehu (1837–1853, 1854–1881)

- Egba Ake –

- Shodeke, ruler (1829–1845)
- Shomoye, Regent (1845–1846, 1862–1868)
- Okukenu, Regent (1846–1854), Alake (1854–1862)

- Sultanate of Kano (complete list) –

- Muhammad al-Walid, Sultan (1781–1805)

- Kano Emirate

- Emirs (complete list) –

- Suleimanu dan AbaHama, Emir (1805–1819)
- Ibrahim Dabo dan Mahmudu, Emir (1819–1846)
- Usman I Maje Ringim dan Dabo, Emir (1846–1855)

- Grand Viziers

- Muhammadu Bakatsine, Grand Vizier (1807–?)

- Gobir –

- Yakubu, Sultan (1795–1801)
- Muhamman Bunu Nafata, Sultan (1801–1803)
- Yunfa, Sultan (1803–1808)

- Ilorin Emirate –

- Abdusalami dan Salih Alimi, Emir (1824–1842)
- Shita dan Salih Alimi, Emir (1842–1860)

- Lagos (complete list) –

- Ologun Kutere, Oba (1780–1801) or until 1803
- Adele Ajosun, Oba (1811–1821, 1835–1837)
- Oṣinlokun Ajan(Oshinlokun, Eshinlokun) (1821–1829)
- Idewu Ojulari, Oba (1829–1832) or until 1835
- Oluwole, Oba (1837–1841)
- Akitoye, Oba (1841–1845, 1851–1853)
- Kosoko, Oba (1845–1851)

- Nembe Kingdom (complete list) –

- Kuko Mingi IV, King (1800–1832)
- Amain Mingi V, King (1832–1846)
- Kuki, King (1846)
- Kien Mingi VI, King (1846–1863)

- Kingdom of Nri (complete list) –

- Ezimilo, Eze Nri (1795–1886)

- Oyo Empire (complete list) –

- Majotu, Alaafin (1802–1830)
- Amodo, Alaafin (1830–1833)
- Oluewu, Alaafin (1833–1835)
- Atiba Atobatele, Alaafin (1837–1859)

- Sokoto Caliphate

- Sultans (complete list) –
- Grand viziers (complete list) –

- Suleja Emirate (complete list) –

- Muhammadu Makau, Emir (1804–1825)
- Jatau "Abu Ja", Emir (1825–1851)

- Yauri Emirate –

- Muhammadu Dan Ayi dan Ahmadu Jerabana Albishir, Emir (1799–1829)
- Ibrahimu dan Muhammadu Dan Ayi, Emir (1829–1835)
- Jibrilu Gajeren Sarki dan Muhammadu Dan Ayi, Emir (1835–1844)
- Abu Bakr Jatau dan Mustafa Gazari, Emir (1844–1848)
- Jibrilu Gajeren Sarki dan Muhammadu Dan Ayi, Emir (1848–1849)
- Ya`quba dan Jibrilu Gajeren Sarki, Emir (1849–1850)
- Sulaymanu Dan Addo dan Ibrahimu, Emir (1850–1871)

- Lagos Colony (complete list) –

British colony, 1821–1957
For details see the United Kingdom under British Isles, Europe

Senegal

- Cayor (complete list) –

- Amari Ngone Ndèla Kumba Fal, Damel (1790–1809)
- Biram Fatma Cub Fal, Damel (1809–1832)
- Maysa Tènde Jor Samba Fal, Damel (1832–1855)

- Imamate of Futa Toro (complete list) –

- Abdelkedir, Almaami (1776–1804)
- unknown Almaami (1804–1859)

- Kingdom of Jolof (complete list) –

- Mba Buri-Nyabu, Buur-ba (1800–1818)
- Birayamb Kumba-Gey, Buur-ba (1818–1838)
- al-Buri Tam, Buur-ba (1838–1845)
- Baka Kodu, Buur-ba (1845–1847)
- Birayamb Aram, Buur-ba (1847–1849)
- Birayma-Penda, Buur-ba (1849)
- Mbanyi-Paate, Buur-ba (1849)
- Lat-Koddu, Buur-ba (1849)
- Birayamb Ma-Dyigen, Buur-ba (1850–1855)

- Saloum (complete list) –

- Balleh N'Gougou N'Dao (or Ballé Khordia Ndao), Maad Saloum (1825–1853)

- Kingdom of Sine (complete list) –

- Ama Joof Gnilane Faye Joof, Maad a Sinig (1825–1853)
- Kumba Ndoffene Famak Joof, Maad a Sinig (1853–23 August 1871)

- Waalo (complete list) –

- Njak Kumba Xuri Yay Mboj, King (1795–1805)
- Saayodo Yaasin Mboj, King (1805–1810)
- Kuli Mbaaba Mboj, King (1810–1816)
- Amar Faatim Mborso Mboj, King (1816–1825)
- Yerim Mbañik Teg-Rella Mboj, King (1825–1827)
- Fara Penda Adam Sal Mboj, King (1827–1830)
- Xerfi Xari Daaro, King (1830–1832)
- Fara Penda Adam Sal Mboj, King (1832–1833)
- Xerfi Xari Daaro, King (1833–1835)
- Fara Penda Adam Sal Mboj, King (1835–1840)
- Mö Mboj Maalik Mboj, King (1840–1855)

Sierra Leone

- Kingdom of Koya (complete list) –

- Farima IV, Bai (1793–1807)
- Foki, Bai (1807–1817)
- Moriba Kindo Bangura, Bai (1817–1825)
- Kunia Banna, Bai (1825–1826)
- Fatima Brima Kama, Bai-Queen (1826–1840)
- Moribu Kindo, Bai (1840–1859)

- Sierra Leone Colony and Protectorate, British colony (complete list) –

British colony and protectorate, 1808–1961
For details see the United Kingdom under British Isles, Europe

Togo

== Americas ==
=== Americas: Caribbean ===
Antigua

- Colonial Antigua (complete list) –

British colony, 1632–1981
For details see the United Kingdom under British Isles, Europe

The Bahamas

- Colony of the Bahamas (complete list) –

British colony, 1648–1973
For details see the United Kingdom under British Isles, Europe

Barbados

- Colonial Barbados (complete list) –

British colony, 1625–1966
For details see the United Kingdom under British Isles, Europe

Cuba

- Captaincy General of Cuba (complete list) –

Spanish Colony, 1607–1898
For details see Spain in southwest Europe

Dominica

- British Dominica (complete list) –

British Colony, 1763–1978
For details see the United Kingdom under British Isles, Europe

Saint Vincent and the Grenadines

- Colonial Saint Vincent and the Grenadines (complete list) –

British Colony, 1763–1979
For details see the United Kingdom under British Isles, Europe

Dominican Republic

- First Dominican Republic (complete list) –

- Tomás Bobadilla, Manuel Jimenes, Carlos Moreno, Mariano Echavarria, Jose Maria Caminero, Francisco del Rosario Sanchez, Matias Ramon Mella, Manuel Maria Valverde, Francisco Xavier Abreu, Felix Mercenario, Silvano Pujol, Juan Pablo Duarte, Central Government Board (1844)

- Pedro Santana, President (1844–1848)

- Félix Mercenario, Domingo de la Rocha, José María Caminero, Manuel Jimenes, Council of Secretaries of State (1848)

- Manuel Jimenes, President (1848–1849)
- Buenaventura Báez, President (1849–1853)

Haiti

- Saint-Domingue (complete list) –

French Colony, 1625–1804
For details see France in western Europe

- First Empire of Haiti (complete list) –

- Jean-Jacques Dessalines, Emperor (1804–1806)

- State of Haiti (complete list) –

- Henri Christophe, President (1806–1811), King (1811–1820)

- Kingdom of Haiti (complete list) –

- Henri Christophe, President (1806–1811), King (1811–1820)

- Republic of Haiti (1806–1820) (complete list) –

- Bruno Blanchet, Acting President (1807)
- Alexandre Pétion, President (1807–1818)
- Jean-Pierre Boyer, President (1818–1843)

- Republic of Haiti (1820–1849) (complete list) –

- Jean-Pierre Boyer, President (1818–1843)
- Charles Rivière-Hérard, President (1843–1844)
- Philippe Guerrier, President (1844–1845)
- Jean-Louis Pierrot, President (1845–1846)
- Jean-Baptiste Riché, President (1846–1847)
- Faustin Soulouque, President (1847–1849), Emperor (1849–1859)

Netherlands

- Curaçao and Dependencies (complete list) –

Dutch colony 1634–1828, 1845–1954
For details see the Netherlands under western Europe

Saint Lucia

- French Saint Lucia (complete list) –

French colony, 1762–1802
For details see France in western Europe

- Colonial Saint Lucia (complete list) –

British colony, 1802–1979
For details see the United Kingdom under British Isles, Europe

Trinidad and Tobago

- Colonial Trinidad and Tobago (complete list) –

British colony, 1797–1962
For details see the United Kingdom under British Isles, Europe

=== Americas: Central ===
Belize

- Black River Settlements (complete list) –

British colony, 1749–1862
For details see the United Kingdom under British Isles, Europe

Costa Rica

- Free State of Costa Rica (complete list) –

- Juan Mora Fernández, Head of State (1825–1833)
- José Rafael Gallegos, Head of State (1833–1835)
- Braulio Carrillo Colina, Head of State (1835–1837)
- Juan Mora Fernández, Head of State (1837)
- Manuel Aguilar Chacón, Head of State (1837–1838)
- Braulio Carrillo Colina, Head of State (1838–1842)
- Francisco Morazán, Head of State (1842)
- António Pinto Soares, Head of State (1842)
- José María Alfaro Zamora, Head of State (1842–1844)
- Francisco María Oreamuno Bonilla, Head of State (1844)
- José Rafael Gallegos, Head of State (1845–1846)
- José María Alfaro Zamora, Head of State (1846–1847)
- José Castro Madriz, Head of State (1847–1848), President (1848–1849)

- First Costa Rican Republic (complete list) –

- José Castro Madriz, Head of State (1847–1848), President (1848–1849)
- Miguel Mora Porras, President (1849)
- Juan Mora Porras, President (1849–1859)

El Salvador

- El Salvador (complete list) –

- Pedro Barriere, Political Chief (1821)
- José Matías Delgado, Political Chief (1821–1823)
- Vicente Filísola, Political Chief (1823)
- Felipe Codallos, Political Chief (1823)
- Consultive Junta (1823)
- Mariano Prado, Provisional Political Chief (1823–1824)
- Juan Manuel Rodríguez, Head of State (1824)
- Mariano Prado, Head of State (1824)
- Juan Vicente Villacorta, Head of State (1824–1826)
- Mariano Prado, Acting Head of State (1826–1829)
- José María Cornejo, Head of State (1829–1830)
- José Damián Villacorta, Head of State (1830)
- José María Cornejo, Head of State (1830–1832)
- Francisco Morazán, Provisional Head of State (1832)
- Joaquín de San Martín, Head of State (1832)
- Mariano Prado, Head of State (1832–1833)
- Joaquín de San Martín, Head of State (1833–1834)
- Carlos Salazar Castro, Provisional Head of State (1834)
- José Gregorio Salazar, Provisional Head of State (1834)
- Joaquín Escolán y Balibrera, Provisional Head of State (1834)
- José María Silva, Acting Head of State (1834–1835)
- Joaquín Escolán y Balibrera, Acting Head of State (1835)
- Nicolás Espinoza, Head of State (1835)
- Francisco Gómez, Acting Head of State (1835–1836)
- Diego Vigil y Cocaña, Head of State (1836–1837)
- Timoteo Menéndez, Acting Head of State (1837)
- Diego Vigil y Cocaña, Head of State (1837–1838)
- Timoteo Menéndez, Acting Head of State (1838–1839)
- Antonio José Cañas, Acting Head of State (1839)
- Francisco Morazán, Head of State (1839–1840)
- José María Silva, Acting Head of State (1840)
- Municipal Council of San Salvador, (1840)
- Antonio José Cañas, Acting Head of State (1840)
- Norberto Ramírez, Acting Head of State (1840–1841)
- Juan Lindo, Provisional Head of State (1841)
- Juan Lindo, Provisional President (1841)
- Pedro José Arce, Acting President (1841)
- Juan Lindo, President (1841–1842)
- José Escolástico Marín, Acting President (1842)
- Juan José Guzmán, President (1842)
- Dionisio Villacorta, Acting President (1842)
- José Escolástico Marín, Acting President (1842)
- Juan José Guzmán, President (1842–1843)
- Pedro José Arce, Acting President (1843)
- Juan José Guzmán, President (1843–1844)
- Fermín Palacios, Acting President (1844)
- Francisco Malespín, President (1844)
- Joaquín Eufrasio Guzmán, Acting President (1844)
- Francisco Malespín, President (1844)
- Joaquín Eufrasio Guzmán, Acting President (1844–1845)
- Fermín Palacios, Acting President (1845)
- Joaquín Eufrasio Guzmán, Acting President (1845–1846)
- Fermín Palacios, Acting President (1846)
- Eugenio Aguilar, President (1846)
- Fermín Palacios, Acting President (1846)
- Eugenio Aguilar, President (1846–1848)
- Tomás Medina, Acting President (1848)
- José Félix Quirós, Acting President (1848)
- Doroteo Vasconcelos, President (1848–1850)
- Ramón Rodríguez, Acting President (1850)
- José Félix Quirós, Acting President (1850)
- Doroteo Vasconcelos, President (1850–1851)

Guatemala

- Captaincy General of Guatemala (complete list) –

Spanish Colony, 1609–1821
For details see Spain in southwest Europe

- Federal Republic of Central America (complete list) –

- Gabino Gaínza, Chief Political Officer (1821–1822)
- Vicente Filisola, Chief Political Officer (1823)
- Pedro Molina Mazariegos, Antonio Rivera Cabezas, Juan Vicente Villacorta Díaz, First Triumvirate (1823)
- José Santiago Milla Pineda Arriaga, Triumvir (1823–1824)
- Juan Vicente Villacorta Díaz, Triumvir (1823–1824)
- Tomas O'Horan, Triumvir (1823–1825)
- José Cecilio del Valle, Triumvir (1824–1825)
- Manuel José Arce, Triumvir (1824)
- José Manuel de la Cerda y Aguilar, Triumvir (1824–1825)
- Manuel José Arce, President (1825–1829)
- Mariano Beltranena y Llano, Interim President (1829)
- José Francisco Barrundia, Interim President (1829–1830)
- Francisco Morazán, President (1830–1834, 1835–1839)
- José Gregorio Salazar, Interim President (1834–1835)
- Diego Vigil Cocaña, Interim President (1839–1840)

- Los Altos (es:complete list) –

- Marcelo Molina, President (1838–1840)
- Fernando Antonio Davila, President (1848)
- José Velazco, President (1848)
- Rafael de la Torre, President (1848)
- Agustín Guzmán, President (1848)
- Fernando Antonio Martínez, President (1848)

- Republic of Guatemala (complete list) –

- Mariano Rivera Paz, Head of State (1839–1842)
- José Venancio López Requena, Acting Head of State (1842)
- Mariano Rivera Paz, Head of State (1842–1844)
- Rafael Carrera, Head of State (1844–1847)
- Rafael Carrera, President (1847–1848)
- Juan Antonio Martínez, Acting President (1848)
- José Bernardo Escobar, Acting President (1848–1849)
- Mariano Peredes, Acting President (1849–1851)

Honduras

- Honduras (complete list) –

- Juan Francisco de Molina, President (1839)
- Felipe Neri Medina, Acting President (1839)
- Juan José Alvarado, Acting President (1839)
- José María Guerrero, Acting President (1839)
- Mariano Garrigó, Acting President (1839)
- José María Bustillo, Acting President (1839)
- Council of Ministers, (1839)
- Francisco Zelaya y Ayes, Acting President (1839–1841)
- Francisco Ferrera, President (1841–1842)
- Council of Ministers, (1843)
- Francisco Ferrera, President (1843–1844)
- Council of Ministers, (1845)
- Coronado Chávez, President (1845–1847)
- Council of Ministers, (1847)
- Juan Lindo, President (1847–1852)

Nicaragua

- Miskito Coast (complete list) –

- George II Frederic, King (1776–1801)
- George Frederic Augustus I, King (1801–1824)
- Robert Charles Frederic, King (1824–1842)
- George Augustus Frederic II, King (1842–1865)

- Nicaragua (complete list) –

- José Núñez, Supreme Director (1838–1839)
- Evaristo Rocha, Acting Supreme Director (1839)
- Patricio Rivas, Acting Supreme Director (1839)
- Joaquín del Cossío, Acting Supreme Director (1839)
- Hilario Ulloa, Acting Supreme Director (1839)
- Tomás Valladares, Acting Supreme Director (1839–1840)
- Patricio Rivas, Acting Supreme Director (1840–1841)
- Pablo Buitrago, Supreme Director (1841–1843)
- Juan de Dios Orozco, Acting Supreme Director (1843)
- Manuel Pérez, Supreme Director (1843–1844)
- Emiliano Madriz, Acting Supreme Director (1844–1845)
- Silvestre Selva, Acting Supreme Director, in dissidence (1844–1845)
- Manuel Antonio Blas Sáenz, Acting Supreme Director, in dissidence (1845)
- José León Sandoval, Supreme Director (1845–1847)
- Miguel Ramón Morales, Acting Supreme Director (1847)
- José María Guerrero de Arcos y Molina, Supreme Director (1847–1849)
- Toribio Terán, Acting Supreme Director (1849)
- Benito Rosales, Acting Supreme Director (1849)
- Norberto Ramírez Áreas, Supreme Director (1849–1851)

=== Americas: North ===
Canada

- Newfoundland Colony (complete list) –

British colony, 1610–1907

- Upper Canada (complete list) –

British colony, 1791–1841

- Lower Canada (complete list) –

British colony, 1791–1841

- Province of Canada (complete list) –

British colony, 1841–1867
For details see the United Kingdom under British Isles, Europe

Mexico

- Viceroyalty of New Spain (complete list) –

Spanish Colony, 1521–1821
For details see Spain in southwest Europe

- First Mexican Empire (complete list) –

- First Regency: Agustín de Iturbide, Juan O'Donojú, Antonio Pérez Martínez, Manuel de la Barcéna, José Isidro Yañez, Manuel Velázquez de León (1821–1822)
- Second Regency: Agustín de Iturbide, José Isidro Yañez, Miguel Valentín, Manuel de Heras, Nicolás Bravo (1822)
- Agustín I, Emperor (1822–1823)

- Provisional Government of Mexico (1823–24) (complete list) –

- Nicolás Bravo, Guadalupe Victoria, Pedro Celestino Negrete, Mariano Michelena, Miguel Domínguez, Vicente Guerrero, Members (1823–1824)

- First Mexican Republic (complete list) –

- Guadalupe Victoria, President (1824–1829)
- Vicente Guerrero, President (1829)
- José María Bocanegra, President (1829)
- Pedro Vélez, President (1829)
- Anastasio Bustamante, President (1830–1832)
- Melchor Múzquiz, President (1832)
- Manuel Gómez Pedraza, President (1832–1833)
- Valentín Gómez Farías, President (1833)
- Santa Anna, President (1833)
- Valentín Gómez Farías, President (1833)
- Santa Anna, President (1833)
- Valentín Gómez Farías, President (1833)
- Santa Anna, President (1833)
- Valentín Gómez Farías, President (1833–1834)
- Santa Anna, President (1834–1835)
- Miguel Barragán, President (1835)

- Centralist Republic of Mexico (complete list) –

- Miguel Barragán, President (1835–1836)
- José Justo Corro, President (1836–1837)
- Anastasio Bustamante, President (1837–1839)
- Santa Anna, Interim President (1839)
- Nicolás Bravo, President (1839)
- Anastasio Bustamante, President (1839–1841)
- Francisco Javier Echeverría, President (1841)
- Santa Anna, Provisional President (1841–1842)
- Nicolás Bravo, President (1842–1843)
- Santa Anna, Provisional President (1843)
- Valentín Canalizo, President (1843–1844)
- Santa Anna, Provisional President (1844)
- José Joaquín de Herrera, President (1844)
- Valentín Canalizo, President (1844)
- José Joaquín de Herrera, President (1844–1845)
- Mariano Paredes, President (1845)
- Nicolás Bravo, President (1846)
- José Mariano Salas, President (1846)

- Republic of Yucatán (complete list) –

- Santiago Méndez, President (1840–1841)
- Miguel Barbachano, President (1841–1842)
- Santiago Méndez, President (1842)
- Miguel Barbachano, President (1842–1843)
- Santiago Méndez, President (1843–1844)
- Miguel Barbachano, President (1844)
- José Tiburcio López Constante, President (1844–1846)
- Miguel Barbachano, President (1846–1847)
- Domingo Barret, President (1847)
- Santiago Méndez, President (1847)
- Miguel Barbachano, President (1847–1848)

- Second Federal Republic of Mexico (complete list) –

- José Mariano Salas, President (1846)
- Valentín Gómez Farías, President (1846–1847)
- Santa Anna, Interim President (1847)
- Pedro María de Anaya, President (1847)
- Santa Anna, Interim President (1847)
- Manuel de la Peña y Peña, President (1847)
- Pedro María de Anaya, President (1847–1848)
- Manuel de la Peña y Peña, President (1848)
- José Joaquín de Herrera, President (1848–1851)

United States

- United States (complete list) –

- John Adams, President (1797–1801)
- Thomas Jefferson, President (1801–1809)
- James Madison, President (1809–1817)
- James Monroe, President (1817–1825)
- John Quincy Adams, President (1825–1829)
- Andrew Jackson, President (1829–1837)
- Martin Van Buren, President (1837–1841)
- William Henry Harrison, President (1841)
- John Tyler, President (1841–1845)
- James K. Polk, President (1845–1849)
- Zachary Taylor, President (1849–1850)
- Millard Fillmore, President (1850–1853)

- California Republic –

- William B. Ide, Commander (1846)

- Cherokee Nation (complete list) –

- Little Turkey, First Beloved Man (1788–1794), Principal Chief (1794–1801)
- Black Fox, Principal Chief (1801–1811)
- Pathkiller, Principal Chief (1811–1828)
- Big Tiger, dissident Chief (1824–1828)
- Charles R. Hicks, Principal Chief (1827)
- William Hicks, Principal Chief (1827–1828)
- John Ross, Principal Chief (1828–1866)

- Republic of Indian Stream –

- Luther Parker, Justice of the Peace (1832−1835)

- State of Muskogee –

- William Augustus Bowles, Director General (1799–1803)

- Republic of the Rio Grande –

- Jesús de Cárdenas, President (1840)

- Republic of Texas (complete list) –

- David G. Burnet, interim President (1836)
- Sam Houston, President (1836−1838, 1841−1844)
- Mirabeau B. Lamar, President (1838–1841)
- Anson Jones, President (1844−1846)

- Republic of West Florida –

- Fulwar Skipwith, Governor (1810)

=== Americas: South ===
Argentina

- Viceroyalty of the Río de la Plata (complete list) –

Spanish Colony, 1776–1814
For details see Spain in southwest Europe

- United Provinces of the Río de la Plata (complete list) –

- Primera Junta (1810)
- Junta Grande (1810−1811)
- Feliciano Chiclana, Juan José Paso, Manuel de Sarratea, First Triumvirate (1811−1812), Juan Martín de Pueyrredón, replacement for Paso (1812)
- Juan José Paso, Nicolás Rodríguez Peña, Antonio Álvarez Jonte, Second Triumvirate (1812−1814)
- Gervasio Antonio de Posadas, Supreme Director (1814–1815)
- Carlos María de Alvear, Supreme Director (1815)
- Juan José Viamonte, Supreme Director (1815)
- José de San Martín, Matías de Irigoyen, Manuel de Sarratea, Third Triumvirate (1815)
- José Rondeau, Supreme Director (1815)
- Ignacio Álvarez Thomas, Acting Director (1815–1816)
- Antonio González de Balcarce, Supreme Director (1816)
- Juan Martín de Pueyrredón, Supreme Director (1816–1819)
- José Rondeau, Supreme Director (1819–1820)
- Juan Pedro Aguirre, Interim (1820)
- Bernardino Rivadavia, President (1826−1827)
- Vicente López y Planes, interim president (1827)
- Manuel Dorrego, governor managing international relations (1827–1828)
- Juan Lavalle, interim governor managing international relations (1828–1829)
- Juan José Viamonte, governor managing international relations (1829)
- Juan Manuel de Rosas, governor managing international relations (1829–1831)

- Republic of Entre Ríos –

- Francisco Ramírez, Supreme Chief (1820–1821)

- Argentine Confederation (complete list) –

- Juan Manuel de Rosas, Governor of Buenos Aires Province (1829–1832, 1835–1852)
- Juan Ramón Balcarce, Governor of Buenos Aires Province (1832–1833)
- Juan José Viamonte, Governor of Buenos Aires Province (1832–1833)
- Manuel Vicente Maza, Governor of Buenos Aires Province (1834–1835)

Bolivia

- Republic of Bolivia (complete list) –

- Simón Bolívar, Liberator of Bolivia (1825)
- Antonio José de Sucre, Liberator of Bolivia (1825–1826), President (1826–1828)
- José María Pérez de Urdininea, President (1828)
- José Miguel de Velasco Franco, Acting President (1828)
- Pedro Blanco Soto, Provisional President (1828–1829)
- José Miguel de Velasco Franco, Acting President (1829)
- Andrés de Santa Cruz

- Provisional President (1829–1831), President (1831–1839)
- Supreme Protector of the Peru–Bolivian Confederation (1836–1839)

- José Miguel de Velasco Franco, Provisional Supreme Chief (1839), Provisional President (1839–1840), President (1840–1841)
- Sebastián Ágreda, Provisional Chief (1841)
- Mariano Calvo, Acting President (1841)
- José Ballivián, Provisional President (1841–1844), President (1844–1847)
- Eusebio Guilarte Vera, Interim President (1847–1848)
- José Miguel de Velasco Franco, Provisional President (1848)
- Manuel Isidoro Belzu, Provisional President (1848–1850), President (1850–1855)

Brazil

- Colonial Brazil (complete list) –

Portuguese colony, 1500/1534–1808
For details see the Kingdom of Portugal under Southwest Europe

- Kingdom of Brazil (complete list) –

- Maria I, Queen (1815–1816)
- John VI, King (1816–1822)

- Empire of Brazil (complete list) –

- Pedro I, Emperor (1822–1831)
- Pedro II, Emperor (1831–1889)

Chile

- Captaincy General of Chile (complete list) –

Spanish Colony, 1541–1818
For details see Spain in southwest Europe

- Kingdom of Chile (complete list) –

First Government Junta
- Mateo de Toro y Zambrano, President (1810–1811)
- Juan Martínez de Rozas, Interim President (1811)
- Fernando Márquez de la Plata, President (1811)
First National Congress
- Juan Antonio Ovalle, President (1811)
- Martín Calvo Encalada, President (1811), President of the Provisional Executive Authority (1811)
- Juan Enrique Rosales, President of the Executive Court (1811)
Provisional Government Junta
- José Miguel Carrera, President (1811), of the Provisional Supreme Authority (1811–1812), (1812)
- José Santiago Portales, President (1812)
- Pedro José Prado Jaraquemada, President (1812)
- José Miguel Carrera, President (1812–1813)
- Juan José Carrera, President (1813)
Superior Governmental Junta
- Francisco Antonio Pérez, President (1813)
- José Miguel Infante, President (1813–1814)
- Agustín Eyzaguirre, President (1814)
Supreme Director of Chile
- Antonio José de Irisarri, Supreme Director (1814)
- Francisco de la Lastra, Supreme Director (1814)
- José Miguel Carrera, Supreme Director (1814)

- Captaincy General of Chile: Reconquest of Chile (complete list) –

Spanish Colony, 1541–1818
For details see Spain in southwest Europe

- Estado de Chile (complete list) –

- Bernardo O'Higgins, Supreme Director (1817–1823)
- Agustín Eyzaguirre, President of the Government Junta (1823)
- Ramón Freire, Interim Supreme Director (1823–1826)

- Conservative Republic of Chile (complete list) –

- Manuel Blanco Encalada, President (1826)
- Agustín Eyzaguirre, President (1827)
- Ramón Freire, President (1827)
- Francisco Antonio Pinto, President (1827–1829)
- José Tomás Ovalle, President (1829–1831)
- Fernando Errázuriz Aldunate, President (1831)
- José Joaquín Prieto, President (1831–1841)
- Manuel Bulnes, President (1841–1851)

Colombia

- Viceroyalty of New Granada (complete list) –

Spanish Colony, 1717–1723, 1739–1810, 1815–1821
For details see Spain in southwest Europe

- Supreme Governing Junta of Santa Fe de Bogotá (complete list) –

- Antonio José Amar y Borbón, President of the Supreme Governing Junta, viceregent of the King's Person (1810)
- José Miguel Pey, President of the Supreme Governing Junta, viceregent of the King's Person (1810-1811)

- Free and Independent State of Cundinamarca (complete list) –

- Jorge Tadeo Lozano, President of Cundinamarca, viceregent of the King's Person (1811)
- Antonio Nariño, President of Cundinamarca, viceregent of the King's Person (1811-1812)
- Manuel Benito de Castro, President of Cundinamarca, viceregent of the King's Person (1812)
- Antonio Nariño, President of Cundinamarca, viceregent of the King's Person (1812-1813)
- Antonio Nariño, President of Cundinamarca (1813-1814)
- Manuel de Bernardo Álvarez del Casal, President of Cundinamarca (1814)

- United Provinces of New Granada (complete list) –

- José Miguel Pey, President of the Supreme Governing Junta (1810–1811)

- Gran Colombia (complete list) –

- Simón Bolívar, President (1819–1830)
- Joaquín Mosquera, President (1830, 1831)
- Rafael Urdaneta, President (1830–1831)

- Republic of New Granada (complete list) –

- Francisco de Paula Santander, President (1832–1837)
- José Ignacio de Márquez, President (1837–1841)
- Pedro Alcántara Herrán, President (1841–1845)
- Tomás Cipriano de Mosquera, President (1845–1849)
- José Hilario López, President (1849–1853)

Ecuador

- Republic of Ecuador (complete list) –

- Juan José Flores, Jéfe Supremo (1830), President (1830–1834)
- Vicente Rocafuerte, Jéfe Supremo of Guayas (1834–1835), Jéfe Supremo Chief of the State (1835), President (1835–1839)
- Juan José Flores, President (1839–1843), President (1843–1845)
- José Joaquín de Olmedo, Head of Provisional Government (1845)
- Vicente Ramón Roca, President (1845–1849)
- Manuel de Ascásubi, Interim President (1849–1850)
- Diego Noboa, Interim President (1850–1851), President (1851)

Guyana

- British Guiana (complete list) –

British colony, 1814–1966
For details see the United Kingdom under British Isles, Europe

Paraguay

- Republic of Paraguay (complete list) –

- Junta, President of the Superior Governing Junta (1811)
- Fulgencio Yegros, President of the Superior Governing Junta (1811–1813)
- José Gaspar Rodríguez de Francia, Consul (1813–1814)
- Fulgencio Yegros, Consul (1814)
- José Gaspar Rodríguez de Francia, Consul (1814)
- José Gaspar Rodríguez de Francia, Supreme Dictator (1814–1840)
- Manuel Antonio Ortiz, President of the Provisional Junta (1840–1841)
- Juan José Medina, President of the Provisional Junta (1841)
- Mariano Roque Alonzo, President of the Provisional Junta (1841)
- Carlos Antonio López, Consul (1841–1844)
- Mariano Roque Alonzo, Consul (1841–1844)
- Carlos Antonio López, President (1844–1862)

Peru

- Viceroyalty of Peru (complete list) –

Spanish Colony, 1542–1824
For details see Spain in southwest Europe

- Protectorate of Peru (complete list) –

- José de San Martín, Protector of Peru (1821–1822)

- Republic of Peru (complete list) –

- Francisco Xavier de Luna Pizarro, Interim caretaker (1822)
- José La Mar, President of the Government Junta (1822–1823)
- José Bernardo de Tagle, President of the Government Junta (1823)
- José de la Riva Agüero, President (1823)
- Antonio José de Sucre, President (1823)
- José Bernardo de Tagle, Supreme Delegate (1823–1824)
- Simón Bolívar, President (1824–1827)
- Andrés de Santa Cruz, President of the Government Council (1827)
- Manuel Salazar y Baquíjano, Interim caretaker (1827)
- José de la Mar, President (1827–1829)
- Antonio Gutiérrez de la Fuente, President (1829)
- Agustín Gamarra, President (1829–1833)
- Francisco Xavier de Luna Pizarro, Interim caretaker (1833)
- Luis José de Orbegoso, President (1833, 1834–1835, 1836)
- Pedro Pablo Bermúdez, Provisional Supreme Ruler (1833–1834)
- Felipe Santiago Salaverry, Supreme Legislator (1835–1836)

- Peru–Bolivian Confederation –

- Andrés de Santa Cruz, Supreme Protector (1836–1839)

- Republic of Peru (complete list) –

- Agustín Gamarra, President (1838–1841)
- Manuel Menéndez, President of the Government Council (1841–1842)
- Juan Crisóstomo Torrico, President (1842)
- Juan Francisco de Vidal, (1842–1843)
- Justo Figuerola, President (1843)
- Manuel Ignacio de Vivanco, President (1843–1844)
- Domingo Nieto, President of the Government Junta – Grand Marshal of Peru (1843–1844)
- Ramón Castilla, President (1844)
- Domingo Elías, President (1844)
- Manuel Menéndez, President of the Government Council (1844)
- Justo Figuerola, President (1844)
- Manuel Menéndez, President of the Government Council (1844–1845)
- Ramón Castilla, President (1845–1851)

Suriname

- Dutch Surinam (complete list) –

Dutch colony 1667–1954
For details see the Netherlands under western Europe

Uruguay

- Liga Federal –

- José Gervasio Artigas, Protector (1815–1820)

- Oriental Republic of Uruguay (complete list) –

- Fructuoso Rivera, President (1830–1834)
- Carlos Anaya, Acting (1834–1835)
- Manuel Oribe, President (1835–1838)
- Gabriel Antonio Pereira, Acting (1838–1839)
- Fructuoso Rivera, President (1839–1843)
- Manuel Oribe, Disputed with Joaquín Suárez (1843–1851)

Venezuela

- First Republic of Venezuela –

- Francisco de Miranda, President (1811–1812)

- Second Republic of Venezuela –

- Simón Bolívar, President (1813–1814)

- Third Republic of Venezuela –

- Simón Bolívar, President (1817–1819)

- State of Venezuela (complete list) –

- José Antonio Páez, President (1830–1835)
- Andrés Narvarte, Interim President (1835)
- José María Vargas, President (1835)
- José María Carreño, Interim President (1835)
- José María Vargas, President (1835–1836)
- Andrés Narvarte, President (1836–1837)
- José María Carreño, Interim President (1837)
- Carlos Soublette, President (1837–1839)
- José Antonio Páez, President (1839–1843)
- Carlos Soublette, President (1843–1847)
- José Tadeo Monagas, President (1847–1851)

== Asia ==
=== Asia: Central ===
Kazakhstan

- Kazakh Khanate (complete list) –

- Kenesary, Khan (1841–1847)

- Junior zhuz (complete list) –

- Aishuaq, Khan (1797–1805)
- Shergazy, Khan (1805–1824)

- Bukey Horde (complete list) –

- Bokei, Khan (1801–1815)
- Shygai, Khan (1815–1823)
- Zhangir, Khan (1823–1845)

- Middle zhuz (complete list) –

- Uali, Khan (1781–1819)
- Gubaidolla, Khan (1819–1822)

Tibet

- Tibet under Qing rule (Qing emperors / Dalai Lamas) –

Manchu overlordship, 1720–1912
For details see the Qing dynasty under Eastern Asia

Uzbekistan

- Khanate of Kokand –

- Narbuta Bey, Khan (c.1764–1801)
- Alim, Khan (1800–1810)
- Muhammad Umar, Khan (1810–1822)
- Muhammad Ali, Khan (1822–1842)
- Shir Ali, Khan (1842–1845)
- Murad Beg, Khan (1845)
- Muhammad Khudayar, Khan (1845–1858)

- Khanate of Khiva (complete list) –

- Abu al-Ghazi IV, Khan (1790–1802)
- Abu al-Ghazi V ibn Gha'ib, Khan (1802–1804)
- Iltazar Inaq ibn Iwaz Inaq, Khan (1804–1806)
- Muhammad Rahim Bahadur I (1806–1825)
- Allah Quli Bahadur, Khan (1825–1842)
- Muhammad Rahim Quli, Khan (1842–1846)
- Abu al-Ghazi Muhammad Amin Bahadur, Khan (1846–1855)

- Emirate of Bukhara –

- Shah Murad bin Daniyal Bey, Amir (1785–1800)
- Haydar Tora bin Shah Murad, Amir (1800–1826)
- Hussain bin Haydar Tora, Amir (1826–1827)
- Umar bin Haydar Tora, Amir (1827)
- Nasr-Allah bin Haydar Tora, Amir (1827–1860)

=== Asia: East ===
China

- Qing dynasty (complete list) –

- Jiaqing, Emperor (1796–1820)
- Daoguang, Emperor (1820–1850)
- Xianfeng, Emperor (1850–1861)

Japan

- Tokugawa shogunate of Japan

- Emperors (complete list) –

- Kōkaku, Emperor (1780–1817)
- Ninkō, Emperor (1817–1846)
- Kōmei, Emperor (1846–1867)

- Shōgun (complete list) –

- Tokugawa Ienari, Shōgun (1787–1837)
- Tokugawa Ieyoshi, Shōgun (1837–1853)

- Ryukyu Kingdom: Second Shō dynasty –

Vassal state of Satsuma Domain, 1609–1872
- Shō On, King (1795–1802)
- Shō Sei, King (1802–1803)
- Shō Kō, King (1804–1828)
- Shō Iku, Regent (1828–1835), King (1835–1847)
- Shō Tai, King (1848–1879), Vassal state of the Empire of Japan, 1872–1879

Korea

- Joseon (complete list) –

- Sunjo, King (1800–1834)
- Heonjong, King (1834–1849)
- Cheoljong, King (1849-1864)

=== Asia: Southeast ===
Brunei

- Bruneian Empire (complete list) –

- Muhammad Tajuddin, Sultan (1778–1804, 1804–1807)
- Muhammad Jamalul Alam I, Sultan (1804)
- Muhammad Kanzul Alam, Sultan (1807–1826)
- Muhammad Alam, Sultan (1826–1828)
- Omar Ali Saifuddin II, Sultan (1828–1852)

Cambodia

- Kingdom of Cambodia: Middle Period (complete list) –

- Ang Chan, King (1806–1834)
- Ang Mey, King (1834–1841)
- Ang Duong, King (1841–1860)

- French Protectorate of Cambodia (complete list) –

Protectorate, 1863–1984, part of French Indochina 1887–1953

Indonesia

- Dutch East Indies (complete list) –

Dutch colony 1800–1811, 1816–1949
For details see the Netherlands under western Europe

Indonesia: Java

- Banten Sultanate (complete list) –

- Abdul Mofakhir Muhammad Aliuddin I, Sultan (1777–1802)
- Abdul Fath Muhammad Muhyuddin, Sultan (1802–1805)
- Abu Nazar Muhammad Isyak, Sultan (1805–1808)
- Abdul Mofakhir Muhammad Aliuddin II, Sultan (1808–1810)
- Muhammad Tsafiuddin, Sultan (1810–1811)
- Pangeran Ahmad, Regent (1811–1813)
- Muhammad Muhyuddin, Regent (1813–1816)
- Muhammad Rafiuddin, Sultan (1816–1832)

- Sultanate of Cirebon: Keraton Kasepuhan (complete list) –

- Sepuh VII Joharuddin, Sultan (1791–1816)
- Sepuh VIII Syamsuddin, Sultan (1816–1819)

- Sultanate of Cirebon: Kraton Kanoman (complete list) –

- Anom VI Muhammad Kamaruddin, Sultan (1807–1819)

- Sultanate of Cirebon: Kraton Kacirebonan (complete list) –

- Cirebon IV, Sultan (1808–1810)

- Sultanate of Cirebon: Panembahan line (complete list) –

- Cirebon IV, Sultan (1808–1810)

- Bangkalan –

- Cakraningrat VII, Sultan (1780–1815)
- Cakraningrat VIII, Sultan (1815–1847)
- Cakraningrat IX, Sultan (1847–1862)

- Sumenep –

- Tirtanegara, Sultan (1767–1811)
- Natadiningrat, Regent (1804–1810)
- Paku Nataningrat, Sultan (1811–1854)

- Pamekasan –

- Aria Cakraadiningrat II, R. Alsana, Sultan (1800–1804)
- Panembahan Mangku Adiningrat, Sultan (1804–1842)
- Pangeran Aria Suriokusumo, Sultan (1842–1853)

- Surakarta Sunanate (complete list) –

- Pakubuwono IV, Sultan (1788–1820)
- Pakubuwono V, Sultan (1820–1823)
- Pakubuwono VI, Sultan (1823–1830)
- Pakubuwono VII, Sultan (1830–1858)

- Yogyakarta Sultanate (complete list) –

- Hamengkubuwono II, Sultan (1792–1810, 1811–1812, 1826–1828)
- Hamengkubuwono III, Sultan (1810–1811, 1812–1814)
- Hamengkubuwono IV, Sultan (1814–1822)
- Hamengkubuwono V, Sultan (1822–1826, 1828–1855)

- Mangkunegaran (complete list) –

- Mangkunegara II, Sultan (1795–1835)
- Mangkunegara III, Sultan (1835–1853)

- Kalibawang –

- Mangkudiningrat, Sultan (1831)
- Pangeran Adipati Natapraja, Sultan (1831–1853)

- Nangulan –

- Pangeran Prabu Adiningrat, Sultan (1831–1833)

- Pakualaman (complete list) –

- Pakualam I, Sultan (1812–1829)
- Pakualam II, Sultan (1829–1858)

Indonesia: Sumatra

- Pagaruyung Kingdom –

- Muning Alamsyah Sultan (?–1825)
- Tangkal Alam Bagagar Sultan (1825–1849)

- Aceh Sultanate (complete list) –

- Alauddin Jauhar ul-Alam Syah, Sultan (1795–1815, 1819–1823)
- Syarif Saiful Alam Syah, Sultan (1815–1819)
- Alauddin Muhammad Da'ud Syah I, Sultan (1823–1838)
- Alauddin Sulaiman Ali Iskandar Syah, Sultan (1838–1857)

- Johor Sultanate (complete list) –

- Mahmud Shah III, Sultan (1761–1812)
- Abdul Rahman Muazzam Shah, Sultan (1812–1819)
- Hussein Shah, Sultan (1819–1835)
- Ali, Sultan (1835–1855)

- Sultanate of Deli (complete list) –

- Tuanku Panglima Gandar Wahid, Sultan (1761–1805)
- Amaluddin Mangendar, Sultan (1805–1850)
- Osman Perkasa Alam Shah, Sultan (1850–1858)

- Sultanate of Langkat –

- Kejuruan Hitam (Tuah Hitam), Raja (1750–1818)
- Ahmad bin Raja Indra Bungsu, Raja (1818–1840)
- Haji Musa al-Khalid al-Mahadiah Muazzam Shah, Sultan (1840–1893)

- Sultanate of Siak Sri Indrapura (complete list) –

- al-Sayyid al-Sharif Ali Abdul Jalil Syaifuddin Ba'alawi, Sultan (1784–1810)
- al-Sayyid al-Sharif Ibrahim Abdul Jalil Khaliluddin, Sultan (1810–1815)
- al-Sayyid al-Sharif Ismail Abdul Jalil Jalaluddin, Sultan (1815–1854)

- Sultanate of Serdang (complete list) –

- Al-Marhum Kacapuri, Raja (1782–1822)
- Al-Marhum Besar, Sultan (1822–1851)

- Riau-Lingga Sultanate

- Sultans –

- Mahmud Shah III, Sultan (1761–1812)
- Abdul Rahman Muazzam Shah, Sultan (1812–1832)
- Muhammad II Muazzam Shah, Sultan (1832–1842)
- Mahmud IV Muzaffar Shah, Sultan (1842–1858)

- Yang di-Pertuan Mudas –

- Ali, Yang di-Pertuan Muda (1784–1805)
- Ja'afar, Yang di-Pertuan Muda (1805–1831)
- Abdul Rahman, Yang di-Pertuan Muda (1831–1844)
- Ali bin Raja Jaafar, Yang di-Pertuan Muda (1844–1857)

- Jambi Sultanate –
  Ratu Seri Ingalaga, Sultan (1790–1812)
  Agung Seri Ingalaga, Sultan (1812–1833)
  Muhammad Fakhruddin, Sultan (1833–1841)
  Abdul Rahman Nazaruddin, Sultan (1841–1855)

Indonesia: Kalimantan (Borneo)

- Sultanate of Banjar (complete list) –

- Tahmidullah II/Sultan Nata, Sultan (1761–1801)
- Sulaiman al-Mutamidullah, Sultan (1801–1825)
- Adam Al-Watsiq Billah, Sultan (1825–1857)

- Sultanate of Bulungan –

- Aji Muhammad, Sultan (1777–1817)
- Muhammad Alimuddin Amirul Muminin Kahharuddin I, Sultan (1817–1861, 1866–1873)

- Kutai Kartanegara Sultanate –

- Aji Muhammad Salehudin, Sultan (?–1844)

- Lanfang Republic –

- Yan Sibo, President (1799–1804)
- Jiang Wubo, President (1804–1811)
- Song, President (1811–1823)
- Liu Taiji, President (1823–1838)
- Gu Liubo, President (1838–1842)
- Xie Guifang, President (1842–1843)
- Ye Tenghui, President (1843–1845)
- Liu Ganxing, President (1845–1848)

- Pontianak Sultanate (complete list) –

- Syarif Abdurrahman Alkadrie, Sultan (1771–1808)
- Syarif Kasim Alkadrie, Sultan (1808–1819)
- Syarif Osman Alkadrie, Sultan (1819–1855)

- Sultanate of Sambas (complete list) –

- Abu Bakar Taj ud-din I, Sultan (1793–1815)
- Muhammad 'Ali Shafi ud-din I, Sultan (1815–1828)
- Usman Kamal ud-din, Sultan (1828–1832)
- Umar Akam ud-din III, Sultan (1832–1846)
- Abu Bakar Taj ud-din II, Sultan (1846–1854)

- Sultanate of Sintang –

- Sri Paduka Muhammad Qamar ud-din ibni al-Marhum Sultan 'Abdu'l Rashid Muhammad Jamal ud-din, Sultan (1796–1851)

Indonesia: Sulawesi

- Sultanate of Gowa –

- I Manawari Karaeng Bontolangkasa, Sultan (1778–1810)
- I Mappatunru/I Mangikarang Karaeng Lembang Parang, Sultan (1816–1825)
- La Oddanriu Karaeng Katangka, Sultan (1825–1826)
- Abdul Kadir Moh Aidid, Sultan (1826–1893)

- Luwu –

- La Tenri Peppang, Datu (1778–1810)
- We Tenri Awaru, Datu (1810–1825)
- La Oddang Pero, Datu (1825–1854)

Indonesia: Lesser Sunda Islands

- Bima Sultanate (complete list) –

- Abdul Hamid Muhammad Syah, Sultan (1773–1817)
- Ismail Muhammad Syah, Sultan (1817–1854)

Indonesia: West Timor

- Amanatun (complete list) –

- Nai Taman, Raja (c.1832)

- Amarasi (complete list) –

- Don Rote Ruatefu, Raja (1774–1802)
- Kiri Lote, Raja (1803–pre-1832)
- Koroh Kefi, Raja (pre-1832–1853)

- Amabi (complete list) –

- Afu Balthazar, Raja (c.1797–pre-1824)
- Arnoldus Adriaan Karel Loti, Raja (pre-1824–1834)
- Osu II, Raja (1834–1859)

- Sonbai Besar (complete list) –

- Nai Sobe Sonbai II, Emperor (1808–1867))

- Sonbai Kecil (complete list) –

- Nube Bena/ Pieter Nisnoni I, Raja (1798–1820)
- Isu Baki, Raja (1820s)
- Ote Nuben Nisnoni, Raja (post-1832)
- Babkas Nube Nisnoni/ Pieter Nisnoni II, Raja (?–1839)
- Meis Babkas Nisnoni, Raja (1839–1860)

- Amanuban (complete list) –

- Tobani, Raja (1786–c.1807)
- Louis, Raja (c.1807–c.1824)
- Baki, Raja (c.1824–1862)

Indonesia: Maluku Islands

- Sultanate of Bacan (complete list) –

Dutch protectorate 1667–1942
- Kamarullah, Sultan (1797–1826)
- Muhammad Hayatuddin Kornabé, Sultan (1826–1861)

- Sultanate of Jailolo –

British occupation 1799–1802
- Muhammad Arif Bila, Sultan (1797–1806)
- Muhammad Asgar, Sultan (1808–1818)
- Muhammad Hajuddin Syah, Sultan (1818–1825)

- Sultanate of Tidore (complete list) –

Dutch protectorate 1657–1905
- Nuku, Muhammad al-Mabus Amiruddin Syah, Sultan (1797–1805)
- Zainal Abidin, Sultan (1805–1810)
- Muhammad Tahir, Sultan (1811–1821)
- Al-Mansur Sirajuddin, Sultan (1822–1856)

- Sultanate of Ternate (complete list) –

Dutch protectorate 1683–1915
- Muhammad Yasin, Sultan (1796–1801)
- Muhammad Ali, Sultan (1807–1821)
- Muhammad Sarmoli, Sultan (1821–1823)
- Muhammad Zain, Sultan (1823–1859)

Laos

- Kingdom of Vientiane (complete list) –

- Intharavong, King (1795–1805)
- Anouvong, King (1804–1828)

- Muang Phuan (complete list) –

- Somphou, King (1779–1803)
- Noi, King (1803–1831)
- Po, King (1848–1865), vassal to Siam and Vietnam

- Kingdom of Champasak (complete list) –

- Fay Na, King (1791–1811)
- No Muong, King (1811–1813)
- Manoi, King (1813–1819)
- Nyô, King (1819–1827)
Vassal to Siam (1829–1893)
- Huy, King (1828–1840)
- Nark, King (1841–1851)

- Kingdom of Luang Phrabang (complete list) –

- Anourouth, King (1791–1817)
- Mantha Tourath, Regent (1815–1817), King (1817–1836)
- Unkeo, Regent (1837–1838)
- Soukhaseum, King (1838–1851)

- French Protectorate of Luang Phrabang (complete list) –

Protectorate and constituent of French Indochina (1893–1953)

Malaysia

Peninsular Malaysia

- Kedah Sultanate (complete list) –

- Dziaddin Mukarram Shah II, Sultan, (1797–1803)
- Ahmad Tajuddin Halim Shah II, Sultan, (1803–1821)
- Siamese invasion of Kedah, Sultan, (1821–1842)
- Ahmad Tajuddin Halim Shah II, Sultan, (1842–1845)
- Zainal Rashid Al-Mu'adzam Shah I, Sultan, (1845–1854)

- Kelantan Sultanate: Patani dynasty (complete list) –

- Muhammad I, Sultan (1800–1835)
- Tengku Long Zainal Abidin, co-Sultan (1835–1836)
- Muhammad II, Sultan (1835–1886)

- Perak Sultanate: Siak dynasty (complete list) –

- Ahmaddin Shah, Sultan (1786–1806)
- Abdul Malik Mansur Shah, Sultan (1806–1825)
- Abdullah Mu’azzam Shah, Sultan (1825–1830)
- Shahabuddin Riayat Shah, Sultan (1830–1851)

- Terengganu Sultanate (complete list) –

- Zainal Abidin II, Sultan (1793–1808)
- Ahmad Shah I, Sultan (1808–1830)
- Abdul Rahman, Sultan (1830–1831)
- Mansur Shah II, Sultan (1831–1837)
- Muhammad Shah I, Sultan (1837–1839)
- Omar Riayat Shah, co-Sultan (1831), Sultan (1839–1876)

- Selangor Sultanate (complete list) –

- Ibrahim Shah, Sultan (1778–1826)
- Muhammad Shah, Sultan (1826–1857)

- Negeri Sembilan (complete list) –

- Hitam, Yamtuan (1795–1808)
- Lenggang, Yamtuan (1808–1824)
- Radin, Yamtuan (1824–1861)

- Perlis (complete list) –

- Syed Abu Bakar Harun Jamalullail, Penghulu (1797–1825)
- Syed Hussein Jamalullail, Penghulu (1825–1843), Raja (1843–1873)

- Federated Malay States (complete list) –

British protectorate, 1895–1942, 1945–1946

- Unfederated Malay States (complete list) –

British protectorate, 1826–1942, 1945–1946

- Straits Settlements (complete list) –

British protectorate, 1826–1942, 1945–1946
For details see the United Kingdom under British Isles, Europe

Malaysian Borneo

- Kingdom of Sarawak (complete list) –

- James Brooke, Rajah (1842–1868)

- Crown Colony of Labuan (complete list) –

British colony, 1848–1890, 1904–1906, 1907–1941, 1945–1946

- North Borneo (complete list) –

British colony, 1888–1941, 1945–1946; Crown colony, 1946–1963
For details see the United Kingdom under British Isles, Europe

Myanmar / Burma

- Konbaung dynasty (complete list) –

- Bodawpaya, King (1782–1819)
- Bagyidaw, King (1819–1837)
- Tharrawaddy, King (1837–1846)
- Pagan, King (1846–1853)

- British rule in Burma (complete list) –

British colony, 1824–1948
For details see the United Kingdom under British Isles, Europe

Philippines

- Sultanate of Sulu (complete list) –

- Sharap ud-Din, Sultan (1789–1808)
- Alim ud-Din III, Sultan (1808)
- Aliy ud-Din I, Sultan (1808–1821)
- Shakir ul-Lah, Sultan (1821–1823)
- Jamalul Kiram I, Sultan (1823–1844)
- Mohammad Pulalun Kiram, Sultan (1844–1862)

- Sultanate of Maguindanao (complete list) –

- Kibad Sahriyal, Sultan (c.1780–c.1805)
- Kawasa Anwar Ud-din, Sultan (c.1805–c.1830)
- Untong, Sultan (c.1830–c.1854)

- Spanish East Indies, part of the Captaincy General of the Philippines (complete list) –

Colony, 1565–1901
For details see Spain in southwest Europe

- First Philippine Republic

- Presidents (complete list) –
- Prime ministers (complete list) –

Singapore

- Colony of Singapore (complete list) –

British colony as part of the Straits Settlements, 1819–1867
For details see the United Kingdom under British Isles, Europe

Thailand

- Rattanakosin Kingdom of Siam (complete list) –

- Rama I, King (1782–1809)
- Rama II, King (1809–1824)
- Rama III, King (1824–1851)

- Kingdom of Chiang Mai (complete list) –

- Kawila, Prince of Lampang (1774–1782), King of Chiang Mai (1802–1813)
- Thammalangka or Dharmalanka, Prince (1813–1822)
- Khamfan, Prince (1823–1825)
- Phutthawong or Buddhavansa, Prince (1826–1846)
- Mahotaraprathet, King (1847–1854)

- Pattani Kingdom (complete list) –

First Kelantanese dynasty

- Datuk Pengkalan, ruler (1791–1808)

Second Kelantanese dynasty

- Phraya Long Muhammad Ibni Raja Muda Kelantan/Raja Kampong Laut Tuan Besar Long Ismail Ibni Raja Long Yunus, Sultan (1842–1856)

Timor

- Portuguese Timor (complete list) –

Colony, 1702–1975
For details see the Kingdom of Portugal under Southwest Europe

Vietnam

- Champa (complete list) –

- Po Chong Chan, King (1799–1822)

- Đại Việt

Tây Sơn dynasty (complete list) –
Nguyễn dynasty (complete list) –

- Việt Nam: Nguyễn dynasty (complete list) –

- Gia Long, Emperor of Đại Việt (1802–1804), of Việt Nam (1804–1820)
- Minh Mạng, Emperor (1820–1841)
- Thiệu Trị, Emperor (1841–1847)
- Tự Đức, Emperor (1847–1883)

- Cochinchina

French Colony, 1862–1949

- Annam Protectorate

French Protectorate, 1883–1945, 1945–1948

- Tonkin Protectorate

French Protectorate, 1884–1949

For details see France under western Europe

=== Asia: South ===
Afghanistan

- Durrani Empire (complete list) –

- Zaman Shah Durrani, Emir (1793–1801)
- Mahmud Shah Durrani, Emir (1801–1803, 1809–1818)
- Shah Shujah Durrani, Emir (1803–1809, 1839–1842)
- Ali Shah Durrani, Emir (1818–1819)
- Ayub Shah Durrani, Emir (1819–1823)

- Emirate of Afghanistan: Barakzai dynasty (complete list) –

- Dost Mohammad Khan, Emir (1826–1839, 1845–1863)
- Shah Shujah Durrani, Emir (1803–1809, 1839–1842)
- Akbar Khan, Emir (1842–1845)

=== Asia: West ===
Bahrain

- Hakims of Bahrain (complete list) –

- Sulman bin Ahmad Al Khalifa, Hakim (1796–1825)
- Abdullah bin Ahmad Al Khalifa, Hakim (1796–1843)
- Khalifah bin Sulman Al Khalifa, Hakim (1825–1834)
- Muhammad bin Khalifa Al Khalifa, Hakim (1834–1842)
- Muhammad bin Khalifa Al Khalifa, Hakim (1843–1868)

Cyprus

Iran

- Persia: Qajar dynasty (complete list) –

- Fath-Ali, Shah (1797–1834)
- Mohammad, Shah (1834–1848)
- Naser al-Din, Shah (1848–1896)

- Soran Emirate –

- Muhammad Pasha of Rawanduz, a.k.a. Muhammad Kor, Mir (1813–1838)

- Bohtan –

- Bedir Khan Beg, Mir (1821–1847)

Iraq

- Baban (complete list) –

- Ibrahim Pasha, Prince (1782–1803)
- Abdurrahman Pasha,, Prince (1803–1813)
- Mahmoud Pasha, Prince (1813–1834)
- Sulaiman Pasha, Prince (1834–1838)
- Ahmad Pasha, Prince (1838–1847)
- Abdollah Pasha, Prince (1847–1850)

Kuwait

- Sheikhdom of Kuwait (complete list) –

- Abdullah I, Sheikh (1762–1814)
- Jaber I, Sheikh (1814–1859)

Oman

- Omani Empire and Imamate of Oman: Al Busaidi dynasty (complete list) –

- Sultan bin Ahmad, Sultan (1792–1804)
- Salim bin Sultan, Sultan (1804–1806)
- Said bin Sultan, Sultan (1804–1856)

Qatar

- Qatar (complete list) –

- Mohammed bin Thani, Emir (1847–1876)

Saudi Arabia

- Emirate of Diriyah (complete list) –

- Abdul-Aziz bin Muhammad, Imam (1765–1803)
- Saud al-Kabeer, Imam (1803–1814)
- Abdullah bin Saud, Imam (1814–1818)

- Emirate of Nejd (complete list) –

- Turki bin Abdullah bin Muhammad, Imam (1819–1820, 1824–1834)
- Mishari bin Abdul Rahman, Imam (1834–1834, usurper)
- Faisal bin Turki bin Abdullah Al Saud, Imam (1834–1838, 1843–1865)
- Khalid bin Saud, Imam (1838–1841)
- Abdullah bin Thunayan, Imam (1841–1843)

- Emirate of Jabal Shammar –

- Abdullah bin Ali Al Rashid, Emir (1836–1848)
- Talal bin Abdullah Al Rashid, Emir (1848–1868)
- Mutaib bin Abdullah Al Rashid, Emir (1868–1869)
- Bandar bin Talal Al Rashid, Emir (1869)
- Muhammad bin Abdullah Al Rashid, Emir (1869–1897)
- Abdulaziz bin Mutaib Al Rashid, Emir (1897–1906)

Turkey

- Ottoman Empire

- Sultans –

- Selim III, Sultan (1789–1807)
- Mustafa IV, Sultan (1807–1808)
- Mahmud II, Sultan (1808–1839)
- Abdülmecid I, Sultan (1839–1861)

- Grand Viziers –

- Kör Yusuf Ziyaüddin Pasha, Grand Vizier (1798–1805)
- Hafiz Ismail Pasha, Grand Vizier (1805–1806)
- Ibrahim Hilmi Pasha, Grand Vizier (1806–1807)
- Çelebi Mustafa Pasha, Grand Vizier (1807–1808)
- Alemdar Mustafa Pasha, Grand Vizier (1808)
- Çavuşbaşı Memiş Pasha, Grand Vizier (1808–1809)
- Kör Yusuf Ziyaüddin Pasha, Grand Vizier (1809–1811)
- Laz Aziz Ahmed Pasha, Grand Vizier (1811–1812)
- Hurshid Pasha, Grand Vizier (1812–1815)
- Mehmed Emin Rauf Pasha, Grand Vizier (1815–1818)
- Dervish Mehmed Pasha, Grand Vizier (1818–1820)
- Seyyid Ali Pasha, Grand Vizier (1820–1821)
- Benderli Ali Pasha, Grand Vizier (1821)
- Hacı Salih Pasha, Grand Vizier (1821–1822)
- Deli Abdullah Pasha, Grand Vizier (1822–1823)
- Silahdar Ali Pasha, Grand Vizier (1823)
- Mehmed Said Galip Pasha, Grand Vizier (1823–1824)
- Mehmed Selim Pasha, Grand Vizier (1824–1828)
- Topal Izzet Mehmed Pasha, Grand Vizier (1828–1829)
- Reşid Mehmed Pasha, Grand Vizier (1829–1833)
- Mehmed Emin Rauf Pasha, Grand Vizier (1833–1839)
- Koca Hüsrev Mehmed Pasha, Grand Vizier (1839–1840)
- Mehmed Emin Rauf Pasha, Grand Vizier (1840–1841)
- Topal Izzet Mehmed Pasha, Grand Vizier (1841–1842)
- Mehmed Emin Rauf Pasha, Grand Vizier (1842–1846)
- Mustafa Reşid Pasha, Grand Vizier (1846–1848)
- Ibrahim Sarim Pasha, Grand Vizier (1848)
- Mustafa Reşid Pasha, Grand Vizier (1848–1852)

United Arab Emirates: Trucial States

- Sheikhdom of Abu Dhabi –

- Shakhbut bin Dhiyab Al Nahyan, ruler (1793–1816)
- Muhammad bin Shakhbut Al Nahyan, ruler (1816–1818)
- Tahnun bin Shakhbut Al Nahyan, ruler (1818–1833)
- Khalifa bin Shakhbut Al Nahyan, ruler (1833–1845)
- Saeed bin Tahnun Al Nahyan, ruler (1845–1855)

- Sheikhdom of Dubai –

- Obeid bin Said bin Rashid, ruler (1833–1836)
- Maktoum bin Butti bin Suhail, ruler (1833–1852)

- Sheikhdom of Sharjah –

- Rashid bin Matar Al Qasimi, ruler (1747–1777)
- Saqr bin Rashid Al Qasimi, ruler (1777–1803)
- Sultan bin Saqr Al Qasimi, ruler (1803–1866)

- Sheikhdom of Ajman –

- Rashid bin Humaid Al Nuaimi, ruler (1816–1838)
- Humaid bin Rashid Al Nuaimi, ruler (1838–1841)
- Abdelaziz bin Rashid Al Nuaimi, ruler (1841–1848)
- Humaid bin Rashid Al Nuaimi, ruler (1848–1864)

- Sheikhdom of Umm Al Quwain –

- Rashid bin Majid Al Mualla, ruler (1768–1820)
- Abdullah bin Rashid Al Mualla, ruler (1820–1853)

- Sheikhdom of Ras Al Khaimah –

- Saqr bin Rashid Al Qasimi, ruler (1777–1803)
- Sultan bin Saqr Al Qasimi, ruler (1803–1809, 1820–1866)
- Hasan bin `Ali Al Anezi (1809–1814)
- Hassan bin Rahma Al Qasimi, ruler (1814–1820)

Yemen

- Upper Aulaqi Sheikhdom (complete list) –

- Daha, Amir (18th century)
- Yaslam ibn Daha, Amir (?)
- `Ali ibn Yaslam, Amir (?)

- Upper Aulaqi Sultanate (complete list) –

- Munassar, Sultan (18th century)
- Farid ibn Munassar, Sultan (?)

- Emirate of Beihan (complete list) –

- Hussein, Amir (c.1800–1820)
- al Habieli, Amir (?)
- Thaifallah, Amir (?)

- Emirate of Dhala (complete list) –

- Shafa`ul al-`Amiri, Emir (early 19th century)
- Ahmad ibn Shafa`ul al-`Amiri, Emir (early 19th century)
- al-Hasan ibn Ahmad al-`Amiri, Emir (early 19th century)
- `Abd al-Hadi ibn al-Hasan al-`Amiri, Emir (early 19th century)
- Musa`id ibn al-Hasan al-`Amiri, Emir (c.1839)

- Kathiri (complete list) –

- Muhsin ibn Ahmad al-Kathir, Sultan (1800–1830)
- Ghalib ibn Muhsin al-Kathir, Sultan (1830–1880)

- Sultanate of Lahej –

- Ahmad I ibn 'Abd al-Karim al-'Abdali, Sultan (1791–1827)
- Muhsin ibn al-Fadl al-'Abdali, Sultan (1827–1839, 1839–1846, 1846–1847)
- Ahmad II ibn Muhsin al-'Abdali, Sultan (1839–1839, 1847–1849)
- Sayyid Isma'il ibn al-Hasan al-Husayni, Sultan (1846)
- 'Ali I ibn Muhsin al-'Abdali, Sultan (1849–1863)

- Mahra Sultanate –

- Sa`d ibn Taw`ari Ibn `Afrar al-Mahri, Sultan (c.1800–1820)
- Sultan ibn `Amr (on Suqutra), Sultan (c.1834)
- Ahmad ibn Sultan (at Qishn), Sultan (c.1834)
- `Amr ibn Sa`d ibn Taw`ari Afrar al-Mahri, Sultan (1835–1845)
- Taw`ari ibn `Ali Afrar al-Mahri, Sultan (1845–mid-19th century)

- Wahidi Balhaf of Ba´l Haf (complete list) –

- Ahmad ibn al-Hadi al-Wahidi, Sultan (1771–1810)
- `Abd Allah ibn Ahmad al-Wahidi, Sultan (1810–1830)

Split into four states

- Nasir ibn `Abd Allah, Sultan (c.1830)
- Ahmad ibn Nasir, Sultan (?)
- Muhsin ibn `Ali, Sultan (?)

- Wahidi Balhaf of `Azzan (complete list) –

- `Ali ibn Ahmad al-Wahidi, Sultan (1830–?)
- Muhsin ibn `Ali al-Wahidi, Sultan (1850–1870)

- Wahidi Haban (complete list) –

- al-Husayn ibn Ahmad al-Wahidi, Sultan (1830–1840)
- `Abd Allah ibn al-Husayn al-Wahidi, Sultan (1850–1870)

- Lower Yafa –

- Ali I ibn Ghalib al-Afifi, ruler (1800–1841)
- Ahmad ibn Ali al-Afifi, ruler (1841–1873, 1891–1893)

- Upper Yafa –

- Qahtan ibn `Umar ibn Salih Al Harhara, Sultan (c.1800–1810)
- `Umar ibn Qahtan ibn `Umar Al Harhara, Sultan (c.1810–1815)
- Qahtan ibn `Umar ibn Qahtan Al Harhara, Sultan (c.1815–1840)
- `Abd Allah ibn Nasir ibn Salih Al Harhara, Sultan (c.1840–1866)

- Yemeni Zaidi State (complete list) –

- al-Mansur Ali I, Imam (1775–1809)
- al-Mutawakkil Ahmad, Imam (1809–1816)
- al-Mahdi Abdallah, Imam (1816–1835)
- al-Mansur Ali II, Imam (1835–1837, 1844–1845)
- an-Nasir Abdallah, Imam (1837–1840)
- al-Hadi Muhammad, Imam (1840–1844)
- al-Mutawakkil Muhammad, Imam (1845–1849)

== Europe ==
=== Balkans ===
Croatia

- Kingdom of Croatia (Habsburg)

part of the Habsburg monarchy, also part of the Lands of the Hungarian Crown

- Kings (complete list) –

- Francis, King (1792–1835)
- Ferdinand V, King (1835–1848)
- Franz Joseph, King (1848–1916)

- Bans (complete list) –

- John ErdődyIvan Erdődy, Ban (1790–1806)
- Ignác Gyulay, Ban (1806–1831)
- Franjo Vlašić, Ban (1832–1840)
- Juraj Haulik, Acting ban (1840–1842)
- Franz Haller, Ban (1842–1845)
- Juraj Haulik, Acting ban (1845–1848)
- Josip Jelačić, Ban (1848–1859)

- Republic of Ragusa (complete list) –

- Frano Gozze, Rector (1801)
- Mato Ghetaldi, Martolica Cerva, Rector (1802)
- Vlaho Điva Bone, Rector (1803)
- Đivo Vlaha Bone, Miho Bona, Rector (1804)
- Mato Ghetaldi, Vlaho Điva Bone, Rector (1805)
- Đivo Pijerka Natali, Rector (1806)
- Sabo Giorgi, Rector (1808)

Greece

- First Hellenic Republic (complete list, complete list) –

- Provisional Executive Commission (1800–1801)
- Alexandros Mavrokordatos, President of the Executive (1822–1823)
- Petrobey Mavromichalis, President of the Executive (1823)
- Georgios Kountouriotis, President of the Executive (1823–1826)
- Andreas Zaimis, President of the Governmental Commission (1826–1827)
- Ioannis Kapodistrias, Governor (1827–1831)
- Augustinos Kapodistrias, Governor (1831–1832)
- Governing Councils (1832–1833)

- Kingdom of Greece

- Monarchs (complete list) –

- Otto, King (1832–1862)

- Prime ministers (complete list) –

- Spyridon Trikoupis, Prime minister (1833)
- Alexandros Mavrokordatos, Prime minister (1833–1834)
- Ioannis Kolettis, Prime minister (1834–1835)
- Josef Ludwig von Armansperg, Prime minister (1835–1837)
- Ignaz von Rudhart, Prime minister (1837)
- Otto of Greece, Prime minister (1837–1841)
- Alexandros Mavrokordatos, Prime minister (1841)
- Otto, Prime minister (1841–1843)
- Andreas Metaxas, Prime minister (1843–1844)
- Konstantinos Kanaris, Prime minister (1844)
- Alexandros Mavrokordatos, Prime minister (1844)
- Ioannis Kolettis, Prime minister (1844–1847)
- Kitsos Tzavelas, Prime minister (1847–1848)
- Georgios Kountouriotis, Prime minister (1848)
- Konstantinos Kanaris, Prime minister (1848–1849)
- Antonios Kriezis, Prime minister (1849–1854)

- Septinsular Republic –

- Spyridon Georgios Theotokis, Prince (1800–1803)
- Antonios Komoutos, Prince (1803)

- United States of the Ionian Islands (complete list) –

British protectorate, 1815–1864
For details see the United Kingdom under British Isles, Europe

Kosovo

Montenegro

- Prince-Bishopric of Montenegro (complete list) –

- Petar I, Prince-bishop (1782–1830)
- Petar II, Prince-bishop (1830–1851)

Serbia

- Revolutionary Serbia (complete list) –

- Karađorđe, Grand Vožd (1804–1813)
- Miloš Obrenović, Grand Vožd (1815–1817), Prince (1817–1839)

- Principality of Serbia

- Monarchs (complete list) –

- Miloš Obrenović, Prince (1817–1839)
- Milan Obrenović II, Prince (1839)
- Mihailo Obrenović III, Prince (1839–1842)
- Alexander Karađorđević, Prince (1842–1858)

- Heads of government (complete list) –

- Petar Nikolajević Moler, Prime minister (1815–1816)
- Jevrem Obrenović, Prime minister (1821–1826)
- Miloje Todorović, Prime minister (1826)
- Dimitrije Davidović, Prime minister (1826–1829)
- Koča Marković, Prime minister (1835–1836)
- Stefan Stefanović Tenka, Prime minister (1836–1839)
- Avram Petronijević, Prime minister (1839–1840)
- Paun Janković, Prime minister (1840)
- Đorđe Protić, Prime minister (1840–1842)
- Avram Petronijević, Prime minister (1842–1843)
- Aleksa Simić, Prime minister (1843–1844)
- Avram Petronijević, Prime minister (1844–1852)

Slovenia

- Illyrian Provinces (complete list) –

autonomous province of the First French Empire, 1809–1814

=== British Isles ===
- United Kingdom of Great Britain and Ireland

- Monarchs (complete list) –

- George III, King (1760–1820)
- George IV, Regent (1811–1820), King (1820–1830)
- William IV, King (1830–1837)
- Victoria, Queen (1837–1901)

- Prime ministers (complete list) –

- William Pitt the Younger, Prime minister (1783–1801)
- Henry Addington, Prime minister (1801–1804)
- William Pitt the Younger, Prime minister (1804–1806)
- William Grenville, Prime minister (1806–1807)
- William Cavendish-Bentinck, Prime minister (1807–1809)
- Spencer Perceval, Prime minister (1809–1812)
- Robert Jenkinson, Prime minister (1812–1827)
- George Canning, Prime minister (1827)
- F. J. Robinson, Prime minister (1827–1828)
- Arthur Wellesley, Prime minister (1828–1830)
- Charles Grey, Prime minister (1830–1834)
- William Lamb, Prime minister (1834)
- Arthur Wellesley, Prime minister (1834)
- Robert Peel, Prime minister (1834–1835)
- William Lamb, Prime minister (1835–1841)
- Robert Peel, Prime minister (1841–1846)
- John Russell, Prime minister (1846–1852)

=== Central Europe ===
Germany/ Prussia

- Holy Roman Empire, Kingdom of Germany (complete list, complete list) –

- Francis II, Emperor Elect, King (1792–1806)

German Empire

- Electorate of Brandenburg, Kingdom of Prussia (complete list, complete list) –

- Frederick William III, Elector (1797–1806), King (1797–1840)
- Frederick William IV, King (1840–1861)

- Confederation of the Rhine –

- confederation of French client states in Germany
- Napoleon, Protector of the Confederation of the Rhine (1806–1813)

Austria-Hungary

- Austria-Hungary: Archduchy/ Austrian Empire/ Kingdom of Hungary

- Archdukes/Emperors/ Kings (complete list, complete list) –

- Francis II, Archduke (1792–1804), Emperor (1804–1835), King (1792–1835)
- Ferdinand I, Emperor and King (1835–1848)
- Franz Joseph I, Emperor and King (1848–1916)

- Heads of government (complete list) –

- Franz Anton von Kolowrat-Liebsteinsky, Minister-President (1848)
- Karl Ludwig von Ficquelmont, Acting Minister-President (1848)
- Franz von Pillersdorf, Acting Minister-President (1848)
- Anton von Doblhoff-Dier, Minister-President (1848)
- Johann von Wessenberg-Ampringen, Minister-President (1848)
- Felix of Schwarzenberg, Minister-President (1848–1852)

- Habsburg monarchy (complete list) –

Habsburg-Lorraine monarchs ruled under numerous simultaneous titles

- Francis II, (1792–1835)
- Ferdinand I, (1835–1848)
- Francis Joseph I, (1848–1916)

Bohemia

- Kingdom of Bohemia (complete list) –

- Francis II, King (1792–1835)
- Ferdinand V, King (1835–1848)
- Francis Joseph, King (1848–1916)

Liechtenstein

- Liechtenstein (complete list) –

- Aloys I, Prince (1781–1805)
- Johann I Josef, Prince (1805–1836)
- Aloys II, Prince (1836–1858)
- Johann II, Prince (1858–1929)

Poland

- Duchy of Warsaw (complete list) –

client republic of France, 1807–1815
- Frederick Augustus I, Duke (1807–1815)

Switzerland

- Switzerland in the Napoleonic era (complete list) –

- Alois von Reding, First Landammann (1801–1802), Landammann (1802)
- Vinzenz Rüttimann, acting Landammann (1802)
- Johann Rudolf Dolder, Landammann (1802–1803)
- Aloys Reding von Biberegg, Landammann (1802)
- Louis d’Affry, Landammann (1803)
- Niklaus Rudolf von Wattenwyl, Landammann (1804)
- Peter Glutz-Ruchti, Landammann (1805)
- Andreas Merian, Landammann (1806)
- Hans von Reinhard, Landammann (1807)
- Vinzenz Rüttimann, Landammann (1808)
- Louis d’Affry, Landammann (1809)
- Niklaus Rudolf von Wattenwyl, Landammann (1810)
- Heinrich Daniel Balthasar Grimm von Wartenfels, Landammann (1811)
- Peter Burckhardt, Landammann (1812)
- Hans von Reinhard, Landammann (1813)

- Restored Swiss Confederacy: Tagsatzung (complete list) –

- Hans von Reinhard, President of the Swiss Diet (1814)
- Hans Konrad von Escher vom Luchs, President of the Swiss Diet (1814)
- Johann Konrad Finsler, President of the Swiss Diet (1814)
- David von Wyss II, President of the Swiss Diet (1814–1815)
- Hans von Reinhard, President of the Swiss Diet (1816)
- Niklaus Rudolf von Wattenwyl, President of the Swiss Diet (1817)
- Niklaus Friedrich von Mülinen, President of the Swiss Diet (1818)
- Josef Karl Xaver Leopold Leodegar Amrhyn, President of the Swiss Diet (1819)
- Vinzenz Rüttimann, President of the Swiss Diet (1820)
- David von Wyss II, President of the Swiss Diet (1821)
- Hans von Reinhard, President of the Swiss Diet (1822)
- Niklaus Rudolf von Wattenwyl, President of the Swiss Diet (1823)
- Niklaus Friedrich von Mülinen, President of the Swiss Diet (1824)
- Josef Karl Xaver Leopold Leodegar Amrhyn, President of the Swiss Diet (1825)
- Vinzenz Rüttimann, President of the Swiss Diet (1826)
- David von Wyss II, President of the Swiss Diet (1827)
- Hans von Reinhard, President of the Swiss Diet (1828)
- Niklaus Rudolf von Wattenwyl, President of the Swiss Diet (1829)
- Emanuel Friedrich von Fischer, President of the Swiss Diet (1830)
- Josef Karl Xaver Leopold Leodegar Amrhyn, President of the Swiss Diet (1831)
- Eduard Pfyffer von Altishoven, President of the Swiss Diet (1832)
- Johann Jakob Hess, President of the Swiss Diet (1833)
- Konrad Melchior Hirzel, President of the Swiss Diet (1834)
- Franz Karl von Tavel, President of the Swiss Diet (1835)
- Karl Friedrich Tscharner, President of the Swiss Diet (1836)
- Josef Karl Xaver Leopold Leodegar Amrhyn, President of the Swiss Diet (1837)
- Georg Jakob Kopp, President of the Swiss Diet (1838)
- Johann Jakob Hess, President of the Swiss Diet (1839)
- Johann Konrad von Muralt, President of the Swiss Diet (1840)
- Johann Karl Friedrich Neuhaus, President of the Swiss Diet (1841)
- Karl Friedrich Tscharner, President of the Swiss Diet (1842)
- Rudolf Rüttimann, President of the Swiss Diet (1843)
- Konstantin Siegwart-Müller, President of the Swiss Diet (1844)
- Johann Heinrich Emmanuel Mousson, President of the Swiss Diet (1845)
- Jonas Furrer, President of the Swiss Diet (1845)
- Johann Ulrich Zehnder, President of the Swiss Diet (1846)
- Alexander Ludwig Funk, President of the Swiss Diet (1847)
- Ulrich Ochsenbein, (1847)
- Johann Rudolf Schneider, President of the Swiss Diet (1847)
- Ulrich Ochsenbein, President of the Swiss Diet (1847–1848)
- Alexander Ludwig Funk, President of the Swiss Diet (1848)

- Switzerland (complete list) –

- Jonas Furrer, President of the Confederation (1848–1849)
- Henri Druey, President of the Confederation (1850)

==== Constituent states of the Confederation of the Rhine and German Confederation ====
These are leaders of constituent states from the German mediatisation in 1806 until the dissolution of the German Confederation in 1866. Leaders of constituent states within the Holy Roman Empire are excluded up to the time of German mediatisation (1801–1806).

- Anhalt-Bernburg (complete list) –

- Alexius Frederick Christian, Prince (1796–1807), Duke (1807–1834)
- Alexander Karl, Duke (1834–1863)

re-united to Anhalt

- Anhalt-Bernburg-Schaumburg-Hoym (complete list) –

- Victor II, Prince (1806–1812)
- Frederick, Prince (1812)

inherited by Anhalt-Bernburg

- Anhalt-Köthen (complete list) –

- Augustus Christian Frederick, Prince (1789–1806), Duke (1806–1812)
- Louis Augustus Karl Frederick Emil, Duke (1812–1818)
- Frederick Ferdinand, Duke (1818–1830)
- Henry V, Duke (1830–1847)

merged to Anhalt-Dessau

- Anhalt-Dessau (complete list) –

- Leopold III, Prince (1751–1758), Duke (1758–1817), Regent of Anhalt-Köthen (1812–1817)
- Leopold IV, Duke of Anhalt-Dessau (1817–1863), of Anhalt-Köthen (1847–1863), of Anhalt (1863–1871), Regent of Anhalt-Köthen (1817–1818)

- Duchy of Anhalt (complete list) –

- Leopold IV, Duke of Anhalt-Dessau (1817–1863), of Anhalt-Köthen (1847–1863), of Anhalt (1863–1871), Regent of Anhalt-Köthen (1817–1818)

- Arenberg (complete list) –

- Prosper Louis, Duke (1803–1810)

- Grand Duchy of Baden (complete list) –

- Charles Frederick, Margrave of Baden-Durlach (1746–1771), of Baden (1771–1803), Elector (1803–1806), Grand Duke (1806–1811)
- Charles, Grand Duke (1811–1818)
- Louis I, Grand Duke (1818–1830)
- Leopold, Grand Duke (1830–1852)

- Kingdom of Bavaria (complete list) –

- Maximillian IV, Elector (1799–1805), King (1805–1825)
- Ludwig I, King (1825–1848)
- Maximilian II, King (1848–1864)

- Bremen-Verden (complete list) –

- George III, Duke (1760–1807, 1813–1820)
- George IV, Regent (1811–1820), Duke (1820–1823)

- Duchy of Brunswick (complete list) –

- Frederick William, Prince of Brunswick-Wolfenbüttel (1806–1807), Duke of Brunswick (1813–1815)
- Charles II, Duke (1815–1830)
- William, Duke (1830–1884)

- Free City of Frankfurt (de:complete list) –

- Johann Wilhelm Metzler, Senior Mayor (1816–1817)
- Georg Steitz, Senior Mayor (1818)
- Johann Wilhelm Metzler, Senior Mayor (1819)
- Carl Wilhelm von Günderrode, Senior Mayor (1820)
- Johann Büchner, Senior Mayor (1821)
- Georg Friedrich von Guaita, Senior Mayor (1822)
- Johann Wilhelm Metzler, Senior Mayor (1823)
- Georg Friedrich von Guaita, Senior Mayor (1824)
- Johann Friedrich von Meyer, Senior Mayor (1825)
- Georg Friedrich von Guaita, Senior Mayor (1826)
- Friedrich Philipp Wilhelm von Malapert, Senior Mayor (1827)
- Ferdinand Maximilian Starck, Senior Mayor (1828)
- Johann Peter Hieronymus Hoch, Senior Mayor (1829)
- Friedrich Wilhelm Philipp Freiherr von Malapert, Senior Mayor (1830)
- Georg Friedrich von Guaita, Senior Mayor (1831)
- Johann Gerhard Christian Thomas, Senior Mayor (1832)
- Georg Friedrich von Guaita, Senior Mayor (1833)
- Ferdinand Maximilian Starck, Senior Mayor (1834)
- Johann Gerhard Christian Thomas, Senior Mayor (1835)
- Ferdinand Maximilian Starck, Senior Mayor (1836)
- Georg Friedrich von Guaita, Senior Mayor (1837)
- Johann Gerhard Christian Thomas, Senior Mayor (1838)
- Georg Friedrich von Guaita, Senior Mayor (1838)
- Johann Friedrich von Meyer, Senior Mayor (1839)
- Gottfried Scharff, Senior Mayor (1840)
- Friedrich Carl Hector Wilhelm von Günderrode, Senior Mayor (1841)
- Gottfried Scharff, Senior Mayor (1842)
- Johann Friedrich von Meyer, Senior Mayor (1843)
- Gottfried Scharff, Senior Mayor (1844)
- Carl Heinrich Georg von Heyden, Senior Mayor (1845)
- Gottfried Scharff, Senior Mayor (1846)
- Friedrich Carl Hector Wilhelm Freiherr von Günderrode, Senior Mayor (1847)
- Carl Heinrich Georg von Heyden, Senior Mayor (1848)
- Samuel Gottlieb Müller, Senior Mayor (1849)
- Carl Heinrich Georg von Heyden, Senior Mayor (1850)

- Kingdom of Hanover (complete list) –

- George III, Elector (1760–1806), King (1814–1820)
- George IV, Regent (1810–1820), King (1820–1830)
- William IV, King (1830–1837)
- Ernest Augustus, King (1837–1851)

- Grand Duchy of Hesse and by Rhine (complete list) –

- Louis I, Landgrave of Hesse-Darmstadt (1790–1806), Grand Duke of Hesse (1806–1830)
- Louis II, Grand Duke (1830–1848)
- Louis III, Grand Duke (1848–1877)

- Hesse-Homburg (complete list) –

- Frederick V, Landgrave (1751–1820)
- Frederick VI, Landgrave (1820–1829)
- Louis William, Landgrave (1829–1839)
- Philip, Landgrave (1839–1846)
- Gustav, Landgrave (1846–1848)
- Ferdinand, Landgrave (1848–1866)

- Electorate of Hesse (complete list) –

- William I, Landgrave of Hesse-Kassel (1785–1803), Elector of Hesse (1803–1807, 1813–1821)
- William II, Elector (1821–1847)
- Frederick William, Elector (1847–1866)

- Hesse-Philippsthal (complete list) –

- Louis, Landgrave (1813–1816)
- Ernest Constantine, Landgrave (1816–1849)
- Charles II, Landgrave (1849–1866)

- Hesse-Philippsthal-Barchfeld (complete list) –

- Charles, Landgrave (1803–1854)

- Hesse-Rotenburg (complete list) –

- Charles Emmanuel, Landgrave (1778–1812)
- Victor Amadeus, Landgrave (1812–1834)

- Hohenzollern-Hechingen (complete list) –

- Hermann, Prince (1798–1810)
- Frederick, Prince (1810–1838)
- Constantine, Prince (1838–1850)

- Hohenzollern-Sigmaringen (complete list) –

- Anton Aloys, Prince (1785–1831)
- Charles, Prince (1831–1848)
- Karl Anton, Prince (1848–1849)

- Duchy of Holstein

- Dukes (complete list) –

- Christian VII, Duke of Holstein-Glückstadt (1766–1773), of Holstein (1773–1808)
- Frederick VI, Duke (1808–1839)
- Christian VIII, Duke (1839–1848)
- Frederik VII, Duke (1848–1863)

- Statholders (complete list) –

- Charles of Hesse-Kassel, Statholder (1768–1836)
- Frederick of Hesse-Kassel, Statholder (1836–1842)
- Frederick of Schleswig-Holstein-Sonderburg-Augustenburg, Statholder (1842–1851)

- Isenburg-Büdingen-Birstein (complete list) –

- Karl, Prince (1803–1820)
- Wolfgang Ernest III, Prince (1820–1866)

- Principality of Lippe (complete list) –

- Leopold II, Prince (1802–1851)

- Duchy of Limburg (1839–1867) (complete list) –

- William I, Duke (1839–1840)
- William II, Duke (1840–1849)
- William III, Duke (1849–1866)

- Free City of Lübeck (complete list) –

- Nicolaus Jacob Keusch, Mayor (1817)
- Stephan Hinrich Behncke, Mayor (1818)
- Friedrich Nölting, Mayor (1826)
- Peter Hinrich Tesdorpf (Kaufmann, 1751), Mayor (1827)
- Georg David Richerz, Mayor (1810)
- Johann Matthaeus Tesdorpf, Mayor (1811)
- Anton Diedrich Gütschow, Mayor (1811–1813)
- Friedrich Adolph von Heintze, Mayor (1813)
- Christian Adolph Overbeck, Mayor (1814)
- Johann Matthaeus Tesdorpf, Mayor (1813–1824)
- Christian Heinrich Kindler, Mayor (1821)
- Adolph Hinrich Voeg, Mayor (1825)
- Christian Heinrich Kindler, Mayor (1825)
- Adolph Hinrich Voeg, Mayor (1826)
- Christian Heinrich Kindler, Mayor (1827)
- Peter Hinrich Tesdorpf (Kaufmann, 1751), Mayor (1827)
- Adolph Hinrich Voeg, Mayor (1828)
- Christian Heinrich Kindler, Mayor (1829)
- Adolph Hinrich Voeg, Mayor (1830)
- Christian Heinrich Kindler, Mayor (1831)
- Adolph Hinrich Voeg, Mayor (1832)
- Bernhard Heinrich Frister, Mayor (1833)
- Christian Heinrich Kindler, Mayor (1833)
- Johann Heinrich Kipp, Mayor (1833)
- Thomas Günther Wunderlich, Mayor (1833)
- Christian Heinrich Kindler, Mayor (1834–1835)
- Christian Nicolaus von Evers, Mayor (1836)
- Christian Heinrich Kindler, Mayor (1837)
- Christian Nicolaus von Evers, Mayor (1838)
- Christian Heinrich Kindler, Mayor (1839)
- Christian Nicolaus von Evers, Mayor (1840)
- Christian Heinrich Kindler, Mayor (1841)
- Christian Nicolaus von Evers, Mayor (1842)
- Christian Heinrich Kindler, Mayor (1843)
- Christian Nicolaus von Evers, Mayor (1844)
- Johann Joachim Friedrich Torkuhl, Mayor (1845)
- Bernhard Heinrich Frister, Mayor (1845–1846)
- Johann Joachim Friedrich Torkuhl, Mayor (1847–1848)
- Heinrich Brehmer, Mayor (1849–1850)

- Duchy/ Grand Duchy of Mecklenburg-Schwerin (complete list) –

- Frederick Francis I, Duke (1785–1815), Grand Duke (1815–1837)
- Paul Frederick, Grand Duke (1837–1842)
- Frederick Francis II, Grand Duke (1842–1883)

- Duchy/ Grand Duchy of Mecklenburg-Strelitz (complete list) –

- Charles II, Duke (1794–1815), Grand Duke (1815–1816)
- George I, Grand Duke (1816–1860)

- Duchy of Nassau (complete list) –

- Frederick Augustus, Prince of Nassau-Usingen (1803–1806), Duke of Nassau (1806–1816)
- William, Princely count of Nassau-Weilburg (1816), Duke of Nassau (1816–1839)
- Adolphe, Duke (1839–1866)

- Grand Duchy of Oldenburg (complete list) –

- Wilhelm I, Duke (1785–1810), Grand Duke (1815–1823)
- Peter I, Regent (1785–1823), Grand Duke (1823–1829)
- Augustus I, Grand Duke (1829–1853)

- Reuss-Ebersdorf (complete list) –

- Heinrich LI, Count (1779–1806), Prince (1806–1822)
- Heinrich LXXII, Prince of Reuss-Ebersdorf (1822–1848), of Reuss-Lobenstein (1824–1848)

- Reuss-Gera (complete list) –

- Heinrich XLII, Prince (1806–1818)
- Heinrich LXII, Prince (1818–1854)

- Reuss-Greiz (complete list) –

- Heinrich XIII, Prince (1800–1817)
- Heinrich XIX, Prince (1817–1836)
- Heinrich XX, Prince (1836–1859)

- Reuss-Lobenstein (complete list) –

- Heinrich LIV, Prince (1805–1824)
- Heinrich LXXII, Prince of Reuss-Ebersdorf (1822–1848), of Reuss-Lobenstein (1824–1848)

- Salm-Horstmar (complete list) –

- Frederick Charles Augustus, Count (1803–1813)
- Wilhelm Friedrich, Prince (1816–1865)

- Salm-Kyrburg (complete list) –

- Frederick IV, Prince (1794–1813)

- Salm-Reifferscheid-Hainsbach (complete list) –

- Francis Wenceslaus, Altgrave (1769–1811)

- Salm-Reifferscheid-Raitz (complete list) –

- Charles Joseph, Altgrave (1769–1790), Prince (1790–1811)

- Salm-Salm (complete list) –

- Konstantin Alexander, Prince (1778–1813)

- Saxe-Coburg-Saalfeld (complete list) –

- Ernest, Duke of Saxe-Coburg-Saalfeld (1806–1826), of Saxe-Coburg and Gotha (1826–1844)

- Saxe-Coburg and Gotha (complete list) –

- Ernest, Duke of Saxe-Coburg-Saalfeld (1806–1826), of Saxe-Coburg and Gotha (1826–1844)
- Ernest II, Duke (1844–1893)

- Saxe-Gotha-Altenburg (complete list) –

- Augustus, Duke (1804–1822)
- Frederick IV, Duke (1822–1825)

- Saxe-Altenburg, Saxe-Hildburghausen (complete list) –

- Frederick, Duke of Saxe-Hildburghausen (1780–1826), of Saxe-Altenburg (1826–1834)
- Joseph, Duke (1834–1848)
- Georg, Duke (1848–1853)

- Saxe-Meiningen (complete list) –

- Louise Eleonore of Hohenlohe-Langenburg, Regent (1803–1821)
- Bernhard II, Duke (1803–1866)

- Saxe-Weimar-Eisenach (complete list) –

- Karl August, Duke (1758–1815), Grand Duke (1815–1828)
- Charles Frederick, Grand Duke (1828–1853)

- Kingdom of Saxony (complete list) –

- Frederick Augustus the Just, Elector (1763–1806), King (1806–1827)
- Anthony, King (1827–1836)
- Frederick Augustus II, King (1836–1854)

- Schwarzburg-Rudolstadt (complete list) –

- Louis Frederick II, Prince (1793–1807)
- Caroline Louise of Hesse-Homburg, Regent (1807–1814)
- Frederick Günther, Prince (1807–1867)

- Schwarzburg-Sondershausen (complete list) –

- Günther Friedrich Carl I, Prince (1794–1835)
- Günther Friedrich Carl II, Prince (1835–1880)

- Duchy of Teschen (Cieszyn) (complete list) –

- Albert Casimir, Duke (1766–1822)
- Charles, Duke (1822–1847)
- Albert, Duke (1847–1849)

- Principality of Waldeck and Pyrmont (complete list) –

- Friedrich Karl August, Prince (1763–1812)
- George I, Prince (1812–1813)
- George II, Prince (1813–1845)
- George Victor, Prince (1845–1893)

- Kingdom of Württemberg (complete list) –

- Frederick I, Duke (1797–1803), Elector (1803–1805), King (1805–1816)
- William I, King (1816–1864)

- Ysenburg and Büdingen (complete list) –

- Ernest Casimir, Count (1801–1840), Prince (1840–1848)
- Ernest Casimir II, Prince (1848–1861)

=== Eastern Europe ===
Romania

- Moldavia (complete list) –

- Constantin Ipsilanti, Prince (1799–1801)
- Alexandru Suțu, Prince (1801–1802)
- Iordache Conta, Chancellor (1802)
- Scarlat Callimachi, Prince (1806, 1807–1810, 1812–1819)
- Russian occupation (1806–1812)
- Bessarabia is placed under Imperial Russian rule in 1812.
- Alexandru Hangerli, Prince (1807)
- Iordache Ruset-Roznovanu, Kaymakam (1807)
- Veniamin Costache, Kaymakam (1807–1812, 1821)
- Mihail Suțu, Prince (1819–1821)
- Stolnici
  Manu and Rizos-Nerulos
- Alexander Ypsilantis, military commander of Filiki Eteria occupation (1821)
- Stefan Bogoridi, Kaymakam (1821–1822)
- Ioan Sturdza, Prince (1822–1828)
- Fyodor Pahlen, Pyotr Zheltukhin, and Pavel Kiseleff, military commanders of Russian occupation (1828–1834)
- Organic Statute government (1832–1856)
- Mihail Sturdza, Prince (1834–1849)
- Grigore Alexandru Ghica, Prince (1849–1853, 1854–1856)

- Principality of Wallachia (complete list) –

- Alexandru Moruzi, Prince (1793–1796, 1799–1801)
- Alexandru Suțu, Prince (1802)
- Constantin Ypsilanti, Prince (1802–1806)
- Russian occupation (1806–1812)
- Ioan Gheorghe Caragea, Prince (1812–1818)
- Grigore Brâncoveanu, Kaymakam (1818)
- Alexandru Suțu, Prince (1818–1821)
- Grigore Brâncoveanu, Kaymakam (1821)
- Tudor Vladimirescu, Prince (1821)
- Scarlat Callimachi, Prince (1821)
- Grigore IV Ghica, Prince (1822–1828)
- Fyodor Pahlen, Pyotr Zheltukhin, and Pavel Kiseleff, military commanders (1828–1834)
- Organic Statute government (1832–1856)
- Alexandru II Ghica, Prince (1834–1842)
- Gheorghe Bibescu, Prince (1842–1848)
- Provisional Government (1848)
- Locotenența domnească, Regency of three (1848)
- Omar Pasha and Alexander von Lüders, military commanders (1848–1851)
- Constantin Cantacuzino, Kaymakam (1848)
- Barbu Știrbei, Prince (1848–1853, 1854–1856)

Russia

- Russian Empire

- Monarchs (complete list) –

- Paul, Emperor (1796–1801)
- Alexander I, Emperor (1801–1825)
- Nicholas I, Emperor (1825–1855)

- Heads of government (complete list) –

- Alexander Vorontsov, de facto head of government (1802–1804)
- Adam Jerzy Czartoryski, de facto head of government (1804–1806)
- Andrei Yakovlevich Budberg, de facto head of government (1806–1807)
- Nikolay Rumyantsev, de facto head of government (1807–1810), Chairman of the committee of ministers (1810–1812)
- Nikolai Saltykov, Chairman of the committee of ministers (1812–1816)
- Pyotr Lopukhin, Chairman of the committee of ministers (1816–1827)
- Viktor Kochubey, Chairman of the committee of ministers (1827–1834)
- Nikolay Novosiltsev, Chairman of the committee of ministers (1834–1838)
- Illarion Vasilchikov, Chairman of the committee of ministers (1838–1847)
- Vasily Levashov, Chairman of the committee of ministers (1847–1848)
- Alexander Chernyshyov, Chairman of the committee of ministers (1848–1856)

- Caucasian Imamate –

- Ghazi Muhammad, Imam (1828–1832)
- Hamzat Bek, Imam (1832–1834)
- Shamil, Imam (1834–1859)

Ukraine

- Kingdom of Galicia and Lodomeria (complete list) –

1795–1804, kingdom of the Habsburg monarchy

- Francis II, King (1792–1835)

1804–1918, crownland of the Austrian Empire

- Francis II, King (1792–1835)
- Ferdinand I, King (1835–1848)
- Francis Joseph I, King (1848–1916)

=== Nordic ===
Denmark

- Denmark–Norway (complete list / complete list) –

- Christian VII, King of Denmark and Norway (1766–1808)
- Frederick VI, King of Denmark (1808–1839), King of Norway (1808–1814)

- Denmark

- Monarchs (complete list) –

- Frederick VI, King (1808–1839)
- Christian VIII, King (1839–1848)
- Frederik VII, King (1848–1863)

- Prime ministers (complete list) –

- Adam Wilhelm Moltke, Prime minister (1848–1852)

- Duchy of Schleswig (complete list) –

- Christian VII, Duke (1766–1808)
- Frederick VI, Duke (1808–1839)
- Christian VIII, Duke (1839–1848)
- Frederik VII, Duke (1848–1863)

Finland

- Grand Duchy of Finland (complete list) –

- Alexander I, Grand Prince (1809–1825)
- Nicholas I, Grand Prince (1825–1855)

Norway

- Kingdom of Norway (1814) (complete list) –

- Christian VIII, Regent (1814), King (1814)

Sweden

- Gustavian era Sweden (complete list) –

- Gustav IV Adolf, King (1792–1809)
- Charles XIII, King of Sweden (1809–1818), King of Norway (1814–1818)

Sweden–Norway

- Sweden–Norway

- Monarchs (complete list, complete list) –

- Charles XIII, King of Sweden (1809–1818) King of Norway (1814–1818)
- Charles XIV/III John, King (1818–1844)
- Oscar I, King (1844–1859)

- Heads of government in Norway (complete list) –

First ministers in Christiania, Norway
- Frederik Gottschalk von Haxthausen, First Minister (1814)
- Marcus Gjøe Rosenkrantz, First Minister (1814–1815)
- Mathias Sommerhielm, First Minister (1815–1822)
- Jonas Collett, First Minister (1822–1836)
- Nicolai Johan Lohmann Krog, First Minister (1836–1855)

=== Southcentral Europe ===
Italy

- Italian Republic (Napoleonic) –

Sister republic of France, 1802–1805
- Napoleon, President (1802–1805)

- Kingdom of Italy (Napoleonic) –

Sister republic of France, 1805–1814
- Napoleon, King (1805–1814)

- Principality of Elba –

- Napoleon, Sovereign (1814–1815)

- Kingdom of Etruria (complete list) –

- Louis I, King (1801–1803)
- Maria Luisa, Regent (1803–1807)
- Charles Louis II, King (1803–1807)

- Ligurian Republic –

- Girolamo Luigi Durazzo, Doge (1797–1805)
- (complete list) –
client republic of France, 1797–1805
For details see France under western Europe

- Kingdom of Lombardy–Venetia (complete list) –

- Francis I, King (1815–1835)
- Ferdinand I, King (1835–1848)
- Francis Joseph I, King (1848–1866)

- Principality of Lucca and Piombino –

- client state of France
- Elisa Bonaparte, Princess (1805–1814)

- Duchy of Lucca –

- Maria Luisa, Duchess (1815–1824)
- Charles I, Duke (1824–1847)

- Duchy of Massa and Principality of Carrara (complete list) –

- Elisa Bonaparte, ruler (1806–1814)
- Maria Beatrice, Duchess and Princess (1790–1796, 1815–1829)

- Duchy of Modena (complete list) –

- Francesco IV, Duke (1814–1846)
- Francesco V, Duke (1846–1859)

- Kingdom of Naples (complete list) –

- Ferdinand IV, King (1799–1806)
- Joseph I, King (1806–1808)
- Joachim I the Dandy King, King (1808–1815)
- Ferdinand IV, King of Sicily (1759–1816), of Naples (1815–1816), of the Two Sicilies (1816–1825)

- Duchy of Parma (complete list) –

- Ferdinand, Duke (1765–1802)
- Cambacérès, Duke (1808–1814)
- Lebrun, Duke (1808–1814)
- Marie Louise, Duke (1814–1847)
- Charles Louis, Duke (1847–1849)
- Charles III, Duke (1849–1854)

- Roman Republic (1849) –

- Giuseppe Mazzini, Carlo Armellini, Aurelio Saffi, Triumvirate (1849)

- Kingdom of Sardinia, Duchy of Savoy (complete list, complete list) –

- Charles Emmanuel IV, King of Sardinia (1796–1802)
- Victor Emmanuel I, King of Sardinia (1802–1821), Duke of Savoy (1814–1821)
- Charles Felix, King of Sardinia, Duke of Savoy (1821–1831)
- Charles Albert, King of Sardinia, Duke of Savoy (1831–1849)
- Victor Emmanuel II, King of Sardinia, Duke of Savoy (1849–1861)

- Kingdom of Trinacria: Sicily (complete list) –

- Ferdinand IV, King of Sicily (1759–1816), of Naples (1815–1816), of the Two Sicilies (1816–1825)

- Kingdom of the Two Sicilies (complete list) –

- Ferdinand I, King of Sicily (1759–1816), of Naples (1815–1816), of the Two Sicilies (1816–1825)
- Francis I, King (1825–1830)
- Ferdinand II, King (1830–1859)

- Grand Duchy of Tuscany (complete list) –

- Ferdinando III, Grand Duke (1790–1801, 1814–1824)
- Leopoldo II, Grand Duke (1824–1849, 1849–1859)

Malta

- Malta Protectorate (complete list) –

British protectorate, 1800–1813

- Crown Colony of Malta (complete list) –

British colony, 1813–1964
For details see the United Kingdom under British Isles, Europe

- Gozo –

- Ferdinand, King (1798–1802)

San Marino

- San Marino

- Captains Regent (1700–1900) –

- Giuseppe Mercuri, Pier Vincenzo Giannini, Captains Regent (1800–1801)
- Giuliano Belluzzi, Marino Bertoni, Captains Regent (1801)
- Mariano Begni, Antonio Capicchioni, Captains Regent (1801–1802)
- Filippo Belluzzi, Marino Tassini, Captains Regent (1802)
- Annibale Gozi, Giovanni Filippi, Captains Regent (1802–1803)
- Camillo Bonelli, Livio Casali, Captains Regent (1803)
- Antonio Onofri, Marino Francesconi, Captains Regent (1803–1804)
- Marino Belluzzi, Matteo Martelli, Captains Regent (1804)
- Francesco Giannini, Giuseppe Righi, Captains Regent (1804–1805)
- Francesco Maria Belluzzi, Antonio Capicchioni, Captains Regent (1805)
- Mariano Begni, Giovanni Malpeli, Captains Regent (1805–1806)
- Giuseppe Mercuri, Marino Tassini, Captains Regent (1806)
- Alessandro Righi, Pietro Berti, Captains Regent (1806–1807)
- Antonio Onofri, Marino Francesconi, Captains Regent (1807)
- Camillo Bonelli, Livio Casali, Captains Regent (1807–1808)
- Marino Giangi, Matteo Martelli, Captains Regent (1808)
- Federico Gozi, Pier Antonio Damiani, Captains Regent (1808–1809)
- Francesco Giannini, Vincenzo Belzoppi, Captains Regent (1809)
- Mariano Begni, Giovanni Malpeli, Captains Regent (1809–1810)
- Lodovico Belluzzi, Maria Giuseppe Malpeli, Captains Regent (1810)
- Antonio Onofri, Marino Francesconi, Captains Regent (1810–1811)
- Francesco Maria Belluzzi, Marino Bertoni, Captains Regent (1811)
- Giuseppe Mercuri, Pier Vincenzo Giannini, Captains Regent (1811–1812)
- Camillo Bonelli, Livio Casali, Captains Regent (1812)
- Francesco Giannini, Pietro Zoli, Captains Regent (1812–1813)
- Marino Belluzzi, Pier Antonio Damiani, Captains Regent (1813)
- Mariano Begni, Giovanni Malpeli, Captains Regent (1813–1814)
- Federico Gozi, Andrea Albertini, Captains Regent (1814)
- Lodovico Belluzzi, Maria Giuseppe Malpeli, Captains Regent (1814–1815)
- Giuseppe Mercuri, Pier Vincenzo Giannini, Captains Regent (1815)
- Francesco Maria Belluzzi, Filippo Filippi, Captains Regent (1815–1816)
- Camillo Bonelli, Pietro Berti, Captains Regent (1816)
- Luigi Giannini, Matteo Martelli, Captains Regent (1816–1817)
- Antonio Onofri, Pietro Zoli, Captains Regent (1817)
- Federico Gozi, Vincenzo Belzoppi, Captains Regent (1817–1818)
- Giuliano Malpeli, Livio Casali, Captains Regent (1818)
- Mariano Begni, Giovanni Malpeli, Captains Regent (1818–1819)
- Giuseppe Mercuri, Andrea Albertini, Captains Regent (1819)
- Francesco Maria Belluzzi, Filippo Filippi, Captains Regent (1819–1820)
- Luigi Giannini, Matteo Martelli, Captains Regent (1820)
- Camillo Bonelli, Marino Berti, Captains Regent (1820–1821)
- Antonio Onofri, Pier Vincenzo Giannini, Captains Regent (1821)
- Giuliano Malpeli, Pietro Berti, Captains Regent (1821–1822)
- Federico Gozi, Francesco Guidi Giangi, Captains Regent (1822)
- Mariano Begni, Giovanni Malpeli, Captains Regent (1822–1823)
- Giuseppe Mercuri, Marino Lonfernini, Captains Regent (1823)
- Francesco Maria Belluzzi, Filippo Filippi, Captains Regent (1823–1824)
- Lodovico Belluzzi, Vincenzo Braschi, Captains Regent (1824)
- Luigi Giannini, Bartolomeo Bartolotti, Captains Regent (1824–1825)
- Raffaele Gozi, Pietro Berti, Captains Regent (1825)
- Camillo Bonelli, Pier Antonio Damiani, Captains Regent (1825–1826)
- Giambattista Onofri, Marino Berti, Captains Regent (1826)
- Giuliano Malpeli, Marino Lonfernini, Captains Regent (1826–1827)
- Mariano Begni, Giovanni Malpeli, Captains Regent (1827)
- Lodovico Belluzzi, Vincenzo Braschi, Captains Regent (1827–1828)
- Francesco Maria Belluzzi, Francesco Guidi Giangi, Captains Regent (1828)
- Luigi Giannini, Giacomo Antonio Tini, Captains Regent (1828–1829)
- Camillo Bonelli, Pietro Zoli, Captains Regent (1829)
- Giuseppe Mercuri, Filippo Filippi, Captains Regent (1829–1830)
- Giuliano Malpeli, Marino Lonfernini, Captains Regent (1830)
- Giambattista Onofri, Pier Antonio Damiani, Captains Regent (1830–1831)
- Lodovico Belluzzi, Biagio Martelli, Captains Regent (1831)
- Francesco Maria Belluzzi, Pier Matteo Berti, Captains Regent (1831–1832)
- Giovanni Benedetto Belluzzi, Bartolomeo Bartolotti, Captains Regent (1832)
- Mariano Begni, Giovanni Malpeli, Captains Regent (1832–1833)
- Giuseppe Mercuri, Filippo Filippi, Captains Regent (1833)
- Luigi Giannini, Vincenzo Braschi, Captains Regent (1833–1834)
- Lodovico Belluzzi, Francesco Guidi Giangi, Captains Regent (1834)
- Giuliano Malpeli, Pietro Tassini, Captains Regent (1834–1835)
- Francesco Maria Belluzzi/ Raffaele Gozi, Pietro Zoli, Captains Regent (1835)
- Giambattista Bonelli, Bartolomeo Bartolotti, Captains Regent (1835–1836)
- Giovanni Benedetto Belluzzi, Pier Antonio Damiani, Captains Regent (1836)
- Giuseppe Gozi, Pier Matteo Berti, Captains Regent (1836–1837)
- Filippo Belluzzi, Filippo Filippi, Captains Regent (1837)
- Giuseppe Mercuri, Marc' Antonio Tassini, Captains Regent (1837–1838)
- Girolamo Gozi, Francesco Guidi Giangi, Captains Regent (1838)
- Mariano Begni, Domenico Maria Belzoppi, Captains Regent (1838–1839)
- Giambattista Bonelli, Bartolomeo Bartolotti, Captains Regent (1839)
- Giuliano Malpeli, Biagio Martelli, Captains Regent (1839–1840)
- Giovanni Benedetto Belluzzi, Pietro Righi, Captains Regent (1840)
- Raffaele Gozi, Pietro Zoli, Captains Regent (1840–1841)
- Filippo Belluzzi, Filippo Filippi, Captains Regent (1841)
- Girolamo Gozi, Francesco Guidi Giangi, Captains Regent (1841–1842)
- Domenico Maria Belzoppi, Pier Matteo Berti, Captains Regent (1842)
- Giuseppe Gozi, Domenic' Antonio Bartolotti, Captains Regent (1842–1843)
- Giuliano Malpeli, Marino Malpeli, Captains Regent (1843)
- Lodovico Belluzzi, Biagio Martelli, Captains Regent (1843–1844)
- Giovanni Benedetto Belluzzi, Pietro Righi, Captains Regent (1844)
- Pietro Zoli, Marino Berti, Captains Regent (1844–1845)
- Giambattista Bonelli, Francesco Valli, Captains Regent (1845)
- Domenico Maria Belzoppi, Pier Matteo Berti, Captains Regent (1845–1846)
- Filippo Belluzzi, Filippo Filippi, Captains Regent (1846)
- Francesco Guidi Giangi, Costanzo Damiani, Captains Regent (1846–1847)
- Girolamo Gozi, Domenic' Antonio Bartolotti, Captains Regent (1847)
- Giuliano Malpeli, Biagio Martelli, Captains Regent (1847–1848)
- Giuseppe Gozi, Marino Malpeli, Captains Regent (1848)
- Giovanni Benedetto Belluzzi, Pietro Righi, Captains Regent (1848–1849)
- Domenico Maria Belzoppi, Pier Matteo Berti, Captains Regent (1849)
- Giambattista Braschi, Marino Lonfernini, Captains Regent (1849–1850)
- Vincenzo Angeli, Costanzo Damiani, Captains Regent (1850)
- Giambattista Bonelli, Marino Berti, Captains Regent (1850–1851)

Vatican City

- Papal States (complete list) –

- Pius VII, Pope (1800–1823)
- Leo XII, Pope (1823–1829)
- Pius VIII, Pope (1829–1830)
- Gregory XVI, Pope (1831–1846)
- Pius IX, Pope (1846–1878)

=== Southwestern Europe ===
Andorra

- Andorra

- Episcopal Co-Princes (complete list) –

- Francesc Antoni de la Dueña y Cisneros, Episcopal Co-Prince (1797–1816)
- Bernat Francés Caballero i Mathet, Episcopal Co-Prince (1817–1824)
- Bonifaci López i Pulido, Episcopal Co-Prince (1824–1827)
- Simó de Guardiola i Hortoneda, Episcopal Co-Prince (1827–1851)

- French Co-Princes (complete list) –

- Napoleon I, French Co-Prince (1806–1812, 1813–1814, 1815)
- Louis XVIII, French Co-Prince (1814–1815, 1815–1824)
- Napoleon II, French Co-Prince (1815)
- Charles X, French Co-Prince (1824–1830)
- Louis Philippe I, French Co-Prince (1830–1848)
- Napoleon III, French Co-Prince (1848–1870)

Portugal

- Kingdom of Portugal

- Monarchs (complete list) –

- Maria I, Queen (1777–1816)
- John VI, King (1816–1826)
- Pedro IV, King (1826)
- Maria II, Queen (1826–1828, 1834–1853)
- Miguel I, King (1828–1834)
- Ferdinand II, King (1837–1853)

- Prime ministers (complete list) –

- Pedro de Sousa Holstein, Prime minister (1834–1835)
- Vitório Maria de Sousa Coutinho, Prime minister (1835)
- João Carlos Saldanha de Oliveira e Daun, Prime minister (1835)
- José Jorge Loureiro, Prime minister (1835–1836)
- António Severim de Noronha, Prime minister (1836)
- José da Gama Carneiro e Sousa, Prime minister (1836)
- Bernardo de Sá Nogueira de Figueiredo, Prime minister (1836–1837)
- António Dias de Oliveira, Prime minister (1837)
- Bernardo de Sá Nogueira de Figueiredo, Prime minister (1837–1839)
- Rodrigo Pinto Pizarro, Prime minister (1839)
- José Travassos Valdez, Prime minister (1839–1841)
- Joaquim António de Aguiar, Prime minister (1841–1842)
- Pedro de Sousa Holstein, Prime minister (1842)
- António Bernardo da Costa Cabral, Prime minister (1842–1846)
- Pedro de Sousa Holstein, Prime minister (1846)
- João Carlos Saldanha de Oliveira e Daun, Prime minister (1846–1849)
- António Bernardo da Costa Cabral, Prime minister (1849–1851)

Spain

- Bourbon Spain (complete list) –

- Charles IV, King (1788–1808)
- Ferdinand VII, King (1808)

- Napoleonic Spain

- Monarchs (complete list) –

- Joseph Bonaparte, King (1808–1813)

- Prime ministers (complete list) –

- Mariano Luis de Urquijo, Prime minister (1808–1813)
- Juan O'Donoju O'Ryan, Prime minister (1813)
- Fernando de Laserna, Prime minister (1813)

- Kingdom of Spain (1810–1873) (complete list) –

- Ferdinand VII, King (1813–1833)
- Isabella II, Queen (1833–1868)

=== Western Europe ===
Belgium

- Belgium

- Monarchs (complete list) –

- Érasme-Louis Surlet de Chokier, Regent (1831)
- Leopold I, King (1831–1865)

- Prime ministers (complete list) –

- Étienne Constantin de Gerlache, Prime minister (1831)
- Joseph Lebeau, Prime minister (1831)
- Félix de Muelenaere, Prime minister (1831–1832)
- Albert Joseph Goblet d'Alviella, Prime minister (1832–1834)
- Barthélémy de Theux de Meylandt, Prime minister (1834–1840)
- Joseph Lebeau, Prime minister (1840–1841)
- Jean-Baptiste Nothomb, Prime minister (1841–1845)
- Sylvain Van de Weyer, Prime minister (1845–1846)
- Barthélémy de Theux de Meylandt, Prime minister (1846–1847)
- Charles Rogier, Prime minister (1847–1852)

France

- French First Republic (complete list) –

- Napoleon I, First Consul (1799–1804)

- First French Empire (complete list) –

- Napoleon I, Emperor (1804–1814, 1815)
- Napoleon II, Emperor (1815)

- Bourbon Restoration of France

- Monarchs (complete list) –

- Louis XVIII, King (1814–1815, 1815–1824)
- Charles X, King (1824–1830)

- Prime ministers (complete list) –

- Charles Maurice de Talleyrand-Périgord, Prime minister (1815)
- Armand Emmanuel de Vignerot du Plessis, Prime minister (1815–1818)
- Jean-Joseph, Marquis Dessolles, Prime minister (1818–1819)
- Élie, duc Decazes, Prime minister (1819–1820)
- Armand Emmanuel de Vignerot du Plessis, Prime minister (1820–1821)
- Jean-Baptiste de Villèle, Prime minister (1821–1828)
- Jean Baptiste Gay, vicomte de Martignac, Prime minister (1828–1829)
- Jules de Polignac, Prime minister (1829–1830)

- July Monarchy of France

- Monarchs (complete list) –

- Louis Philippe I, King (1830–1848)

- Prime ministers (complete list) –

- Victor de Broglie, Prime minister (1830)
- Jacques Laffitte, Prime minister (1830–1831)
- Casimir Pierre Périer, Prime minister (1831–1832)
- Jean-de-Dieu Soult, Prime minister (1832–1834)
- Étienne Maurice Gérard, Prime minister (1834)
- Hugues-Bernard Maret, Prime minister (1834)
- Édouard Mortier, Prime minister (1834–1835)
- Victor de Broglie, Prime minister (1835–1836)
- Adolphe Thiers, Prime minister (1836)
- Louis-Mathieu Molé, Prime minister (1836–1839)
- Jean-de-Dieu Soult, Prime minister (1839–1840)
- Adolphe Thiers, Prime minister (1840)
- Jean-de-Dieu Soult, Prime minister (1840–1847)
- François Guizot, Prime minister (1847–1848)
- Louis-Mathieu Molé, Prime minister (1848)

- French Second Republic

- Presidents (complete list) –

- Jacques-Charles Dupont de l'Eure, President of the provisional government (1848)
- Executive Commission: François Arago (President), Alphonse de Lamartine, Louis-Antoine Garnier-Pagès, Alexandre Auguste Ledru-Rollin, Pierre Marie de Saint-Georges (1848)
- Louis-Eugène Cavaignac, Chief of the Executive Power (1848)
- Louis-Napoléon Bonaparte, President (1848–1852)

- Prime ministers (complete list) –

- Jacques-Charles Dupont de l'Eure, Prime minister (1848)
- François Arago, Prime minister (1848)
- Louis-Eugène Cavaignac, Prime minister (1848)
- Odilon Barrot, Prime minister (1848–1849)
- Alphonse Henri, comte d'Hautpoul, Prime minister (1849–1851)

Luxembourg

- Luxembourg

- Monarchs (complete list) –

- William I, Grand Duke (1815–1840)
- William II, Grand Duke (1840–1849)
- William III, Grand Duke (1849–1890)

- Prime ministers (complete list) –

- Gaspard-Théodore-Ignace de la Fontaine, Prime minister (1848)
- Jean-Jacques Willmar, Prime minister (1848–1853)

Monaco

- Monaco (complete list) –

- Honoré IV, Prince (1814–1819)
- Honoré V, Prince (1819–1841)
- Florestan I, Prince (1841–1856)

Netherlands

- Batavian Republic –

- Uitvoerend Bewind (1798–1801)

- Kingdom of Holland (complete list) –

- Louis Bonaparte, King (1806–1810)
- Napoléon Louis Bonaparte, King (1810)

- Sovereign Principality/ United Kingdom of the Netherlands (complete list) –

- William I, Sovereign Prince (1813–1815), King (1815–1840)

- Kingdom of the Netherlands

- Monarchs (complete list) –

- William I, Sovereign Prince (1813–1815), King (1815–1840)
- William II, King (1840–1849)
- William III, King (1849–1890)

- Prime ministers (complete list) –

- Gerrit Schimmelpenninck, Prime minister (1848)
- Jacob de Kempenaer, Prime minister (1848–1849)
- Johan Rudolph Thorbecke, Prime minister (1849–1853)

=== Caucasus ===
Azerbaijan

- Baku Khanate (complete list) –

- Mirza Muhammad II, Khan (1797–1801)
- Husayn Quli, Khan (1801–1806)

- Ganja Khanate (complete list) –

- Javad, Khan (1786–1804)

- Nakhichevan Khanate (complete list) –

- Kalbali, Khan (1787–1823)
- Ehsan Kangarlu, Khan (1823–1828)
- Karim Kangarlu, Khan (1828–1834)

- Quba Khanate (complete list) –

- Shaykh Ali Agha, Khan (1791–1806)
- Husayn, Khan (1806–1816)

Georgia

- Principality of Abkhazia (complete list) –

- Keilash Ahmed–Bey, Prince (c.1780–1808)
- Aslan-Bey, Prince (1808–1810)
- Sefer Ali–Bey, Prince (1810–1821)
- Umar–Bey, Prince (1821–1822)
- Mikhail, Prince (1822–1864)

- Kingdom of Imereti (complete list) –

- Solomon II, King (1789–1790, 1792–1810)

- Kingdom of Kartli-Kakheti (complete list) –

- David Bagrationi, Regent (1800–1801)

Russia: Dagestan

- Avar Khanate –

- Umma, Khan (1774–1801)

- Gazikumukh Khanate (complete list) –

- Surkhay ibn Muhammad, Khan (1789–1820)
- Aslan ibn Shahmardan, Khan (1820–1836)
- Nutsal-Aga ibn Aslan, Khan (1836–1836)
- Muhammad-Mirza ibn Aslan, Khan (1836–1838)
- Ummu Kulsum-Beke, Khan (1838–1841)
- Abdurrahman ibn Umar, Khan (1841–1847)
- Aglar ibn Umar, Khan (1847–1859)

== Oceania ==
=== Australia and Papua New Guinea ===
Australia

- Colony of New South Wales (complete list) –

British colony, 1788–1900
For details see the United Kingdom under British Isles, Europe

Papua New Guinea

- German New Guinea (complete list) –

German colony, 1884–1919
For details see the German Empire under central Europe

- Territory of Papua (complete list) –

British protectorate, 1884–1888
British colony, 1888–1902
For details see the United Kingdom under the British Isles, Europe

=== Pacific ===
Chile

- Easter Island (complete list) –

- Te Kena, King (?)
- Te Tite Anga Henua, King (?)
- Nga'ara, King (c.1835–pre-1860)

Fiji

French Polynesia

- Kings of Alo

- Fonati, King (1784–c.1839)
- Niuliki, King (c.1839–1841)
- Musumusu, Regent (1841–1844)
- Filipo Meitala, King (1844–1862)

- Kingdom of Bora Bora (complete list) –

- Tapoa I, King (1772–1812)
- Mai and Tefaʻaora, rulers (1812–1831)
- Tapoa II, King (1831–1860)

- Kingdom of Huahine (complete list) –

- Tenania, King (1793–1810)
- Mahine Teheiura, King (1810–1815)
- Teriʻitaria II, Queen (1815–1852)

- Mangareva (complete list) –

- Te Oa, son of Te Ariki-tea and Toatau King (?)
- Te Mateoa (or Mapu-rure), King (?–c.1831)
- Te Ika-tohora, King (?–c.1824)
- Te Maputeoa, Gregorio I, King (1830–1857)

- Kingdom of Raiatea (complete list) –

- Tamatoa III, King (1820–1831)
- Tamatoa IV, King (1831–1857)

- Kings of Sigave

- Vanae, King (1800–1839)
- Petelo Keletaona, King (1842–1851)

- Kings of Uvea (Wallis)

- Manuka, King (1767–1810)
- Tufele I, King (1810–1818)
- Muliakaaka, King (1820–1825)
- Uhila, King (1825)
- Toifale, Queen (1825)
- Mulitoto, King (1825–1826)
- Soane-Patita Vaimua Lavelua, King (1826–1829)
- Takala, King (1829–1830)
- Soane-Patita Vaimua Lavelua, King (1830–1858)

New Zealand

- Colony of New Zealand (complete list) –

British colony, 1841–1907
For details see the United Kingdom under British Isles, Europe

- Monarchy of Niue (complete list) –

- Patua-valu, Patu-iki (?)
- Galiga, Patu-iki (?)

- Kingdom of Rarotonga (complete list) –

British protectorate, 1888–1901
For details see the United Kingdom under British Isles, Europe
- Makea Tinirau Ariki, High Chief (?–1823)
- Makea Pori Ariki, High Chief (1823–1839)
- Makea Davida Ariki, High Chief (1839–1845)
- Makea Te Vaerua Ariki, Queen Regnant (1845–1857)

Samoa and American Samoa

- Malietoa dynasty –

- Vai'inupo, Malietoa (?–1841)
- Malietoa Natuitasina, Malietoa (1841–1858)

- Manuʻa Islands (complete list) –

- Seiuli, Manu’a (?)
- U’uolelaoa, Manu’a (?)
- Fagaese, Manu’a (?)
- Tauveve, Manu’a (?)

Solomon Islands

Tonga

- Tuʻi Tonga Empire (complete list) –

- Tupoumālohi, Tuʻi Kanokupolu (1799–1812)
- Tupoutoʻa, Tuʻi Kanokupolu (1808–1820)
- Aleamotuʻa/ Josiah Tupou, Tuʻi Kanokupolu (c.1820–1845)

- Tuʻi Kanokupolu of Tonga (complete list) –

- George Tupou I/ Tāufaʻāhau, King (1845–1893)

Tuvalu

United Kingdom

- Pitcairn Island (complete list) –

- John Adams, Leader (1800–1829)
- Joshua Hill, President (1832–1838)
Became a British colony

United States: Hawaii

- Kauai (complete list) –

- Kaumualiʻi, King of Kaua'i and Ni'ihau (1794–1810)

- Hawaiian Kingdom

- Kings (complete list) –

- Kamehameha I, King (1795–1819)
- Kamehameha II, King (1819–1824)
- Kamehameha III, King (1825–1854)

- Kuhina Nui (complete list) –

- Kaʻahumanu I, Kuhina Nui (1819–1832)
- Kaʻahumanu II, Kuhina Nui (1832–1839)
- Kaʻahumanu III, Kuhina Nui (1839–1845)
- Keoni Ana, Kuhina Nui (1845–1855)

Vanuatu

== See also ==
- List of state leaders in the 18th century
- List of state leaders in the 19th century (1851–1900)
- List of state leaders in the 19th-century Holy Roman Empire
- List of state leaders in 19th-century British South Asia subsidiary states
- List of governors of dependent territories in the 19th century
- List of political entities in the 19th century
