= List of state leaders in the 16th century =

This is a list of state leaders in the 16th century (1501–1600) AD, except for the leaders within the Holy Roman Empire, and the leaders within South Asia.

These polities are generally sovereign states, but excludes minor dependent territories, whose leaders can be found listed under territorial governors in the 16th century. For completeness, these lists can include colonies, protectorates, or other dependent territories that have since gained sovereignty.

== Africa ==
=== Africa: Central ===
Angola

- Kasanje Kingdom (complete list) –

- Kulembe, King (1560s)
- Kinguri, King (1560s)

- Kingdom of Kongo (complete list) –

Kilukeni dynasty

- João I, Manikongo (1470–1509)
- Afonso I, Manikongo (1509–c.1542)
- Pedro I, Manikongo (c.1543–1545)
- Diogo I Nkumbi a Mpudi, Manikongo (1545–1561)
- Afonso II, Manikongo (1561)
- Bernardo I, Manikongo (1561–1567)
- Henrique I, Manikongo (1567–1568)

Kwilu dynasty

- Álvaro I, Manikongo (1568–1587)
- Álvaro II, Manikongo (1587–1614)

- Kingdom of Matamba (complete list) –

- Kambolo Matamba, King (fl.1590s)

- Portuguese Angola (complete list) –

Colony, 1575–1951
For details see the Kingdom of Portugal under Southwest Europe

Cameroon

- Bafut (complete list) –

- Feurlu, King (1516–1552)
- Nebasi Suh, King (1552–1570)
- Ambebi Ferh, King (1570–1635)

- Kingdom of Bamum (complete list) –

- Mengap, Mfon (1498–1519)
- Ngouh I, Mfon (1519–1544)
- Fifen, Mfon (1544–1568)
- Ngouh II, Mfon (1568–1590)
- Ngapna, Mfon (1590–1629)

Chad

- Sultanate of Bagirmi (complete list) –

- Birni Besse, Mbangi (1522–1536)
- Lubatko, Mbangi (1536–1548)
- Malo, Mbangi (1548–1568)
- ‘Abdallah, Mbangi (1568–1608)

Congo, Democratic Republic of the

- Kuba Kingdom (complete list) –

- Lushanjela Shanga, Nyim (16th century)
- Bo Shanga, Nyim (16th century)
- Shamba Bolongongo, Nyim (c.1600)

- Kingdom of Lunda (complete list) –

- Nkonda Matit, Mwaantaangaand (late 16th century)

Congo, Republic of the

- Kingdom of Loango (complete list) –

- Moe Poaty I Kamangou, King (16th or 17th century)

São Tomé and Príncipe

- Portuguese São Tomé and Príncipe (complete list) –

Colony, 1470–1951
For details see the Kingdom of Portugal under Southwest Europe

=== Africa: East ===
Great Lakes area

Burundi

- Kingdom of Burundi (complete list) –

- Ntare I Rushatsi Cambarantama, King (c.1530–c.1550)
- Mwezi I Baridamunka, King (c.1550–c.1580)
- Mutaga I Mutabazi, King (c.1580–c.1600)

Rwanda

- Kingdom of Rwanda (complete list) –

- Ndahiro II Cyamatare, Mwami (1477–1510)
- Ruganzu II Ndoli, Mwami (1510–early 16th century)
- Karemera Rwaka, Mwami (16th century)
- Mutara I Nsoro III Semugeshi, Mwami (16th century)
- Kigeli II Nyamuheshera, King (1576–1609)

South Sudan

- Shilluk Kingdom –

- Nyikang, Rädh (c.1490–1517)
- Odaagø Ocøllø, Rädh (c.1600–1635)

Uganda

- Buganda (complete list) –

- Kayima, Kabaka (c.1494–c.1524)
- Nakibinge, Kabaka (c.1524–c.1554)
- Mulondo, Kabaka (c.1555–1564)
- Jemba, Kabaka (c.1564–c.1584)
- Suuna I, Kabaka (c.1584–c.1614)

Horn of Africa area

Eritrea

- Medri Bahri –

- Yeshaq, Bahr Negus (?–1578)

Ethiopia

- Ethiopian Empire: Solomonic dynasty (complete list) –

- Na'od, Emperor (1494–1508)
- Dawit II, Emperor (1508–1540)
- Gelawdewos, Emperor (1540–1559)
- Menas, Emperor (1559–1563)
- Sarsa Dengel, Emperor (1563–1597)
- Yaqob, Emperor (1597–1603, 1604–1606)

- Ennarea (complete list) –

- Kaba Seyon, Hinnare-tato (c.1450–1530)
- Sepenihi, Hinnare-tato (mid 16th century)
- La'ashonhi, Hinnare-tato (c.1570–1580)
- Badancho, Hinnare-tato (c.1580–1603)

- Kingdom of Garo (complete list) –

- Ambiraj, Tato (1567–1600)

- Kingdom of Kaffa (complete list) –

- Sadi, King (1495–1530)
- Madi Gafine/Gafo, King (1530–1565)
- Bong-he, King (1565–1605)

- Kingdom of Welayta: Tigre dynasty (complete list) –

- Mikael, Kawa (c.1560)
- Girma, Kawa (16th century)

Somalia

- Adal Sultanate: Walashma dynasty (complete list) –

- Muhammad ibn Azhar ad-Din, Sultan (1488–1518)
- Abu Bakr ibn Muhammad, Sultan (1525–1526)
- Umar Din, Sultan (1526–1553)
- Ali ibn Umar Din, Sultan (1553–1555)
- Barakat ibn Umar Din, Sultan (1555–1559)

- Warsangali Sultanate –

- Garad Ali Dable, Sultan (1491–1503)
- Garad Liban, Sultan (1503–1525)
- Garad Yuusuf, Sultan (1525–1555)
- Garad Mohamud III, Sultan (1555–1585)
- Garad Abdale, Sultan (1585–1612)

Madagascar

- Merina Kingdom (complete list) –

- Rangita, Queen (1520–1530)
- Rafohy, Queen (1530–1540)
- Andriamanelo, King (1540–1575)
- Ralambo, King (1575–1612)

=== Africa: Northcentral ===
Ifriqiya

- Hafsid dynasty (complete list) –

- Muhammad IV, Khalif (1494–1526)
- Muhammad V, Khalif (1526–1543)
- Ahmad III, Khalif (1543–1570)
- Muhammad VI, Khalif (1574–1574)
- Jafari "Jafari the Clean" Yahya, Khalif (1574–1581)
- Alem Nafirr, Khalif (1581)

=== Africa: Northeast ===
Egypt

- Abbasid Caliphate, Cairo (complete list) –

- al-Mustamsik, Caliph (1497–1508, 1516–1517)
- al-Mutawakkil III, Caliph (1508–1516, 1517)

- Mamluk Sultanate: Burji dynasty (complete list) –

- Al-Ashraf Janbalat, Sultan (1500–1501)
- Tuman bay I, Sultan (1501)
- Al-Ashraf Qansuh al-Ghuri, Sultan (1501–1516)
- Tuman bay II, Sultan (1516–1517)

Sudan

- Funj Sultanate (complete list) –

- Amara Dunqas, Sultan (1503–1533/4)
- Nayil, Sultan (1533/4–1550/1)
- Abd al-Qadir I, Sultan (1550/1–1557/8)
- Abu Sakikin, Sultan (1557/8–1568)
- Dakin, Sultan (1568–1585/6)
- Dawra, Sultan (1585/6–1587/8)
- Tayyib, Sultan (1587/8–1591)
- Unsa I, Sultan (1591–1603/4)

=== Africa: Northwest ===
Morocco

- Wattasid dynasty of Morocco (complete list) –

- Muhammad ibn Yahya, Sultan (1472–1505)
- Muhammad ibn Muhammad, Sultan (1505–1524)
- Ahmad ibn Muhammad, Sultan (1524–1545, 1545–1547)
- Muhammad ibn Ahmad, Sultan (1545–1547)
- Ahmad ibn Muhammad, Sultan (1524–1545, 1545–1547)

- Saadi dynasty of Morocco (complete list) –

- Muhammad ash-Sheikh, Sultan (1549–1554, 1554–1557)
- Abdallah al-Ghalib, Sultan (1557–1574)
- Muhammad al-Mutawakkil, Sultan (1574–1576)
- Abd al-Malik I, Sultan (1576–1578)
- Ahmad al-Mansur, Sultan (1578–1603)

=== Africa: South ===
Angola

- Kingdom of Ndongo (complete list) –

- Kiluanji Kia Samba, Ngola (c. 1515–1556)
as an independent state
- Ndambi, Ngola (1556–1561)
- Kiluanji kia Ndambi, Ngola (1561–1575)
- Kilombo kia Kasenda, Ngola (1575–1592)
- Mbandi a Ngola, Ngola (1592–1617)

Mozambique

- Portuguese Mozambique (complete list) –

Colony, 1498–1972
For details see the Kingdom of Portugal under Southwest Europe

Zimbabwe

- Kingdom of Mutapa (complete list) –

- Chikuyo Chisamarengu, Mwenemutapa (1494–c.1530)
- Neshangwe Munembire, Mwenemutapa (c.1530–c.1550)
- Chivere Nyasoro, Mwenemutapa (c.1550–1560)
- Negomo Chirisamhuru, Mwenemutapa (1560–1589)
- Gatsi Rusere, Mwenemutapa (1589–1623)

- Rozvi Empire (complete list) –

- Changamire II, King (1494–1530)
- Changamire Tumbare, King (1530–c.1660)

=== Africa: West ===
Benin

- Abomey (complete list) –

- Do-Aklin, ruler (c.1600)

- Kingdom of Benin (complete list) –

- Ozolua, Oba (1480–1504)
- Esigie, Oba (1504–1547)
- Orhogbua, Oba (1547–1580)
- Ehengbuda, Oba (1580–1602)

Burkina Faso

- Mossi Kingdom of Nungu (complete list) –

- Gima, Nunbado (1470–1520)
- Gori, Nunbado (1520–1553)
- Bogora, Nunbado (1553–1571)
- Kampadiboaghi, Nunbado (1571–1615)

Cape Verde

- Portuguese Cape Verde (complete list) –

Colony, 1462–1951
For details see the Kingdom of Portugal under Southwest Europe

Ghana

- Agona (complete list) –

- Mumunumfi, Agonahene (1588–1620)

Guinea-Bissau

- Kaabu –

- Sama Koli, ruler (1537–?)

- Portuguese Guinea (complete list) –

Colony, 1474–1951
For details see the Kingdom of Portugal under Southwest Europe

Mali

- Mali Empire: Keita dynasty (complete list) –

- Mahmud III, Mansa (1496–1559)
- Mahmud IV, Mansa (1590s–1600s)

- Songhai Empire: Askiya dynasty (complete list) –

- Askia Mohammad I, King (1493–1529)
- Askia Musa, King (1529–1531)
- Askia Mohammad Benkan, King (1531–1537)
- Askia Isma'il, King (1537–1539)
- Askia Ishaq I, King (1539–1549)
- Askia Daoud, King (1549–1582/83)
- Askia Al-Hajj, King (1582–1586)
- Askiya Muhammed Bani, son of Askiya Dawud, King (1586–1588)
- Askia Ishaq II, King (1588–1592)

Niger

- Dendi Kingdom: Askiya dynasty (complete list) –

- Muhammad Gao, Askiya (1592)
- Nuh I, Askiya (c.1592–1599)
- al-Mustafa, Askiya (c.1600)

Nigeria

- Bornu Empire (Kanem–Bornu) (complete list) –

- Idris Katakarmabe, Mai (1487–1509)
- Muhammad V Aminami, Mai (1509–1538)
- Ali II of Bornu, Mai (1538–1539)
- Dunama V Ngumarsmma, Mai (1539–1557)
- Dala, Mai (1557–1564)
- Idris Alooma, Mai (1564–1596)
- Muhammed VI Bukalmarami, Mai (1596–1612)

- Oyo Empire (complete list) –

- Onigbogi, Alaafin (c.1500–?)
- Ofirin, Alaafin (16th century)
- Eguguojo, Alaafin (16th century)
- Orompoto, Alaafin (?–c.1600)

- Sultanate of Kano (complete list) –

- Abdullahi dan Rumfa, Sultan (1499–1509)
- Muhammad Kisoki, Sultan (1509–1565)
- Yakubu, Sultan (1565)
- Abu-Bakr Kado, Sultan (1565–1573)
- Muhammad Shashere, Sultan (1573–1582)
- Muhammad Zaki, Sultan (1582–1618)

- Kingdom of Nri (complete list) –

- Eze Nri Anyamata, King (1465–1511)
- Eze Nri Fenenu, King (1512–1582)
- Eze Nri Agụ, King (1583–1676)

Senegal

- Jolof Empire/ Kingdom (complete list) –

- Bukaar Biye-Sungule, Buur-ba (1492–1527)
- Birayma Dyeme-Kumba, Buur-ba (1527–1543)
- Leele Fuli Fak, Buur-ba (1543–1549)
- al-Buri Penda, Buur-ba (1549–1566)
- Lat-Samba, Buur-ba (1566–1597)
- Gireun Buri Dyelen, Buur-ba (1597–1605)

- Cayor (complete list) –

- Detie Fu Ndiogu, ruler (1549–?)

- Saloum (complete list) –

- Malaw tane Joof, (variation: Maléotane Diouf - French spelling in Senegal), Maad Saloum (1567)

== Americas ==
=== Americas: North ===
Canada

- Canada (New France) (complete list) –

French colony, 1535–1763
For details see France under western Europe

Mexico

- Tenochtitlan of the Aztec Empire (complete list) –

- Ahuitzotl, 8th Hueyi Tlatoani (1486–1502)
- Moctezuma II Xocoyotzin, 9th Hueyi Tlatoani (1502–1520)
- Cuitalahuac II, 10th Hueyi Tlatoani (1520)
- Cuauhtémoc, 11th Hueyi Tlatoani (1520–1521)

Spanish conquest of the Aztec Empire

- Juan Velázquez Tlacotzin, Cihuacoatl (1525–1526)
- Andrés de Tapia Motelchiuh, Cuauhtlato (1525–1530)
- Pablo Xochiquentzin, Cuauhtlato (1530–1536)
- Diego de Alvarado Huanitzin, Tlatoani (1538–1541)
- Diego de San Francisco Tehuetzquititzin, Tlatoani (1541–1554)

- Tarascan state (complete list) –

- Zuangua, Cazonci (1479–1520)
- Tangáxuan II, Cazonci (1520–1530)

- Tlaxcala (Nahua state) –

- Ocotelolco –

- Maxixcatl, Tlatoani (?–1520)

- Tizatlan –

- Xicotencatl I, Tlatoani (1425–1522)
- Xicotencatl II, Tlacochcalcatl, de facto ruler (?–1521)

- Zapotec civilization –

- Zaachila –

- Cocijoeza, Emperor (1487–1529)

- Tehuantepec –

- Cosijopii I, King (1529–1563)

- Viceroyalty of New Spain (complete list) –

Spanish Colony, 1521–1821
For details see Spain in southwest Europe

=== Americas: South ===
Brazil

- Colonial Brazil (complete list) –

Portuguese colony, 1500/1534–1808
For details see the Kingdom of Portugal under Southwest Europe

Chile

- Captaincy General of Chile (complete list) –

Spanish Colony, 1541–1818
For details see Spain in southwest Europe

Colombia

- Muisca Confederation

- Zaque (complete list) –

- Quemuenchatocha, Zaque (1490–1537)
- Aquiminzaque, Zaque (1537–1540)

- Zipa (complete list) –

- Nemequene, Zipa (1490–1514)
- Tisquesusa, Zipa (1514–1537)
- Sagipa, Zipa (1537–1539)

Peru

- Inca Empire (complete list) –

- Huayna Capac, Emperor (1493–1525)
- Huascar, Emperor (1493–1525)
- Huayna Capac, Emperor (1525–1532)
- Atahualpa, Emperor (1532–1533)

- Neo-Inca State (complete list) –

- Manco Inca Yupanqui, Emperor (1535–1544)
- Sayri Túpac, Emperor (1544–1558)
- Titu Cusi, Emperor (1558–1571)
- Túpac Amaru, Emperor (1571–1572)

- Viceroyalty of Peru (complete list) –

Spanish Colony, 1542–1824
For details see Spain in southwest Europe

== Asia ==
=== Asia: Central ===
Kazakhstan

- Moghulistan, (complete list) –

- Ahmad Alaq, Khan of Eastern Moghulistan (1487–1503)
- Mahmud, Khan of Western Moghulistan (1487–1508)
- Mansur, Khan of Eastern Moghulistan (1503–1508), of All Moghulistan (1508–1514), of Eastern Moghulistan (1514–1548)
- Shah, Khan of Eastern Moghulistan (1543–1560)
- Muhammad ibn Mansur, Khan of Eastern Moghulistan (1570)

- Kazakh Khanate (complete list) –

- Burunduk, Khan (1480–1511)
- Kasym, Khan (1511–1521)
- Mamash, Khan (1521–1523)
- Tahir, Khan (1523–1533)
- Buidash, Khan (1533–1534)
- Qozhamqut, Khan (1534–1535)
- Togym, Khan (1535–1537)
- Khaqnazar, Khan (1538–1580)
- Shygai, Khan (1580–1582)
- Tauekel, Khan (1582–1598)
- Esim, Khan (1598–1628)

- Kara Del

- Šamba, Khan (1492–1493, 1497–1505)
- Beyazıt, Khan (1505–1513)

Russia

- Great Horde (complete list) –

- Shayk Ahmad, Khan (1481–1498, 1499–1502)

- Khanate of Sibir (complete list) –

- Abalak of Sibir, Khan (1496–1501)
- Muhammad Taibuga, Khan (1495–1502)
- Aguish, Khan (1502–1503)
- Kuluk Sultan, Khan (1502–1530)
- Qasim, Khan (1504–1530)
- Yadgar bin Qasim, Khan (1530–1563)
- Kuchum, Khan (1563–1598)

Tajikistan

- Yarkent Khanate, Western Moghulistan (complete list) –

- Said, Khan (1514–1533)
- Abdurashid, Khan (1533–1560)
- Abdul Karim, Khan (1560–1591)
- Muhammad, Khan (1591–1610)

Tibet

- Guge

- sTod tsha 'Phags pa lha, King (c.1485–post-1499)
- Shakya 'od, King (early 16th century)
- Jig rten dBang phyug Pad kar lde, King (fl.1537–1555)
- Ngag gi dBang phyug, King (16th century)
- Nam mkha dBang phyug, King (16th century)
- Khri Nyi ma dBang phyug, King (late 16th century)
- Khri Grags pa'i dBang phyug, King (c.1600)

- Phagmodrupa dynasty (complete list) –

- Ngawang Tashi Drakpa, Monarch (1499–1554)
- Ngawang Drakpa Gyaltsen, Monarch (1554–1556/1557)
- Ngawang Tashi Drakpa, Monarch (1556/57–1564)
- Ngawang Drakpa Gyaltsen, Monarch (1576–1603/1604)

- Rinpungpa (complete list) –

- Donyo Dorje, Monarch (c.1479–1512)
- Ngawang Namgyal, Monarch (1512–1544)
- Dondup Tseten Dorje, Monarch (1544–?)
- Ngawang Jigme Drakpa, Monarch (?–1565)

- Tsangpa (complete list) –

- Karma Tseten, Monarch (1565–1599)
- Khunpang Lhawang Dorje, Monarch (c.1582–1605/1606)
- Karma Thutob Namgyal, Monarch (c.1586–1610)
- Karma Tensung, Monarch (1599–1611)

Uzbekistan

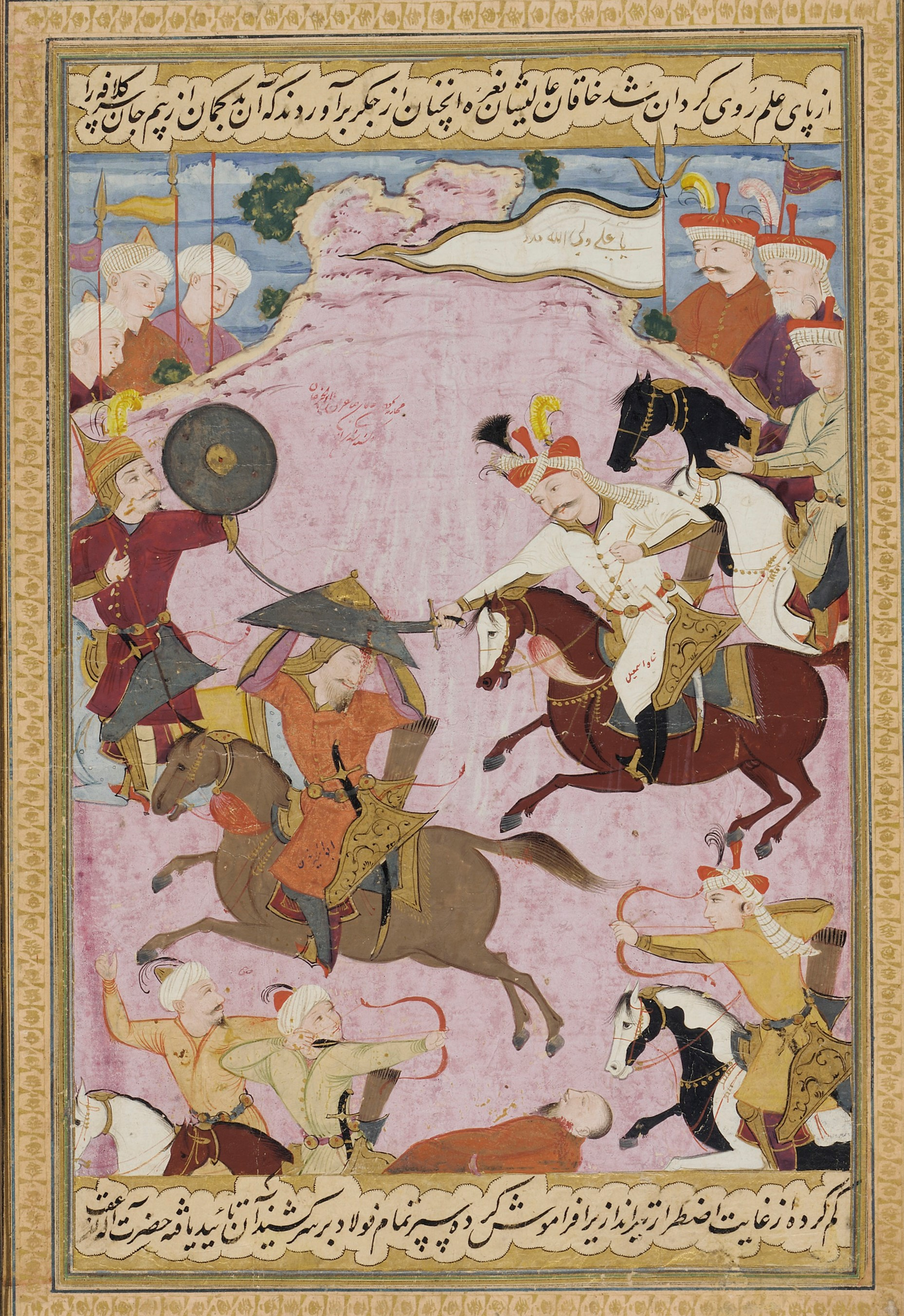
The battle between Shah Ismail I and Muhammad Shaybani in 1510.

- Muhammad Shayabani, Khan (1500–1510)
- Kochkunju Muhammad bin Abul-Khayr, Khan (1512–1531)
- Abu Sa'id bin Kochkunju, Khan (1531–1534)
- Ubaydullah, Khan (1534–1539)
- Abdullah I, Khan (1539–1540)
- Abdal-Latif bin Kochkunju, Khan (1540–1552)
- Nawruz Ahmed, Khan (1552–1556)
- Pir Muhammad I, Khan (1556–1561)
- Iskander bin Jani Beg, Khan (1561–1583)
- Abdullah II, Khan (1583–1598)
- Abdul-Mo'min bin Abdullah, Khan (1598)
- Pir Muhammad, Khan (1598–1599)
- Baqi Muhammad, Khan (1599–1605)

- Khanate of Khiva (complete list) –

- Ilbars I, Khan (1511–1518)
- Sultan Haji, Khan (1518–1519)
- Hasan Quli, Khan (1519–1524)
- Sufyan, Khan (1529–1535)
- Bujugha, Khan (1524–1529)
- Avnik, Khan (1535–1538)
- Qal, Khan (1539–1549)
- Aqatay, Khan (1549–1557)
- Dust Muhammad, Khan (1557–1558)
- Haji Muhammad I, Khan (1558–1602)

=== Asia: East ===
China: Ming dynasty

- Ming dynasty (complete list) –

- Hongzhi, Emperor (1487–1505)
- Zhengde, Emperor (1505–1521)
- Jiajing, Emperor (1521–1567)
- Longqing, Emperor (1567–1572)
- Wanli, Emperor (1572–1620)

Japan

- Ashikaga shogunate of Japan

- Emperors (complete list) –

- Go-Kashiwabara, Emperor (1500–1526)
- Go-Nara, Emperor (1526–1557)
- Ōgimachi, Emperor (1557–1586)

- Shōguns –

- Yoshizumi, Shōgun (1493–1508)
- Yoshitane, Shōgun (1508–1521)
- Yoshiharu, Shōgun (1521–1545)
- Yoshiteru, Shōgun (1545–1565)
- Yosihide, Shōgun (1564–1568)
- Yoshiaki, Shōgun (1568–1573)

- Azuchi–Momoyama period Japan

- Emperors (complete list) –

- Ōgimachi, Emperor (1557–1586)
- Go-Yōzei, Emperor (1586–1611)

- Ryukyu Kingdom: Second Shō dynasty –

Tributary state of the Ming dynasty, 1429–1644
- Shō Shin, King (1477–1526)
- Shō Sei, King (1526–1555)
- Shō Gen, King (1556–1572)
- Shō Ei, King (1573–1588)
- Shō Nei, King (1589–1620)

Korea

- Joseon (complete list) –

- Yeonsangun, King (1494–1506)
- Jungjong, King (1506–1544)
- Injong, King (1544–1545)
- Myeongjong, King (1545–1567)
- Seonjo, King (1567–1608)

Mongolia

- Northern Yuan dynasty (complete list) –

- Dayan, Khan (1478–1516)
- Bars Bolud Jinong, Khan (1516–1519)
- Bodi Alagh, Khan (1519–1547)
- Daraisung Guden, Khan (1547–1557)
- Tümen Jasagtu, Khan (1557–1592)
- Buyan Sechen, Khan (1592–1603)

=== Asia: Southeast ===
Brunei

- Bruneian Empire (complete list) –

- Bolkiah, Sultan (1485–1524)
- Abdul Kahar, Sultan (1524–1530)
- Saiful Rijal, Sultan (1533–1581)
- Shah Berunai, Sultan (1581–1582)
- Muhammad Hassan, Sultan (1582–1598)
- Abdul Jalilul Akbar, Sultan (1598–1659)

Cambodia

- Kingdom of Cambodia: Middle Period (complete list) –

- Thommo Reachea I, King (1476–1504)
- Srey Sukonthor, King (1504–1512)
- Sdach Korn, King (1512–1521)
- Ang Chan I, King (1516–1566)
- Barom Reachea I, King (1566–1576)
- Chey Chettha I, King (1576–1594)
- Preah Ram I, King (1594–1596)
- Preah Ram II, King (1596–1597)
- Barom Reachea II, King (1597–1599)
- Barom Reachea III, King (1599–1600)
- Ponhea Nhom, King (1600–1603)

Indonesia

Indonesia: Java

- Sunda Kingdom (complete list) –

- Sri Baduga, Maharaja (1482–1521)
- Prabu Surawisesa Jayaperkosa, Maharaja (1521–1535)
- Ratu Dewata, Maharaja (1535–1543)
- Ratu Sakti, Maharaja (1543–1551)
- Nilakendra, Maharaja (1551–1567)
- Raja Mulya, Maharaja (1567–1579)

- Majapahit: Rajasa dynasty (complete list) –

- Prabu Udara, King (1489–1527)

- Tuban –

- Raden Arya Wilatikta, King (fl.1513)
- Kyai Arya Ngrasena, King (early 16th century)
- Kyai Arya Gegelang, King (early 16th century)
- Kyai Arya Batubang, King (mid 16th century)
- Pangeran Arya Balewot, King (mid 16th century)
- Pangeran Sekar Tanjung, King (late 16th century)
- Pangeran Ngangsar, King (late 16th century)
- Pangeran Arya Pamalad, King (fl.1587)
- Arya Salempe, King (16th/17th century)

- Demak Sultanate (complete list) –

- Raden Patah, Sultan (1475–1518)
- Pati Unus, Sultan (1518–1521)
- Trenggana, Sultan (1521–1546)
- Sunan Mukmin, Sultan (1546–1549)
- Arya Penangsang, Sultan (1549–1554)

- Giri –

- Sunan Giri, Sultan (1485–1506)
- Sunan Dalem, Sultan (1506–1545/46)
- Sunan Seda Margi, Sultan (1545/46–1548)
- Sunan Prapen, Sultan (1548–1605)

- Kingdom of Pajang (complete list) –

- Joko Tingkir, Sultan (c.1568–1586)

- Kalinyamat Sultanate –

- Hadlirin, Sultan (1527–1549)
- Ratu Kalinyamat, Queen (1549–1579)
- Pangeran Arya Jepara, Raja (1579–1599)

- Duchy of Surabaya (complete list) –

- Kyai Sinuhun Ngampeldenta, Adipati (fl.c.1500)
- Pecat Tanda Terung, Adipati (fl.c.1513)
- Pangeran Tundungmusuh, Adipati (16th century)
- Pangeran Lena, Adipati (16th century)
- Pangeran Jebuk, Adipati (16th century)
- Pangeran Wanakrama, Adipati (late 16th century)
- Panembahan Rama, Adipati (16th/17th century)
- Pangeran Surabaya, Adipati (16th/17th century)

- Blambangan Kingdom (complete list) –

- Bima Koncar/Minak Sumedhe, King (15th/16th century)
- Menak Pentor, King (fl.1513)
- Santaguna, King (fl.c.1575)
- N.N., King (fl.1588)
- N.N., King (?–1597)

- Pasuruan –

- Menak Sepetak, King (fl.1513)
- Adipati Dengkol, King (16th century)

- Banten Sultanate (complete list) –

- Maulana Hasanuddin (c.1552–1570)
- Maulana Yusuf, Sultan (c.1570–1580)
- Maulana Muhammad, Sultan (c.1580–1596)
- Pangeran Ratu, Sultan (1596–1651)

- Sultanate of Cirebon (complete list) –

- Sunan Gunungjati, Sultan (1479–1568)
- Fatahillah, General (1568–1570)
- Panembahan Ratu, Sultan (c.1570–1649)

- Bangkalan –

- Ki Pragalba, Sultan (?–1531)
- Raden Pratanu, Sultan (1531–1592/96)
- Raden Kara, Sultan (1592/6–1621)

- Sumenep –

- Raden Tumenggung Kanduruwan, Sultan (?–1579)
- Pangeran Ellor I, Sultan (c.1579–?)
- Pangeran Wetan, Sultan (c.1600)

- Mataram Sultanate (complete list) –

- Senopati, Sultan (1587–1601)

Indonesia: Sumatra

- Samudera Pasai Sultanate (complete list) –

- Adlullah, Sultan (1495–1506)
- Muhammad Syah III, Sultan (1506–1507)
- Abdullah, Sultan (1507–1509)
- Ahmad V, Sultan (1509–1514)
- Zainal Abidin IV, Sultan (1514–1517)

- Aceh Sultanate (complete list) –

- Ali Mughayat Syah, Sultan (c.1514–1530)
- Salahuddin, Sultan (1530–c.1537/39)
- Alauddin al-Kahar, Sultan (c.1537/39–1571)
- Ali Ri'ayat Syah I, Sultan (1571–1579)
- Muda, Sultan (1579)
- Sri Alam, Sultan (1579)
- Zainul Abidin, Sultan (1579)
- Alauddin Mansur Syah, Sultan (1579–1585/86)
- Buyung, Sultan (1585/86–1589)
- Alauddin Ri'ayat Syah Sayyid al-Mukammal, Sultan (1589–1604)

- Sultanate of Langkat –

- Panglima Dewa Shahdan, Raja (1568–1580)
- Panglima Dewa Sakti, Raja (1580–1612)

Indonesia: Kalimantan (Borneo)

- Sultanate of Banjar (complete list) –

- Suriansyah, Sultan (1520–1546)
- Rahmatullah, Sultan (1546–1570)
- Hidayatullah I, Sultan (1570–1595)
- Mustain Billah, Sultan (1595–1638)

- Sultanate of Bulungan –

- Datuk Mencang (Seorang bangsawan dari Brunei), beristrikan Asung Luwan, ruler (1555–1594)
- Singa Laut, Menantu dari Datuk Mencang, ruler (1594–1618)

- Negara Daha –

- Mangkubumi, Maharaja (15th/16th century)
- Tumenggung, Maharaja (?–1526)

- Sultanate of Sambas (complete list) –

- Timbang Paseban, Governor, Sultan (1600–1609)

- Sultanate of Sintang –

- Abang Samat Semah, Prince (?)
- Abang Ismail Zubair Mail Jubairi Irawan II, Prince (?)
- Abang Suruh, Prince of Sintang, son of Abang Ismail Zubair Mail Jubairi Irawan II, Prince (?)
- Abang Tembilang Ari, Prince (?)
- Abang Pencin Pontin, Prince (c.1600–1643)

Indonesia: Sulawesi

- Sultanate of Gowa –

- Batara Gowa, King (15th/16th century)
- Pakere Tau Tunijallo ri Passukki, King (c.1510)
- Tumapa'risi', King (c.1510–1546)
- Lakiung, King (1546–1565)
- Marompa, King (1565)
- Bontolangkasa, King (late 16th century)
- Tuni Pasulu, King (c.1593)
- Alau'ddin, Sultan (1593–1639)

- Luwu –

- Risaolebbi, Datu (1465–1507)
- Dewaraja, Datu (1507–1541)
- Tosangkawana, Datu (1541–1556)
- Maoge, Datu (1556–1571)
- E Tenri Rawe’, Datu (1571–1587)
- Andi Pattiware’ Daeng Parabung, Datu (1587–1615)

Indonesia: Lesser Sunda Islands

- Bali Kingdom: Gelgel (complete list) –

- Dalem Ketut, King (c.1520)
- Dalem Baturenggong, King (mid 16th century)
- Dalem Bekung, King (fl.1558–1578/1630s)
- Dalem Seganing, King (c.1580–1623 or ?–1650)

Indonesia: Maluku Islands

- Sultanate of Bacan (complete list) –

- Muhammad Bakir, Sultan (c.1500)
- Zainal Abidin, Sultan (pre-1512–c.1557)
- Bayansirullah/ Dom João, Sultan (c.1557–1578/79)
- Dom Henrique, Sultan (1578/79–1581)
- Alauddin I, Sultan (1581–c.1609)

- Sultanate of Jailolo –

- Kaicil Yusuf, Sultan (fl.1514–1521)
- Kaicil Firuz Alauddin, Sultan (c.1532–1536)
- Katarabumi, Sultan (1536–1552)
- Kaicili Guzarate, Sultan (1552–?)

- Sultanate of Tidore (complete list) –

- Jamaluddin/Ciri Leliati, Sultan (1495–1512)
- Al-Mansur I, Sultan (before 1512–1526)
- Amiruddin Iskandar Dul-Karna’in, Sultan (1526–c.1560)
- Kie Mansur, Sultan (c.1560–?)
- Kaicili Bungua, Sultan (fl.1570)
- Gaua, Iskandar Sani, Sultan (pre-1582)
- Gapi Baguna, Sultan (pre-1582–1599)
- Mole Majimu, Sultan (1599–1627)

- Sultanate of Ternate (complete list) –

- Bayanullah, Sultan (1500–1522)
- Hidayatullah, Sultan (1522–1529)
- Abu Hayat, Sultan (1529–1533)
- Tabariji, Sultan (1533–1534)
- Khairun Jamil, Sultan (1535–1570)
- Babullah Datu Shah, Sultan (1570–1583)
- Said Barakat Shah, Sultan (1583–1606)

Laos

- Lan Xang (complete list) –

- Somphou, King (1496–1501)
- Visoun, King (1500–1520)
- Photisarath I, King (1520–1548)
- Setthathirath, King (1548–1571)
- Sen Soulintha, King (1571–1575)
- Voravongsa I, King (1575–1579)
- Sen Soulintha, King (1580–1582)
- Nakhon Noi, King (1582–1583)
- Nokeo Koumane, King (1591–1598)
- Voravongsa II, King (1598–1622)

Malaysia

Peninsular Malaysia

- Johor Sultanate (complete list) –

- Alauddin Riayat Shah II, Sultan (1528–1564)
- Muzaffar Shah II, Sultan (1564–1570)
- Abdul Jalil Shah I, Sultan (1570–1571)
- Ali Jalla Abdul Jalil Shah II, Sultan (1571–1597)
- Alauddin Riayat Shah III, Sultan (1597–1615)

- Kedah Sultanate (complete list) –

- Muhammad Jiwa Zainal Adilin Mu'adzam Shah I, Sultan (1473–1506)
- Mahmud Shah II, Sultan (1506–1547)
- Mudzaffar Shah III, Sultan (1547–1602)

- Kelantan Sultanate (complete list) –

Jambi dynasty
- Mansur Shah, Sultan (1467–1522)
- Gombak, Sultan (1522–1526)
- Ahmad Shah, Sultan (1526–1547)
- Mansur Shah, Sultan (1547–1561)
- Ibrahim, Sultan (1561–1565, 1570–1579)
- Umar bin Raja Ahmad, Raja (1565–1570)
Champa dynasty
- Addil ud-din, Sultan (1579–1597, 1602–1605)
- Muhammad ibni al-Marhum Sultan Ibrahim, Sultan (1597–1602)

- Malacca Sultanate

- Sultans –

- Mahmud Shah, Sultan (1488–1511, 1513–1528)
- Ahmad Shah, Sultan (1511–1513)

- Bendaharas –

- Tun Perpatih Putih, Bendahara (1498–1500)
- Tun Mutahir of Malacca, Bendahara (1500–1510)
- Paduka Tuan, Bendahara (1510–1511)

- Pahang Sultanate (complete list) –

- Abdul Jamil Shah, Sultan (1495–1512)
- Mansur Shah I, Sultan (1495–1519)
- Mahmud Shah, Sultan (1519–1530)
- Muzaffar Shah, Sultan (1530–1540)
- Zainal Abidin Shah, Sultan (1540–1555)
- Mansur Shah II, Sultan (1555–1560)
- Abdul Jamal Shah, Sultan (1560–1575)
- Abdul Kadir Alauddin Shah, Sultan (1560–1590)
- Ahmad Shah II, Sultan (1590–1592)
- Abdul Ghafur Muhiuddin Shah, Sultan (1592–1614)

- Perak Sultanate: Malacca dynasty (complete list) –

- Muzaffar Riayat Shah I, Sultan (1528–1549)
- Mansur Shah I, Sultan (1549–1577)
- Ahmad Tajuddin Shah, Sultan (1577–1584)
- Tajul Ariffin Shah, Sultan (1584–1594)
- Alauddin Riayat Shah I, Sultan (1594–1603)

Malaysian Borneo

- Sultanate of Sarawak –

- Tengah, Sultan (1599–1641)

Myanmar / Burma

- Kingdom of Ava (complete list) –

- Minkhaung II, King (1480–1501)
- Thihathura II, Co-King (1485–1501)
- Shwenankyawshin, King (1501–1527)
- Thohanbwa, King (1527–1542)
- Hkonmaing, King (1542–1545)
- Mobye Narapati, King (1545–1551)
- Sithu Kyawhtin, King (1551–1555)

- Hanthawaddy kingdom (complete list) –

- Binnya Ran II, King (c.1492–1526)
- Takayutpi, King (1526–1539)
- Smim Sawhtut, King (1550)
- Smim Htaw, King (1550–1552)

- Kengtung (complete list) –

- Ai Lao (艾劳), Saopha (1474–1501)
- Sao Naojiang, Saopha (1501–1503)

- Mongyang State –

- Sawlon, Saopha (1500s–1533)

- Kingdom of Mrauk U (complete list) –

- Salingathu, King (1494–1502)
- Raza, King (1502–1513)
- Gazapati, King (1513–1515)
- Saw O, King (1515–1515)
- Thazata, King (1515–1521)
- Minkhaung, King (1521–1531)
- Min Bin, King (1531–1554)
- Dikkha, King (1554–1556)
- Saw Hla, King (1556–1564)
- Sekkya, King (1564–1572)
- Hpalaung, King (1572–1593)
- Razagri, King (1593–1612)

- Prome Kingdom (complete list) –

- Bayin Htwe, King (1526–1532)
- Narapati, King (1532–1539)
- Minkhaung, King (1539–1542)

- First Toungoo Empire: Toungoo dynasty (complete list) –

- Mingyi Nyo, King (1510–1530)
- Tabinshwehti, King (1530–1550)
- Bayinnaung, King (1550–1581)
- Nanda Bayin, King (1581–1599)

- Toungoo dynasty, Nyaungyan Restoration (complete list) –

- Nyaungyan Min, King (1599–1605)

Philippines

- Tondo (complete list) –

- Dayang Kalangitan, Queen (1450–c.1515)
- Sulaiman, Rajah (early 1500s)
- Ysmeria, Princess (early 1500s)
- Matanda, Rajah (c.1521–1572)
- Lakandula, Lakan (c.1558–1571)
- Sulayman, Rajah (1571–1575)
- Magat Salamat, Datu (1575–1589)

- Rajahnate of Butuan (complete list) –

- Siagu, Rajah (?–1521)

- Namayan (complete list) –

- Tagkan, Lakan (15th/16th century)
- Palaba, ruler (mid 16th century)
- Laboy, ruler (mid 16th century)
- Kalamayin, Rajah (1570s)

- Dailisan, Datu (c.1563)

- Madja-as (complete list) –

- Padojinog, Datu (15th/16th century)
- Kabnayag, Datu (?–1565)
- Lubay, Datu (16th century)

- Rajahnate of Maynila (complete list) –

- Salalila, Rajah (pre-1521)
- unnamed, Queen (c.1521)
- Matanda, Rajah (pre-1521–1572)
- Sulayman, Rajah (c.1571)

- Rajahnate of Cebu –

- Parang the Limp, Rajah (15th/16th century)
- Humabon, Rajah (c.1521)
- Tupas, Rajah (?–1565)

- Sultanate of Sulu (complete list) –

- Kamal ud-Din, Sultan (1480–1505)
- Ala ud-Din, Sultan (?)
- Amir ul-Umara, Sultan (1505–1527)
- Muizz ul-Mutawadi-in, Sultan (1527–1548)
- Nasir ud-Din I, Sultan (1548–1568)
- Muhammad ul-Halim, Sultan (1568–1596)
- Batarah Shah Tengah, Sultan (1596–1608)

- Sultanate of Maguindanao (complete list) –

- Sharif Kabungsuwan, Sultan (1520–1543)
- Maka-alang Saripada, Sultan (1543–?)
- Datu Bangkaya, Sultan (?–1578)
- Dimasangcay Adel, Sultan (1578–1585)
- Gugu Sarikula, Sultan (1585–1597)
- Kapitan Laut Buisan, Sultan (1597–1619)

- Spanish East Indies, part of the Captaincy General of the Philippines (complete list) –

Colony, 1565–1901
For details see Spain in southwest Europe

Thailand

- Ayutthaya Kingdom (complete list) –

Suphannaphum dynasty
- Ramathibodi II, King (1491–1529)
- Borommarachathirat IV, King (1529–1533)
- Ratsadathirat, King (1533/34)
- Chairachathirat, King (1534–1546)
- Yotfa, King (1546–1548)
- Worawongsathirat, King (1548)
- Maha Chakkraphat, King (1548–1564, 1568–1564)
- Mahinthrathirat, Vassal King (1564–1568), King (1569)
Sukhothai dynasty
- Mahathammarachathirat, King of Sukhothai (1548–1569), King of Ayutthaya (1569–1590)
- Naresuan, King of Sukhothai (1570–1590), King of Ayutthaya (1590–1605)

- Lan Na (complete list) –

Mangrai dynasty
- Kaew, King (1495–1525)
- Ket, King (1525–1538, 1543–1545)
- Chai, King (1538–1543)
- Chiraprapha, Queen (1545–1546)
- Setthathirat, King (1546–1547)
- Mae Ku, King (1551–1558)
Burmese rule
- Mae Ku, independent King (1551–1558), King (1558–1564)
- Wisutthithewi, King (1565–1578)
- Nawrahta Minsaw, King (1579–1607/08)

- Pattani Kingdom: Inland dynasty (complete list) –

- Intera / Phaya Tu Nakpa / Sultan Ismail Shah, Raja (?–c.1530)
- Mudhaffar Shah, Sultan (c.1530–1564)
- Manzur Shah, Sultan (1564–1572)
- Patik Siam, Sultan (1572–1573)
- Bahdur, Sultan (1573–1584)
- Ratu Hijau, Queen (1584–1616)

Vietnam

- Đại Việt: Later Lê dynasty (complete list) –

- Lê Hiến Tông, Emperor (1497–1504)
- Lê Túc Tông, Emperor (1504–1504)
- Lê Uy Mục, Emperor (1505–1509)
- Lê Tương Dực, Emperor (1510–1516)
- Lê Quang Trị, Emperor (1516–1516)
- Lê Chiêu Tông, Emperor (1516–1522)
- Lê Bảng, Emperor (1518–1519)
- Lê Do, Emperor (1519–1519)
- Lê Cung Hoàng, Emperor (1522–1527)

- Đại Việt: Mạc dynasty (complete list) –

- Mạc Thái Tổ, Emperor (1527–1529)
- Mạc Thái Tông, Emperor (1530–1540)
- Mạc Hiến Tông, Emperor (1541–1546)
- Mạc Chính Trung, Emperor (1546–1547)
- Mạc Tuyên Tông, Emperor (1546–1561)
- Mạc Mậu Hợp, Emperor (1562–1592)
- Mạc Toàn, Emperor (1592)
- Mạc Kính Chỉ, Emperor (1592–1593)
- Mạc Kính Cung, Emperor (1593–1625)

- Đại Việt: Revival Lê dynasty (complete list) –

- Lê Trang Tông, Emperor (1533–1548)
- Lê Trung Tông, Emperor (1548–1556)
- Lê Anh Tông, Emperor (1556–1573)
- Lê Thế Tông, Emperor (1573–1599)
- Lê Kính Tông, Emperor (1600–1619)

- Nguyễn lords (complete list) –

- Nguyễn Hoàng, Lord (1558–1613)

- Trịnh lords (complete list) –

- Trịnh Kiểm, Lord (1545–1570)
- Trịnh Tùng, Lord (1570–1623)

=== Asia: West ===
Iran

- Safavid Iran (complete list) –

- Ismail I, Shah (1501–1524)
- Tahmasp I, Shah (1524–1576)
- Ismail II, Shah (1576–1577)
- Mohammad Khodabanda, Shah (1577–1587)
- Abbas I, Shah (1587–1629)

Oman

- Nabhani dynasty (complete list) –

- Muhammad bin Ismail, Malik (1500–1529)
- Barakat bin Muhammad, Malik (1529–1560)
- Abdulla bin Muhammad, Malik (1560–1624)

Turkey

- Ottoman Empire

- Sultans –

- Bayezid II, Sultan (1481–1512)
- Selim I, Sultan (1512–1520)
- Suleiman the Magnificent, Sultan (1520–1566)
- Selim II, Sultan (1566–1574)
- Murad III, Sultan (1574–1595)
- Mehmed III, Sultan (1595–1603)

- Grand Viziers –

- Yakub Pasha, Grand Vizier (1499–1501)
- Mesih Pasha, Grand Vizier (1501)
- Hadim Ali Pasha, Grand Vizier (1501–1503)
- Hersekzade Ahmed Pasha, Grand Vizier (1503–1506)
- Hadim Ali Pasha, Grand Vizier (1509–1511)
- Koca Mustafa Pasha, Grand Vizier (1511–1512)
- Dukakinzade Ahmed Pasha, Grand Vizier (1512–1515)
- Hersekzade Ahmed Pasha, Grand Vizier (1515–1516)
- Hadım Sinan Pasha, Grand Vizier (1516–1517)
- Yunus Pasha, Grand Vizier (1517)
- Piri Mehmed Pasha, Grand Vizier (1517–1523)
- Pargalı Ibrahim Pasha, Grand Vizier (1523–1536)
- Ayas Mehmed Pasha, Grand Vizier (1536–1539)
- Lütfi Pasha, Grand Vizier (1539–1541)
- Hadım Suleiman Pasha, Grand Vizier (1541–1544)
- Rüstem Pasha, Grand Vizier (1544–1553)
- Kara Ahmed Pasha, Grand Vizier (1553–1555)
- Rüstem Pasha, Grand Vizier (1555–1561)
- Semiz Ali Pasha, Grand Vizier (1561–1565)
- Sokollu Mehmed Pasha, Grand Vizier (1565–1579)
- Şemiz Ahmed Pasha, Grand Vizier (1579–1580)
- Lala Kara Mustafa Pasha, Grand Vizier (1580)
- Koca Sinan Pasha, Grand Vizier (1580–1582)
- Kanijeli Siyavuş Pasha, Grand Vizier (1582–1584)
- Özdemiroğlu Osman Pasha, Grand Vizier (1584–1585)
- Hadim Mesih Pasha, Grand Vizier (1585–1586)
- Kanijeli Siyavuş Pasha, Grand Vizier (1586–1589)
- Koca Sinan Pasha, Grand Vizier (1589–1591)
- Serdar Ferhad Pasha, Grand Vizier (1591–1592)
- Kanijeli Siyavuş Pasha, Grand Vizier (1592–1593)
- Koca Sinan Pasha, Grand Vizier (1593–1595)
- Serdar Ferhad Pasha, Grand Vizier (1595)
- Lala Mehmed Pasha, Grand Vizier (1595)
- Koca Sinan Pasha, Grand Vizier (1595–1596)
- Damat Ibrahim Pasha, Grand Vizier (1596)
- Cigalazade Yusuf Sinan Pasha, Grand Vizier (1596)
- Damat Ibrahim Pasha, Grand Vizier (1596–1597)
- Hadım Hasan Pasha, Grand Vizier (1597–1598)
- Cerrah Mehmed Pasha, Grand Vizier (1598–1599)
- Damat Ibrahim Pasha, Grand Vizier (1599–1601)

Yemen

- Kathiri State of Seiyun –

- Badr ibn 'Abdallah, Sultan (c.1516–c.1565)

- Yemeni Zaidi State (complete list) –

- al-Mansur Muhammad, Imam (1475–1504)
- an-Nasir al-Hasan, Imam (1495–1523)
- al-Mutawakkil Yahya Sharaf ad-Din, Imam (1506–1555)
- al-Mutahhar, Imam (1547–1572)
- an-Nasir al-Hasan bin Ali, Imam (1579–1585)
- al-Mansur al-Qasim, Imam (1597–1620)

== Europe ==
=== Europe: Balkans ===
- Hospitaller Rhodes: Knights Hospitaller (complete list) –

- Pierre d'Aubusson, Grand Master (1476–1503)
- Emery d'Amboise, Grand Master (1503–1512)
- Guy de Blanchefort, Grand Master (1512–1513)
- Fabrizio del Carretto, Grand Master (1513–1521)

- Duchy of the Archipelago (complete list) –

- Francesco III, Duke (1500–1511)
- Giovanni IV, Duke (1517–1564)
- Giacomo IV, Duke (1564–1566)

- Prince-Bishopric of Montenegro (complete list) –

- Vavila, Prince-bishop (1516–1520)
- German II, Prince-bishop (1520–1530)
- Pavle, Prince-bishop (1530–1532)
- Vasilije I, Prince-bishop (1532–1540)
- Nikodim, Prince-bishop (1540)
- Romi, Prince-bishop (1540–1559)
- Makarije, Prince-bishop (1560–1561)
- Ruvim I, Prince-bishop (1561–1569)
- Pahomije II, Prince-bishop (1569–1579)
- Gerasim, Prince-bishop (1575–1582)
- Venijamin, Prince-bishop (1582–1591)
- Nikanor and Stefan, Prince-bishop (1591–1593)
- Ruvim II, Prince-bishop (1593–1636)

Croatia

- Kingdom of Croatia (Habsburg)

- Kings (complete list) –
part of the Habsburg monarchy, also part of the Lands of the Hungarian Crown

House of Habsburg
- Ferdinand I, King (1526–1564)
- Maximilian, King (1564–1576)
- Rudolph, King (1576–1608)

- Republic of Ragusa (complete list) –

- Džono Andra Bobali and Simo Benessa, Rector (1500–1501)
- Brno Bona, Rector (1501–1502)
- Džono Andra Bobali and Simo Benessa, Rector (1503–1504)
- Frano Andra Bobali, Rector (1505–1506)
- Džono Andra Bobali, Rector (1506–1507)
- Luko Bona and Antun Bona, Rector (1509–1510)
- Antun Bona, Rector (1511–1512)
- Antun Bona, Rector (1514–1515)
- Antun Bona, Rector (1517–1518)
- Antun Bona, Rector (1520–1521)
- Jako Bona, Rector (1521–1522)
- Baro Bona, Rector (1522–1523)
- Antun Bona and Jako Bona, Rector (1523–1524)
- Lujo Bona and Baro Bona, Rector (1525–1526)
- Antun Bona and Jako Bona, Rector (1526–1527)
- Lujo Bona, Rector (1527–1528)
- Mato Frana Bobali, Rector (1528–1529)
- Lujo Bona and Frano Bona, Rector (1529–1530)
- Miho Džona Bobali and Jako Bona, Rector (1530–1531)
- Damjan Benessa and Frano Bona, Rector (1531–1532)
- Lujo Bona and Jako Bona, Rector (1532–1533)
- Damjan Benessa, Mato Frana Bobali, Lujo Bona, and Frano Bona, Rector (1534–1535)
- Župan Bona and Jero Bona, Rector (1535–1536)
- Miho Sima Bobali and Frano Bona, Rector (1536–1537)
- Damjan Benessa and Mato Frana Bobali, Rector (1537–1538)
- Frano Bona, Ilija Bona and Jero Bona, Rector (1538–1539)
- Mato Frana Bobali and Miho Sima Bobali, Rector (1539–1540)
- Miho Džona Bobali, Rector (1542–1543)
- Mato Frana Bobali, Rector (1543–1544)
- Miho Sima Bobali, Rector (1545–1546)
- Mato Frana Bobali and Brno Bona, Rector (1546–1547)
- Župan Bona, Rector (1547–1548)
- Mato Frana Bobali, Rector (1549)
- Pasko Frana Cerve, Rector (1549–?)
- Župan Bona, Rector (?–1555)
- Jero Šiška Bobali, Rector (?–1559)
- Džono Miha Bobali, Rector (1559)
- Luco Bona, Rector (1559–1560)
- Džono Miha Bobali and Lovrijenac Miha Bobali, Rector (1561–1562)
- Simo Bobali, Rector (1562–1563)
- Lovrijenac Miha Bobali, Rector (1564–1565)
- Džono Miha Bobali, Rector (1565)
- Nikola Vitov Gučetić, Rector (1567–1568)
- Džono Miha Bobali, Rector (1568–1569)
- Nikola Vitov Gučetić, Rector (1569–1570)
- Lovrijenac Miha Bobali, Rector (1570)
- Jako Antuna Benesse, Rector (1570–1571)
- Džono Miha Bobali, Rector (1571–1572)
- Jako Antuna Benesse, Rector (1572–1573)
- Džono Miha Bobali, Rector (1573–1575)
- Jako Antuna Benesse, Rector (1575)
- Nikola Vitov Gučetić, Đuro Menze, Rector (1575–1576)
- Antun Bona, Jero Ghetaldi, Rector (1576–1577)
- Božo Proculo, Rector (1577–1578)
- Jako Antuna Benesse, Rector (1578–1579)
- Antun Bona, Vlađ Menze, Rector (1579–1580)
- Luco Bona, Rector (1580)
- Trojan Cerva, Rector (1581)
- Miho Bona, Rector (1582)
- Trojan Cerva, Rector (1584)
- Niko Giorgi, Rector (1586)
- Đivo Binciola, Rector (1587–1588)
- Mato Benessa, Pijero Benessa, Lujo Saraca, Pijero Cerva, Rector (1588–1589)
- Jero Bucchia, Rector (1591)
- Lujo Saraca, Rector (1592)
- Andro Luccari, Rector (1600)

=== Europe: British Isles ===
England and Ireland

- Kingdom of England and Lordship/ Kingdom of Ireland (complete list) –

- Henry VII, King and Lord (1485–1509)
- Henry VIII, King of England (1509–1547), Lord of Ireland (1509–1542), King of Ireland (1542–1547)
- Edward VI, King (1547–1553)
- Lady Jane Grey, Queen (1553) - disputed
- Mary I, Queen (1553–1558)
- Elizabeth I, Queen (1558–1603)

Scotland

- Kingdom of Scotland (complete list) –

- James IV, King (1488–1513)
- James V, King (1513–1542)
- Mary I, Queen (1542–1567)
- James VI, King of Scotland (1567–1625)

Ireland

- Airgíalla (complete list) –

- Rossa mac Maghnusa, King (1497–1513)
- Reamonn mac Glaisne, King (1513–1521)
- Glaisne Óg mac Reamoinn, King (1521–1551?)
- Art Maol mac Reamoinn, King (1551–1560)
- Aodh mac Briain, King (1560–1562)
- Art Ruadh mac Briain, King (1562–1578)
- Sir Rossa Buidhe mac Airt, King (1579–1589)
- Hugh Roe McMahon, King (1589–1590)

- East Breifne (complete list) –

- John, son of Cathal O'Reilly, ruler (1491–1510)
- Hugh, ruler (1514)
- Owen, ruler (1526)
- Farrell, ruler (1526–1536)
- Maelmordha, ruler (1537–1565)
- Hugh Conallagh O'Reilly, ruler (1583)
- John Roe, ruler (1583–1596)
- Philip, ruler (1596–1596)
- Edmond, ruler (1596–1601)

- West Breifne (complete list) –

- Eóghan Ó Ruairc, King (1500–1528)
- Feidhlimidh Ó Ruairc, King (1528–1536)
- Brian ballach mór Ó Ruairc, King (1528–1559, 1560–1562)
- Tadhg Ó Ruairc, King (1559–1560)
- Aodh gallda Ó Ruairc, King (1562–1564)
- Aodh buidhe Ó Ruairc, King (1564–1566)
- Brian O'Rourke, King (1566–1591)
- Brian Oge O'Rourke, King (1591–1600)
- Tadhg Ó Ruairc, Lord (1600–1605)

- Leinster (complete list) –

- Muircheartach mac Donnchadh mac Murchadha Caomhánach, King (1478–1512)
- Art Buidhe mac Murchadha Caomhánach, King (1512–1517)
- Gerald mac Murchadha Caomhánach, King (1517–1523)
- Muiris mac Domhnall Riabhach mac Murchadha Caomhánach, King (1523–1531)
- Muircheartach mac Art Buidhe mac Murchadha Caomhánach, King (1531–1547)
- Muiris mac Domhnall Riabhach mac Murchadha Caomhánach, King (1523–1531)
- Murchadh mac Murchadha Caomhánach, King (1531–1557)
- Criomthann mac Murchadha Caomhánach, King (1557–1582)
- Domhnall Spáinneach mac Murchadha Caomhánach, King (1582–1603)

- Magh Luirg (complete list) –

- Cormac mac Diarmata, King (1499–1528)
- Dermot an Einigh mac Diarmata, King (1528–1533)
- Eoghan mac Diarmata, King (1533–1534)
- Aedh na Ab mac Diarmata, King (1534–1549)
- Ruaidri mac Diarmata, King (1549–1568)
- Turlough mac Diarmata, King (1568–1576)
- Tadhg mac Diarmata, King (1576–1585)

- Síol Anmchadha (complete list) –

- Breasal Ó Madadhan, Lord (c.1479–1526)
- Domhnall Ó Madadhan, Lord (1567–1612)

=== Europe: Central ===
- Holy Roman Empire, Kingdom of Germany

- Emperors Elect, Kings –

- Maximilian I, Emperor Elect (1508–1519), King (1486–1519)
- Charles V, Holy Roman Emperor (1530–1556), King (1519–1556)
- Ferdinand I, Emperor Elect (1558–1564), King (1531–1564)
- Maximilian II, Emperor Elect (1564–1576), King (1562–1576)
- Rudolph II, Emperor Elect (1576–1612), King (1575–1612)

- Reichsvizekanzlers: Vice Chancellors –

- Balthasar Merklin, Vice Chancellor (1527–1531)
- Matthias von Held, Vice Chancellor (1531–1541)
- Johann von Naves, Vice Chancellor (1541–1547)
- Jakob von Jonas, Vice Chancellor (1547–1558)
- Georg Sigmund Seld, Vice Chancellor (1559–1563)
- Johann Ulrich Zasius, Vice Chancellor (1566–1570)
- Siegmund Vieheuser, Vice Chancellor (1577–1587)
- Jacob Kurz von Senftenau, Vice Chancellor (1587–1594)
- Johann Wolfgang Freymann, Vice Chancellor (1594–1597)
- Rudolf Coraduz von und zu Nußdorf, Vice Chancellor (1597–1606)

Austria

- Habsburg monarchy (complete list) –

Habsburg monarchs ruled under numerous simultaneous titles

- Maximilian I, (1493–1519)
- Charles V, (1519–1556)
- Ferdinand I, (1556–1564)
- Maximilian II, (1564–1576)
- Rudolf II, (1576–1612)

Hungary

- Kingdom of Hungary (1301–1526) (complete list) –

- Vladislaus II, King (1490–1516)
- Louis II, King (1516–1526)

- Eastern Hungarian Kingdom (complete list) –

- John Zápolya, King (1526–1540)
- John Sigismund, King (1540–1570)

- Royal Hungary (complete list) –

- Ferdinand I, King (1526–1564)
- Maximilian, King (1564–1576)

- Kingdom of Hungary (1526–1867) (complete list) –

- Rudolph, King (1576–1608)

Poland

- Kingdom of Poland (complete list) –

- John I Albert, King (1492–1501)
- Alexander, King (1501–1506), Grand Duke (1492–1506)
- Sigismund I the Old, King (1506–1548), Grand Duke (1506–1548)
- Sigismund II Augustus, King (1530–1572), Grand Duke (1530–1572)

- Polish–Lithuanian Commonwealth: Kingdom of Poland (complete list) –

- Sigismund II Augustus, King and Grand Duke (1530–1572)
- Henry of Valois, King and Grand Duke (1573–1575)
- Anna Jagiellon, Queen and Grand Duchess (1575–1586)
- Stephen Báthory, King and Grand Duke (1576–1586)
- Sigismund III Vasa, King and Grand Duke (1587–1632)

- State of the Teutonic Order (complete list) –

- Frederick, Duke of Saxony, Grand Master (1497–1510)
- Albert, Grand Master (1510–1525), Duke (1525–1568)

- Duchy of Prussia (complete list) –

- Albert, Grand Master (1510–1525), Duke (1525–1568)
- Albert Frederick, Duke (1568–1618)

=== Europe: East ===
- Crimean Khanate (complete list) –

- Meñli I Giray, Khan (1478–1515)
- Mehmed I Giray, Khan (1515–1523)
- Ğazı I Giray, Khan (1523–1524)
- Saadet I Girai, Khan (1524–1532)
- İslâm I Giray, Khan (1532)
- Sahib I Giray, Khan (1532–1551)
- Devlet I Giray, Khan (1551–1577)
- Mehmed II Giray, Khan (1577–1584)
- Saadet II Giray, Khan (1584)
- İslâm II Giray, Khan (1584–1588)
- Ğazı II Giray, Khan (1588–1596)
- Fetih I Giray, Khan (1596)
- Ğazı II Giray, Khan (1596–1607)

- Khanate of Kazan (complete list) –

- Ghabdellatif, Khan (1496–1502)
- Möxämmädämin, Khan (1484–1485, 1487–1495, 1502–1518)
- Shahghali, Khan (1518–1521, 1546, 1551–1552)
- Sahib I Giray, Khan (1521–1525)
- Safa Giray, Khan (1525–1532, 1535–1546, 1546–1549)
- Canghali, Khan (1532–1535)
- Utameshgaray, Khan (1549–1551)
- Yadegar Mokhammad, Khan (1552)

- Polish–Lithuanian Commonwealth: Grand Duchy of Lithuania (complete list) –

- Sigismund II Augustus, King and Grand Duke (1530–1572)
- Henry of Valois, King and Grand Duke (1573–1575)
- Anna Jagiellon, Queen and Grand Duchess (1575–1586)
- Stephen Báthory, King and Grand Duke (1576–1586)
- Sigismund III Vasa, King and Grand Duke (1587–1632)

- Moldavia (complete list) –

- Ștefan III the Great, Voivode (1457–1504)
- Bogdan III The One-Eyed, Voivode (1504–1517)
- Luca Arbore, Regent (1517–1523)
- Ștefan IV the Younger, Voivode (1523–1527)
- Petru V Rareș, Voivode (1527–1538, 1541–1546)
- Ștefan V Lăcustă, Voivode (1538–1540)
- Alexandru III the Evil, Voivode (1540–1541)
- Ilie II Rareș, Voivode (1546–1551)
- Ștefan VI Rareș, Voivode (1551–1552)
- Ioan Joldea, Voivode (1552)
- Alexandru IV Lăpușneanu, Voivode (1552–1561, 1564–1568)
- Ioan II Iacob Heraclid, Voivode (1561–1563)
- Ștefan VII Tomșa, Voivode (1563–1564)
- Ruxandra of Moldavia, Regent (1568–1570)
- Bogdan IV, Voivode (1570–1572)
- Ioan III the Terrible, Voivode (1572–1574)
- Petru VI the Lame, Voivode (1574–1577, 1578–1579, 1582–1591)
- Ioan IV Potcoavă, Voivode (1577)
- Ioan V the Saxon, Voivode (1579–1582)
- Aaron I the Tyrant, Voivode (1591–1592, 1592–1595)
- Alexandru V the Wrongdoer, Voivode (1592)
- Petru VII the Cossack, Voivode (1592)
- Ștefan VIII Răzvan, Voivode (1595)
- Ieremia Movilă, Voivode (1595–1600, 1600–1606)
- Mihail I Viteazul, Voivode (1600)

- Grand Duchy of Moscow (complete list) –

- Ivan III the Great, Grand prince (1462–1505)
- Vasily III, Grand prince (1505–1533)
- Ivan IV the Terrible, Grand prince (1533–1547), Tsar (1547–1584)

- Qasim Khanate (complete list) –

- Satylghan ibn Nur Daulat, Sultan (1491–1506)
- Janai ibn Nur Daulat, Sultan (1506–1512)
- Shaykh Allahyar, Khan (1512–1516)
- Shahghali, Khan (1516–1519)
- Canghali of Kazan, Khan (1519–1531)
- Shahghali, Khan (1535–1567)
- Simeon Bekbulatovich, Khan (1567–1573)
- Mustafa Ali Khan, Khan (1584–1590)
- Eid al-Muhammad, Khan (1600–1610)

- Tsardom of Russia (complete list) –

- Ivan IV the Terrible, Grand prince (1533–1547), Tsar (1547–1584)
- Feodor I, Tsar (1584–1598)
- Boris Godunov, Tsar (1598–1605)

- Principality of Transylvania (1570–1711) (complete list) –

- John Sigismund Zápolya, Prince (1570–1571)
- Stephen Báthory, Prince (1576–1586)
- Sigismund Báthory, Prince (1586–1598, 1598–1599, 1601–1602)
- Imperial commissioners, (1598)
- Andrew Báthory, Prince (1599)
- Michael the Brave of Wallachia, imperial governor (1599–1600)
- Giorgio Basta, commissioner (1600–1601, 1601–1603)

- Principality of Wallachia (complete list) –

- Radu IV the Great, Prince (1495–1508)
- Mihnea I the Bad, Prince (1508–1509)
- Mircea III (IV) Miloș, Prince (1509–1510)
- Vlad V the Younger, Prince (1510–1512)
- Neagoe Basarab V, Prince (1512–1521)
- Milica of Serbia, Regent
- Branković/ Craiovești, Regent (1521–1522)
- Milica Despina, Regent (1521–1522)
- Teodosie of Wallachia, Prince (1521–1522)
- Radu V, Prince (1522–1523, 1524, 1524–1525, 1525–1529)
- Vladislav III, Prince (1523, 1524, 1525)
- Radu VI Bădica, Prince (1523–1524)
- Basarab VI, Prince (1529)
- Moise, Prince (1529–1530)
- Vlad VI the Drowned, Prince (1530–1532)
- Vlad VII Vintilă de la Slatina, Prince (1532–1535)
- Radu VII Paisie, Prince (1535–1545)
- Mircea IV the Shepherd, Prince (1545–1552, 1553–1554, 1558–1559)
- Radu VIII Ilie the Cowherd, Prince (1552–1553)
- Pătrașcu the Good, Prince (1554–1558)
- Chiajna of Moldavia, Regent (1559–1564)
- Petru I the Younger, Prince (1564–1568)
- Alexandru II Mircea, Prince (1568–1574, 1574–1577)
- Vintilă, Prince (1574)
- Catherine Salvaresso, Regent (1577–1583)
- Petru II of the Earring, Prince (1583–1585)
- Mihnea II the Turk (Mihnea Turcitul), Prince (1585–1591)
- Ștefan I Surdul, Prince (1591–1592)
- Alexandru III cel Rău, Prince (1592–1593)
- Mihail II Viteazul, Prince (1593–1600)
- Nicolae Pătrașcu, Prince (1599–1600)
- Simion Movilă, Prince (1600–1601, 1602)

=== Europe: Nordic ===
Kalmar Union

- Kalmar Union of Denmark, Sweden, and Norway (complete list, complete list, complete list) –

- John, King of Denmark (1481–1513), of Norway (1483–1513), of Sweden (1497–1501)
- Sten Sture the Elder, Regent of Sweden (1470–1497, 1501–1503)
- Svante Nilsson, Regent of Sweden (1504–1512)
- Eric Trolle, Regent of Sweden (1512)
- Sten Sture the Younger, Regent of Sweden (1512–1520)
- Christian II, King of Denmark and Norway (1513–1523), of Sweden (1520–1521)

Denmark–Norway

- Denmark–Norway (complete list / complete list) –

- Frederick I, King (1523–1533)
- Olav Engelbrektsson, Regent of Norway (1533–1537)
- Christian III, King (1533–1559)
- Frederick II, King (1559–1588)
- Christian IV, King (1588–1648)

- Duchy of Schleswig (complete list) –

- John, King of Denmark, Duke (1482–1513)
- Frederick I of Denmark, Duke (1490–1533)
- Christian II of Denmark, Duke (1513–1523)
- Christian III of Denmark, Duke (1523–1559)
- Adolf, Duke of Holstein-Gottorp, Duke (1544–1586)
- John II, Duke of Schleswig-Holstein-Haderslev, Duke (1544–1580)
- Frederick II of Denmark, Duke (1559–1588)
- Frederick II, Duke of Holstein-Gottorp, Duke (1586–1587)
- Philip, Duke of Holstein-Gottorp, Duke (1587–1590)
- Christian IV of Denmark, Duke (1588–1648)

Sweden

- History of Sweden (1523–1611) (complete list) –

- Gustav I, King (1523–1560)
- Eric XIV, King (1560–1568)
- John III, King (1568–1592)
- Sigismund, King (1592–1599)
- Charles IX, Regent (1599–1604), King (1604–1611)

=== Europe: Southcentral ===
States of Italy in 1494.

- Kingdom of Italy (Holy Roman Empire) (complete list) –

- Charles V, King (1530–1556)

- Republic of Florence (complete list) –

- Piero Soderini, de facto ruler (1502–1512)
- Giovanni (Leo X), Lord (1512–1513)
- Giuliano, Lord (1513–1516)
- Lorenzo II, Lord (1516–1519)
- Giulio (Clement VII), Lord (1519–1523)
- Ippolito, Lord (1523–1527)
- Alessandro the Moor, Lord (1527–1532), Duke (1532–1537)
- Cosimo I, Duke (1537–1569), Grand Duke (1569–1574)

- Margraviate / Duchy of Mantua (complete list) –

- Francis II, Marquess (1484–1519)
- Federico II, Marquess (1519–1530), Duke (1530–1540)
- Francesco III, Duke (1540–1550)
- Guglielmo, Duke (1550–1587)
- Vincenzo, Duke (1587–1612)

- Margraviate/Principality of Massa and Margraviate of Carrara (complete list) –

- Alberico II Malaspina, Marquis (1481–1519)
- Ricciarda Malaspina, Marquis (1519–1546, 1547–1553)
- Giulio I Cybo-Malaspina, Marquis (1546–1547)
- Alberico I Cybo-Malaspina, Marquis (1554–1623), Prince and Marquis (1558–1623)

- Duchy of Modena, Reggio, and Ferrara (complete list) –

- Ercole I, Duke (1471–1505)
- Alfonso I, Duke (1505–1534)
- Ercole II, Duke (1534–1559)
- Alfonso II, Duke (1559–1597)

- March / Duchy of Montferrat (complete list) –

- William IX, Marquis (1494–1518)
- Anne of Alençon, Regent (1518–1530) for Boniface IV, Marquis (1518–1530)
- John George, Marquis (1530–1533)
- Spanish occupation, 1533–1536.
- Frederick Gonzaga, Marquis (1536–1540)
- Francis I, Marquis (1540–1550)
- Guglielmo Gonzaga, Marquis (1550–1574), Duke (1574–1574)
- Vincent I, Duke (1587–1612)

- Papal States (complete list) –

- Alexander VI, Pope (1492–1503)
- Pius III, Pope (1503)
- Julius II, Pope (1503–1513)
- Leo X, Pope (1513–1521)
- Adrian VI, Pope (1522–1523)
- Clement VII, Pope (1523–1534)
- Paul III, Pope (1534–1549)
- Julius III, Pope (1550–1555)
- Marcellus II, Pope (1555)
- Paul IV, Pope (1555–1559)
- Pius IV, Pope (1559–1565)
- Pius V, Pope (1566–1572)
- Gregory XIII, Pope (1572–1585)
- Sixtus V, Pope (1585–1590)
- Urban VII, Pope (1590)
- Gregory XIV, Pope (1590–1591)
- Innocent IX, Pope (1591)
- Clement VIII, Pope (1592–1605)

- Duchy of Parma (complete list) –

- Pier Luigi, Duke (1545–1547)
- Ottavio, Duke (1556–1586)
- Alexander, Duke (1586–1592)
- Ranuccio I, Duke (1592–1622)

- San Marino

- Captains Regent (1500–1700) –

- Francesco di Girolamo Belluzzi, Simone di Antonio Belluzzi, Captains Regent (1500–1501)
- Antonio di Polinoro Lunardini, Fabrizio di Pier Leone Corbelli, Captains Regent (1501)
- Cristoforo di Giacomino di Bartolo, Biagio di Bartolo Pasini, Captains Regent (1501–1502)
- Antonio di Girolamo, Gabriele di Bartolo, Captains Regent (1502)
- Giuliano di Bartolomeo, Angelo di Paolo Fabbri, Captains Regent (1502–1503)
- Antonio di Bianco, Bartolo di Antonio, Captains Regent (1503)
- Simone di Antonio Belluzzi, Giovanni di Cristoforo di Vita, Captains Regent (1503)
- Francesco di Girolamo, Bonifazio di Andrea, Captains Regent (1503–1504)
- Fabrizio di Pier Leone Corbelli, Marino di Niccolò di Giovanetto, Captains Regent (1504)
- Antonio di Girolamo, Francesco di Marino Giangi, Captains Regent (1504–1505)
- Francesco di Girolamo Belluzzi, Giuliano di Bartolomeo, Captains Regent (1505)
- Antonio di Bianco, Antonio di Marino Giannini, Captains Regent (1505–1506)
- Andrea di Giorgio Loli, Camillo di Menetto Bonelli, Captains Regent (1506)
- Antonio di Polinoro Lunardini, Antonio di Maurizio Lunardini, Captains Regent (1506–1507)
- Fabrizio di Pier Leone Corbelli, Sammaritano di Andrea Tini, Captains Regent (1507)
- Marino di Niccolò di Giovanetto, Leonardo di Giovanni di Belluzzi, Captains Regent (1507–1508)
- Cristoforo Martelli, Giacomo di Lodovico Calcigni, Captains Regent (1508)
- Antonio di Girolamo, Francesco di Marino Giangi, Captains Regent (1508–1509)
- Innocenzo di Menetto Bonelli, Antonio di Benetto, Captains Regent (1509)
- Andrea di Giorgio Loli, Antonio di Marino Giannini, Captains Regent (1509–1510)
- Antonio di Polinoro Lunardini, Andrea di Marino Speranza, Captains Regent (1510)
- Antonio di Bianco, Barnaba di Matteo da Valle, Captains Regent (1510–1511)
- Marino di Niccolò di Giovanetto, Biagio di Bartolo Pasini, Captains Regent (1511)
- Antonio di Girolamo, Giovanni di Cristoforo Vita, Captains Regent (1511–1512)
- Andrea Giangi, Marino di Severo, Captains Regent (1512)
- Leonardo di Giovanni Belluzzi, Sammaritano di Andrea Tini, Captains Regent (1512–1513)
- Cristoforo di Girolamo, Cristoforo Martelli, Captains Regent (1513)
- Antonio di Benetto, Benedetto di Marino Benettini, Captains Regent (1513–1514)
- Antonio di Maurizio Lunardini, Francesco Giangi, Captains Regent (1514)
- Francesco di Simone Belluzzi, Innocenzo di Menetto Bonelli, Captains Regent (1514–1515)
- Carlo di Cristofaro, Giacomo di Lodovico Calcigni, Captains Regent (1515)
- Francesco di Girolamo Belluzzi, Antonio di Bartolo, Captains Regent (1515–1516)
- Camillo di Menetto Bonelli, Girolamo di Giuliano Gozi, Captains Regent (1516)
- Diotallevo Corbelli, Sammaritano di Andrea Tini, Captains Regent (1516–1517)
- Carlo di Cristofaro, Giacomo di Lodovico Calcigni, Captains Regent (1517)
- Andrea di Bonifazio, Antonio di Maurizio Lunardini, Captains Regent (1517–1518)
- Camillo di Menetto Bonelli, Leonardo di Giovanni Belluzzi, Captains Regent (1518)
- Francesco di Girolamo Belluzzi, Antonio di Polinoro Lunardini, Captains Regent (1518–1519)
- Girolamo di Giuliano Gozi, Pietro di Sabatino di Bianco, Captains Regent (1519)
- Innocenzo di Menetto Bonelli, Francesco di Antonio Belluzzi, Captains Regent (1519–1520)
- Antonio di Maurizio Lunardini, Marino di Severo, Captains Regent (1520)
- Andrea di Bonifazio, Francesco di Girolamo Belluzzi, Captains Regent (1520–1521)
- Bartolomeo di Antonio Amanti, Bartolo di Simone Belluzzi, Captains Regent (1521)
- Cristofaro Martelli, Giacomo di Lodovico Calcigni, Captains Regent (1521–1522)
- Girolamo di Giuliano Gozi, Giuliano di Bartolomeo, Captains Regent (1522)
- Antonio di Polinoro Lunardini, Marino di Antonio, Captains Regent (1522–1523)
- Bartolomeo di Antonio, Girolamo di Evangelista Belluzzi, Captains Regent (1523)
- Francesco di Simone Belluzzi, Francesco di Sante di Biagio, Captains Regent (1523–1524)
- Camillo di Menetto Bonelli, Leonardo di Giovanni Belluzzi, Captains Regent (1524)
- Giacomo di Antonio Giannini, Bartolomeo di Antonio Amanti, Captains Regent (1524–1525)
- Innocenzo di Menetto Bonelli, Pier Leone di Fabrizio Corbelli, Captains Regent (1525)
- Melchiorre di Francesco Belluzzi, Sammaritano di Andrea Tini, Captains Regent (1525–1526)
- Girolamo di Giuliano Gozi, Federigo di Brandano Calcigni, Captains Regent (1526)
- Francesco di Simone Belluzzi, Marino di Severo, Captains Regent (1526–1527)
- Andrea Sabbatini, Carlo di Cristofaro, Captains Regent (1527)
- Bartolomeo di Antonio Amanti, Giacomo di Lodovico Calcigni, Captains Regent (1527–1528)
- Melchiorre di Francesco, Diottalevo Corbelli, Giuliano di Marino Righi, Captains Regent (1528)
- Girolamo di Giuliano Gozi, Girolamo di Evangelista Belluzzi, Captains Regent (1528–1529)
- Camillo di Menetto Bonelli, Bartolo Belluzzi, Captains Regent (1529)
- Lodovico di Pietro Calcigni, Antonio di Pietro Tosini, Captains Regent (1529–1530)
- Melchiorre di Francesco Belluzzi, Giacomo di Lodovico Pinti, Captains Regent (1530)
- Giacomo di Lodovico Calcigni, Pier Leone di Fabrizio Corbelli, Captains Regent (1530–1531)
- Francesco di Simone Belluzzi, Giacomo di Antonio Giannini, Captains Regent (1531)
- Polinoro di Antonio Lunardini, Girolamo di Giuliano Gozi, Captains Regent (1531–1532)
- Carlo di Cristofaro, Innocenzo di Menetto Bonelli, Captains Regent (1532)
- Bartolo di Simone Belluzzi, Sammaritano di Andrea Tini, Captains Regent (1532–1533)
- Giacomo di Lodovico Calcigni, Girolamo di Evangelista Belluzzi, Captains Regent (1533)
- Camillo di Menetto Bonelli, Melchiorre di Francesco Belluzzi, Captains Regent (1533–1534)
- Pier Leone di Fabrizio Corbelli, Giuliano di Marino Righi, Captains Regent (1534)
- Francesco di Simone Belluzzi, Giacomo di Antonio Giannini, Captains Regent (1534–1535)
- Girolamo di Giuliano Gozi, Antonio di Pietro Tontini, Captains Regent (1535)
- Innocenzo di Menetto Bonelli, Giacomo di Evangelista Belluzzi, Captains Regent (1535–1536)
- Melchiorre di Francesco Belluzzi, Sammaritano di Andrea Tini, Captains Regent (1536)
- Bartolo di Simone Belluzzi, Pier Leone di Fabrizio Corbelli, Captains Regent (1536–1537)
- Girolamo di Evangelista Belluzzi, Girolamo di Francesco Giannini, Captains Regent (1537)
- Giuliano di Marino Righi, Giacomo di Antonio Giannini, Captains Regent (1537–1538)
- Francesco di Simone Belluzzi, Girolamo di Giuliano Gozi, Captains Regent (1538)
- Carlo di Cristofaro Gianolini, Cristofaro di Marino Giangi, Captains Regent (1538–1539)
- Melchiorre di Francesco Belluzzi, Niccolò di Sante di Biagio, Captains Regent (1539)
- Bartolo di Simone Belluzzi, Giacomo di Antonio Giannini, Captains Regent (1539–1540)
- Gio. Antonio di Francesco Belluzzi, Pier Leone di Fabrizio Corbelli, Captains Regent (1540)
- Girolamo di Giuliano Gozi, Vincenzo di Bartolo Gombertini, Captains Regent (1540–1541)
- Girolamo di Evangelista Belluzzi, Stanghelino di Francesco Belluzzi, Captains Regent (1541)
- Giuliano di Marino Righi, Giacomo di Lodovico Pinti, Captains Regent (1541–1542)
- Polinoro Lunardini, Cristofaro di Marino Giangi, Captains Regent (1542)
- Carlo Gianolini, Marino Gabrielli, Captains Regent (1542–1543)
- Antonio di Pietro Tontini, Giacomo di Evangelista Belluzzi, Captains Regent (1543)
- Girolamo Giannini, Carlo di Francesco Lunardini, Captains Regent (1543–1544)
- Polinoro Lunardini, Bartolo di Simone Belluzzi, Captains Regent (1544)
- Giovanni Antonio Belluzzi, Vincenzo Gombertini, Captains Regent (1544–1545)
- Girolamo di Giuliano Gozi, Innocenzo Brancuti, Captains Regent (1545)
- Giuliano di Marino Righi, Marino Gabrielli, Captains Regent (1545–1546)
- Bonetto di Marino Bonetti, Baldo di Gaspare, Captains Regent (1546)
- Pier Leone di Fabrizio Corbelli, Bernardino Giannini, Captains Regent (1546–1547)
- Gio. Antonio Leonardelli, Stanghelino di Francesco Belluzzi, Captains Regent (1547)
- Gio. Lodovico di Matteo Belluzzi, Pier Paolo Bonelli, Captains Regent (1547–1548)
- Bartolo Belluzzi, Giovanni Antonio Belluzzi, Sante di Marco Gori, Captains Regent (1548)
- Giacomo di Antonio Giannini, Francesco di Sebastiano Onofri, Captains Regent (1548–1549)
- Giuliano di Marino Righi, Girolamo di Evangelista Belluzzi, Captains Regent (1549)
- Bartolo Belluzzi, Rinaldo di Giovanni Baldi, Captains Regent (1549–1550)
- Polinoro Lunardini, Biagio di Matteo Tura, Captains Regent (1550)
- Gio. Antonio Leonardelli, Cristofaro di Marino Giangi, Captains Regent (1550–1551)
- Girolamo Giannini, Marino di Andrea, Captains Regent (1551)
- Pier Leone Corbelli, Pier Matteo Belluzzi, Captains Regent (1551–1552)
- Gio. Lodovico di Matteo Belluzzi, Baldo di Gaspare, Captains Regent (1552)
- Antonio di Piero Tontini, Vincenzo di Giovanni di Andrea, Captains Regent (1552–1553)
- Vincenzo Gombertini, Giacomo di Antonio Giannini, Captains Regent (1553)
- Gio. Antonio Belluzzi, Rinaldo di Giovanni Baldi, Captains Regent (1553–1554)
- Innocenzo Brancuti, Giacomo di Evangelista Belluzzi, Captains Regent (1554)
- Marc'Antonio Gozi, Francesco di Sebastiano Onofri, Captains Regent (1554–1555)
- Giuliano di Marino Righi, Gio. Antonio di Antonio, Captains Regent (1555)
- Bartolo Belluzzi, Pier Paolo Corbelli, Captains Regent (1555–1556)
- Gio. Antonio Leonardelli, Bonetto di Marino Bonetti, Captains Regent (1556)
- Antonio Brancuti, Baldo di Gaspare, Captains Regent (1556–1557)
- Gio. Lodovico di Matteo Belluzzi, Vincenzo Giannini, Captains Regent (1557)
- Pier Paolo Bonelli, Vincenzo Gombertini, Captains Regent (1557–1558)
- Girolamo Giannini, Francesco di Sebastiano Onofri, Captains Regent (1558)
- Innocenzo Brancuti, Rinaldo di Giovanni Baldi, Captains Regent (1558–1559)
- Bartolo Belluzzi, Pier Paolo Corbelli, Captains Regent (1559)
- Gio. Antonio Leonardelli, Sinibaldo Sinibaldi, Captains Regent (1559–1560)
- Giacomo di Evangelista Belluzzi, Vincenzo di Marino di Andrea, Captains Regent (1560)
- Pier Leone Corbelli, Giovanni Sinibaldi, Captains Regent (1560–1561)
- Vincenzo Gombertini, Bernardino Giannini, Captains Regent (1561)
- Francesco di Sebastiano Onofri, Francesco di Pier Paolo Martelli, Captains Regent (1561–1562)
- Girolamo Giannini, Claudio Belluzzi, Captains Regent (1562)
- Pier Paolo Bonelli, Marc'Antonio Gozi, Captains Regent (1562–1563)
- Pier Matteo Belluzzi, Pier Paolo Corbelli, Captains Regent (1563)
- Ludovico Belluzzi, Marc'Antonio Bonetti, Captains Regent (1563–1564)
- Gio. Andrea Belluzzi, Rinaldo di Giovanni Baldi, Captains Regent (1564)
- Antonio Brancuti, Benedetto di Bianco, Captains Regent (1564–1565)
- Vincenzo Gombertini, Giacomo di Evangelista Belluzzi, Captains Regent (1565)
- Bonetto di Marino Bonetti, Marino Bonelli, Captains Regent (1565–1566)
- Marc'Antonio Gozi, Giovanni Antonio di Antonio, Captains Regent (1566)
- Girolamo Giannini, Sebastiano di Cristofaro Giangi, Captains Regent (1566–1567)
- Francesco di Pier Paolo Martelli, Marino di Cristofaro Giangi, Captains Regent (1567)
- Giuliano Corbelli, Giovanni Andrea Belluzzi, Captains Regent (1567–1568)
- Pier Paolo Bonelli, Pier Paolo Corbelli, Captains Regent (1568)
- Antonio Brancuti, Liberio Gabrielli, Captains Regent (1568–1569)
- Pier Matteo Belluzzi, Vincenzo Giannini, Captains Regent (1569)
- Ippolito Gombertini, Sinibaldo Sinibaldi, Captains Regent (1569–1570)
- Marc'Antonio Gozi, Marc'Antonio Bonetti, Captains Regent (1570)
- Girolamo Giannini, Ascanio di Giacomo Belluzzi, Captains Regent (1570–1571)
- Giovanni Antonio Leonardelli, Benedetto di Bianco, Captains Regent (1571)
- Pier Paolo Corbelli, Giovanni Paolo di Giuliano, Captains Regent (1571–1572)
- Innocenzo Brancuti, Francesco Giannini, Captains Regent (1572)
- Pier Matteo Belluzzi, Antonio di Angelo Bellini, Captains Regent (1572–1573)
- Antonio Brancuti, Gio. Lodovico di Matteo Belluzzi, Captains Regent (1573)
- Lodovico Belluzzi, Vincenzo Giannini, Captains Regent (1573–1574)
- Marc'Antonio Gozi, Gio. Antonio di Antonio, Captains Regent (1574)
- Giambattista Belluzzi, Benedetto di Bianco, Captains Regent (1574–1575)
- Giuliano Corbelli, Liberio Gabrielli, Captains Regent (1575)
- Girolamo Giannini, Vincenzo di Marino di Andrea, Captains Regent (1575–1576)
- Pier Paolo Corbelli, Sinibaldo Sinibaldi, Captains Regent (1576)
- Innocenzo Brancuti, Francesco Onofri, Captains Regent (1576–1577)
- Francesco di Paolo di Giuliano, Gio. Lodovico di Matteo Belluzzi, Captains Regent (1577)
- Pier Matteo Belluzzi, Vincenzo Giannini, Captains Regent (1577–1578)
- Ippolito Gombertini, Francesco Giannini, Captains Regent (1578)
- Liberio Gabrielli, Ascanio Belluzzi, Captains Regent (1578–1579)
- Girolamo Giannini, Benedetto di Bianco, Captains Regent (1579)
- Lodovico Belluzzi, Giovanni Calcigni, Captains Regent (1579–1580)
- Pier Paolo Corbelli, Marino Bonelli, Captains Regent (1580)
- Giambattista Belluzzi, Sinibaldo Sinibaldi, Captains Regent (1580–1581)
- Innocenzo Brancuti, Gio. Lodovico di Matteo Belluzzi, Captains Regent (1581)
- Giuliano Corbelli, Gio. Paolo Belluzzi, Captains Regent (1581–1582)
- Ippolito Gombertini, Pier Marino Cionini, Captains Regent (1582)
- Gio. Antonio Leonardelli, Francesco Giannini, Captains Regent (1582–1583)
- Pier Matteo Belluzzi, Marc'Antonio Gozi, Captains Regent (1583)
- Pier Paolo Corbelli, Francesco Martelli, Captains Regent (1583–1584)
- Federico Sinibaldi, Vincenzo Giannini, Captains Regent (1584)
- Innocenzo Brancuti, Gio. Lodovico Belluzzi, Captains Regent (1584–1585)
- Bonetto Bonetti, Gio. Maria Giangi, Captains Regent (1585)
- Giuliano Corbelli, Liberio Gabrielli, Captains Regent (1585–1586)
- Ascanio Belluzzi, Francesco Giannini, Captains Regent (1586)
- Paol'Antonio Onofri, Giambattista Belluzzi, Captains Regent (1586–1587)
- Lodovico Belluzzi, Pier Marino Cionini, Captains Regent (1587)
- Gio. Antonio Leonardelli, Pier Paolo Corbelli, Captains Regent (1587–1588)
- Pier Matteo Belluzzi, Vincenzo Giannini, Captains Regent (1588)
- Marc'Aurelio Brancuti, Giambattista Belluzzi, Captains Regent (1588–1589)
- Giuliano Corbelli, Liberio Gabrielli, Captains Regent (1589)
- Federico Sinibaldi, Marino Pellicieri, Captains Regent (1589–1590)
- Francesco Giannini, Giambattista Fabbri, Captains Regent (1590)
- Orazio Giannini, Giambattista Belluzzi, Captains Regent (1590–1591)
- Lodovico Belluzzi, Ascanio Belluzzi, Captains Regent (1591)
- Pier Matteo Belluzzi, Ottaviano Gozi, Captains Regent (1591–1592)
- Pier Marino Cionini, Giuliano Gozi, Camillo Bonelli, Captains Regent (1592)
- Giovanni Paolo Belluzzi, Paol'Antonio Onofri, Captains Regent (1592–1593)
- Giuliano Corbelli, Annibale Belluzzi, Captains Regent (1593)
- Giambattista Belluzzi, Francesco Giannini, Captains Regent (1593–1594)
- Liberio Gabrielli, Innocenzo Bonelli, Captains Regent (1594)
- Federico Brandani, Vincenzo Giannini, Captains Regent (1594–1595)
- Fabrizio Belluzzi, Francesco Maria Corbelli, Captains Regent (1595)
- Pier Marino Cionini, Lattanzio Valli, Captains Regent (1595–1596)
- Orazio Belluzzi, Matteo Ceccoli, Captains Regent (1596)
- Camillo Bonelli, Annibale Belluzzi, Captains Regent (1596–1597)
- Paolo Antonio Onofri, Gio. Francesco Belluzzi, Captains Regent (1597)
- Camillo Bonelli, Annibale Belluzzi, Captains Regent (1597–1598)
- Giuliano Gozi, Francesco Giannini, Captains Regent (1598)
- Giambattista Belluzzi, Innocenzo Bonelli, Captains Regent (1598–1599)
- Pier Marino Cionini, Giambattista Fabbri, Captains Regent (1599)
- Orazio Belluzzi, Lattanzio Valli, Captains Regent (1599–1600)
- Pier Francesco Bonetti, Belluzzo Belluzzi, Captains Regent (1600)
- Pier Matteo Belluzzi, Fabrizio Belluzzi, Captains Regent (1600–1601)

- Grand Duchy of Tuscany (complete list) –

- Cosimo I, Duke (1537–1569), Grand Duke (1569–1574)
- Francesco I, Grand Duke (1574–1587)
- Ferdinando I, Grand Duke (1587–1609)

- Republic of Venice (complete list) –

- Agostino Barbarigo, Doge (1486–1501)
- Leonardo Loredan, Doge (1501–1521)
- Antonio Grimani, Doge (1521–1523)
- Andrea Gritti, Doge (1523–1538)
- Pietro Lando, Doge (1538–1545)
- Francesco Donato, Doge (1545–1553)
- Marcantonio Trevisan, Doge (1553–1554)
- Francesco Venier, Doge (1554–1556)
- Lorenzo Priuli, Doge (1556–1559)
- Girolamo Priuli, Doge (1559–1567)
- Pietro Loredan, Doge (1567–1570)
- Alvise I Mocenigo, Doge (1570–1577)
- Sebastiano Venier, Doge (1577–1578)
- Nicolò da Ponte, Doge (1578–1585)
- Pasqual Cicogna, Doge (1585–1595)
- Marino Grimani, Doge (1595–1606)

Southern Italy

- Kingdom of Naples (complete list) –

- Frederick I, King (1496–1501)
- Louis III, King (1501–1504)
- Ferdinand III, King (1504–1516)
- Joanna III, Queen (1516–1555)
- Charles IV, King (1516–1554)
- Philip I, King (1554–1598)
- Philip II, King (1598–1621)

- Kingdom of Trinacria: Sicily (complete list) –

- Ferdinand II, King (1468–1516)
- Joanna, Queen (1516–1555)
- Charles I, King (1516–1556)
- Philip II, King (1554–1598)
- Philip III, King (1598–1621)

Malta

- Hospitaller Malta (complete list) –

- Philippe Villiers de L'Isle-Adam, Grand Master (1521–1534)
- Piero de Ponte, Grand Master (1534–1535)
- Didier de Saint-Jaille, Grand Master (1535–1536)
- Juan de Homedes, Grand Master (1536–1553)
- Claude de la Sengle, Grand Master (1553–1557)
- Jean Parisot de Valette, Grand Master (1557–1568)
- Pierre de Monte, Grand Master (1568–1572)
- Jean de la Cassière, Grand Master (1572–1581)
- Mathurin Romegas, Lieutenant (1577–1581)
- Mathurin Romegas, anti-Grand Master (1581)
- Hugues Loubenx de Verdalle, Grand Master (1581–1595)
- Martín Garzés, Grand Master (1595–1601)

=== Europe: Southwest ===
Andorra

- Andorra

- Episcopal Co-Princes (complete list) –

- Pedro Folc de Cardona / Pere de Cardona, Episcopal Co-Prince (1472–1512, 1513–1515)
- Joan d'Espés, Episcopal Co-Prince (1515–1530)
- Pedro Jordán de Urries, Episcopal Co-Prince (1532–1533)
- Francisco de Urríes, Episcopal Co-Prince (1533–1551)
- Miquel Despuig, Episcopal Co-Prince (1552–1556)
- Juan Pérez Garcia de Oliván, Episcopal Co-Prince (1556–1560)
- Pere de Castellet, Episcopal Co-Prince (1561–1571)
- Joan Dimes Lloris, Episcopal Co-Prince (1571–1576)
- Miquel Jeroni Morell, Episcopal Co-Prince (1578–1579)
- Hug Ambrós de Montcada, Episcopal Co-Prince (1579–1586)
- Andreu Capella, Episcopal Co-Prince (1588–1609)

- French Co-Princes (complete list) –

- Catherine, French Co-Princess (1483–1512, 1513–1517)
- Henry II, French Co-Prince (1517–1555)
- Joan III, French Co-Princess (1555–1572)
- Henry IV, French Co-Prince (1572–1610)

Navarre

- Kingdom of Navarre (complete list) –

- Catherine, Queen (1483–1517)
- John III, King (1484–1516)
- Henry II, King (1517–1555)
- Jeanne III, Queen (1555–1572)
- Antoine, King (1555–1562)
- Henry III, King (1572–1610)

- County of Ribagorza (complete list) –

- John, Count (1485–1512)
- Alfonso, Count (1512–1533)
- Martin, Count (1533–1565, 1573–1581)
- John Alfonso, Count (1565–1573)
- Ferdinand, Count (1581–1592)
- Francis, Count (1592–1598)

Portugal

- Kingdom of Portugal and the Algarves / Portugal (complete list) –

- Manuel I, King (1495–1521)
- John III, King (1521–1557)
- Sebastian I, King (1557–1578)
- Henry I, King (1578–1580)
- Philip I, King (1581–1598)
- Philip II, King (1598–1621)

Spain

- Trastámara Spain: Crown of Castile and Crown of Aragon (complete list, complete list) –

- Isabella I the Catholic, Queen of Castile (1474–1504)
- Ferdinand the Catholic, King of Castile (1474–1504), of Aragon (1479–1516)
- Philip I the Handsome, King of Castile (1506)
- Joanna the Mad, Queen of Castile (1504–1555), of Aragon (1516–1555)
- Charles I, King (1516–1556)

- Habsburg Spain: Crown of Castile and Crown of Aragon

- Monarchs (complete list) –

- Joanna the Mad, Queen (1504–1555)
- Charles I, King (1516–1556)
- Philip II the Prudent, King (1556–1598)
- Philip III the Pious, King (1598–1621)

=== Europe: West ===
France

- Kingdom of France: Ancien Régime (complete list) –

- Louis XII, King (1498–1515)
- Francis I, King (1515–1547)
- Henry II, King (1547–1559)
- Francis II, King (1559–1560)
- Charles IX, King (1560–1574)
- Henry III, King (1574–1589)
- Henry IV, King (1589–1610)

- Anjou (complete list) –

- Louise, Duke (1476–1531)
- Henry II, Duke (1566–1576)

- Auvergne (complete list) –

- John III, Count of Auvergne, Count (1494–1501)
- Anne de La Tour d'Auvergne, Count (1501–1524)
- Catherine de' Medici, Count (1524–1589)
- Charles III, Duke of Lorraine, Count (1589–1608)

- County of Boulogne (complete list) –

- John V, Count (1497–1501)

- Duchy of Brittany (complete list) –

- Anne, Duchess (1488–1514)
- Claude, Duchess (1514–1524)
- Francis III, Duke (1524–1536)
- Henry, Duke (1536–1547)

- County of Maine (complete list) –

- Charles VI of Maine, Count (?–1611)

- Monaco (complete list) –

- Jean II, Lord (1494–1505)
- Lucien, Lord (1505–1523)
- Honoré I, Lord (1523–1581)
- Charles II, Lord (1581–1589)
- Ercole, Lord (1589–1604)

- County / Duchy of Nevers (complete list) –

- Engelbert of Cleves, Count (1491–1506)
- Charles II, Count of Nevers, Count (1506–1521)
- François I, Duke (1521–1562)
- François II, Duke (1562–1563)
- Jacques, Duchess (1563–1564)
- Henriette of Cleves, Duke (1564–1601)
- Louis Gonzaga, Duke (1566–1595)
- Charles III Gonzaga, Duke (1595–1637)

Low Countries

- United Provinces: Dutch Republic

For the preceding rulers, look under the List of state leaders in the 16th-century Holy Roman Empire

- Stadtholders (complete list) –

- Maurice, Stadtholder (1585–1625)

- Grand pensionaries (complete list) –

- Johan van Oldenbarnevelt, Grand Pensionary (1586–1619)

- County of Drenthe (complete list) –

For the preceding rulers, see the County of Drenthe under the List of state leaders in the 16th-century Holy Roman Empire

- Francisco Verdugo, Stadtholder (1581–1594)
- Frederik van den Bergh, in name only, Stadtholder (1595–1618)
- William Louis of Nassau-Dillenburg, Stadtholder (1595–1620)

- County of Flanders (complete list) –

- Philip IV the Handsome, Count (1482–1506)
- Charles III, Count (1506–1555)
- Philip V, Count (1555–1598)
- Isabella Clara Eugenia, Countess (1598–1621)

- Lordship of Frisia (complete list) –

For the preceding rulers, see the Lordship of Frisia under the List of state leaders in the 16th-century Holy Roman Empire

- Francisco Verdugo, Stadtholder (1581–1594)
- William I, Stadtholder (1580–1884)
- William Louis, Stadtholder (1584–1620)

- Lordship of Groningen (complete list) –

For the preceding rulers, see the Lordship of Groningen under the List of state leaders in the 16th-century Holy Roman Empire

- Francisco Verdugo, Stadtholder (1581–1594)
- William Louis, Stadtholder (1584–1620)

- Duchy of Guelders (complete list) –

For the preceding rulers, see the Duchy of Guelders under the List of state leaders in the 16th-century Holy Roman Empire

- William IV of Bergh, Stadtholder (1581–1585)
- Claude de Berlaymont, Stadtholder (1585–1587)
- Florent de Berlaymont, Stadtholder (1587–1626)
- Adolf van Nieuwenaar, Stadtholder (1584–1589)
- Maurice, Stadtholder (1590–1625)

- County of Holland, Lordship of Utrecht, County of Zeeland (complete list) –

For the preceding rulers, look under the List of state leaders in the 16th-century Holy Roman Empire

- William I, Stadtholder (1572–1584)
- Adolf van Nieuwenaar, Stadtholder (1584–1589)
- Maurice, Stadtholder (1585–1625)

- Lordship of Overijssel (complete list) –

For the preceding rulers, see the Lordship of Overijssel under the List of state leaders in the 16th-century Holy Roman Empire

- Francisco Verdugo, Stadtholder (1581–1594)
- Adolf van Nieuwenaar, Stadtholder (1584–1589)
- Frederik van den Bergh, Stadtholder (1594–1618)

=== Eurasia: Caucasus ===
Azerbaijan

- Quba Khanate (complete list) –

- Huseyn Ali, Khan (1680–1721)

Georgia

- Kingdom of Imereti (complete list) –

- Alexander II, King (1478–1510)
- Bagrat III, King (1510–1565)
- George II, King (1565–1585)
- Levan, King (1585–1590)
- Rostom, King (1590–1605)

- Kingdom of Kakheti (complete list) –

- Alexander I, King (1476–1511)
- George II, King (1511–1513)

rule by the Kingdom of Kartli (1513–1518)

- Levan, King (1518–1574)
- Alexander II, King (1574–1602, 1602–1605)

- Kingdom of Kartli (complete list) –

- Constantine II, King (1478–1505)
- David X, King (1505–1525)
- George IX, King (1525–1527)
- Luarsab I, King (1527–1556)
- Simon I, King (1556–1569, 1578–1600)
- David XI, King (1569–1578)
- George X, King (1600–1606)

Russia: Dagestan

- Gazikumukh Khanate (complete list) –

- Surkhay II ibn Chopan, Shamkhal (1605–1614)
- Andia ibn Chopan, Shamkhal (1614–1623)
- Eldar ibn Surkhay, Shamkhal (1623–1635)
- Aidemir ibn Sultan Mahmud, Shamkhal (1635–1640)
- Alibek II ibn Tuchilav, Khan (1642–1700)
- Surkhay ibn Garai-Bek, Khan (1700–1741)

== Oceania ==
Chile: Easter Island

- Easter Island (complete list) –

- Mahaki Tapu Vae Iti (Mahiki Tapuakiti), King (?)
- Ngau-ka Te Mahaki or Tuu Koiho (Ko-Tuu-ihu?), King (?)
- Anakena, King (?)
- Hanga Rau, King (?)
- Marama Ariki, King (c.1600)

Tonga

- Tuʻi Tonga Empire (complete list) –

- Kau Vaka'uta, King (?)
- Siulangapō, King (?)
- Vakalahi-Moheʻuli, King (c.1550)
- Moʻunga ʻo Tonga, King (?)

United States: Hawaii

- Island of Hawaiʻi (complete list) –

- Hākau, supreme high chief (1495–1510)
- 'Umi-a-Līloa, supreme high chief (1510–1525)
- Kealiʻiokaloa, supreme high chief (1525–1545)
- Keawenuiaʻumi, supreme high chief (1545–1575)
- Kaikilani, supreme high chief (female) (1575–1605)

== See also ==
- List of governors of dependent territories in the 16th century
- List of state leaders in the 16th-century Holy Roman Empire
- List of state leaders in 16th-century south Asia
