= List of captains regent of San Marino, 1701–1900 =

This is a list of captains regent (Capitani Reggenti) of San Marino from 1701 to 1900.

Year	Semester	Captain Regent	Captain Regent
1701	April	Alfonso Tosini	Francesco Moracci
1701	October	Giuliano Belluzzi	Lorenzo Giangi
1702	April	Giuseppe Loli	Melchiorre Martelli
1702	October	Giovanni Antonio Belluzzi	Gaspare Calbini
1703	April	Bernardino Leonardelli	Giovanni Antonio Fattori
1703	October	Onofrio Onofri	Baldassarre Tini
1704	April	Ottavio Leonardelli	Pietro Francini
1704	October	Giambattista Tosini	Tommaso Ceccoli
1705	April	Gian Giacomo Angeli	Lorenzo Giangi
1705	October	Giuseppe Loli	Melchiorre Martelli
1706	April	Giovanni Cionini	Gaspare Calbini
1706	October	Francesco Maccioni	Giambattista Ceccoli
1707	April	Onofrio Onofri	Giuseppe Zampini
1707	October	Federico Gozi	Francesco Moracci
1708	April	Giuliano Belluzzi	Tommaso Ceccoli
1708	October	Marino Enea Bonelli	Baldassarre Tini
1709	April	Gian Giacomo Angeli	Francesco Giangi
1709	October	Giovanni Antonio Belluzzi	Giovanni Antonio Fattori
1710	April	Giovanni Cionini	Melchiorre Martelli
1710	October	Francesco Maccioni	Pietro Francini
1711	April	Giuseppe Loli	Girolamo Martelli
1711	October	Federico Gozi	Giuseppe Zampini
1712	April	Onofrio Onofri	Giovanni Martelli
1712	October	Gian Giacomo Angeli	Bartolomeo Bedetti
1713	April	Giovanni Antonio Belluzzi	Giovanni Antonio Fattori
1713	October	Giuliano Belluzzi	Tommaso Ceccoli
1714	April	Giuseppe Onofri	Lorenzo Giangi
1714	October	Giuseppe Loli	Pietro Francini
1715	April	Giovanni Paolo Valloni	Giuseppe Zampini
1715	October	Bernardino Leonardelli	Marino Enea Bonelli
1716	April	Gian Giacomo Angeli	Giovanni Martelli
1716	October	Francesco Maria Belluzzi	Bartolomeo Bedetti
1717	April	Federico Gozi	Girolamo Martelli
1717	October	Ottavio Leonardelli	Francesco Giangi
1718	April	Giuliano Belluzzi	Marino Beni
1718	October	Tranquillo Manenti Belluzzi	Tommaso Ceccoli
1719	April	Giovanni Paolo Valloni	Baldassarre Tini (died in office); Francesco Moracci (replacement)
1719	October	Gian Giacomo Angeli	Lorenzo Giangi
1720	April	Benedetto Belluzzi	Giovanni Martelli
1720	October	Marino Enea Bonelli	Bartolomeo Bedetti
1721	April	Federico Gozi	Girolamo Martelli
1721	October	Bernardino Leonardelli	Francesco Giangi
1722	April	Francesco Maria Belluzzi	Marino Beni
1722	October	Valerio Maccioni	Pier Antonio Ugolini
1723	April	Giuseppe Onofri	Tommaso Ceccoli
1723	October	Pietro Loli	Giovanni Martelli
1724	April	Giovanni Paolo Valloni	Biagio Antonio Martelli
1724	October	Marino Enea Bonelli	Bartolomeo Bedetti
1725	April	Gian Giacomo Angeli	Lorenzo Giangi
1725	October	Federico Gozi	Marino Beni
1726	April	Tranquillo Manenti Belluzzi	Girolamo Martelli
1726	October	Valerio Maccioni	Pier Antonio Ugolini
1727	April	Giuseppe Onofri	Tommaso Ceccoli
1727	October	Gentile Maria Maggio	Giovanni Martelli
1728	April	Francesco Maria Belluzzi	Biagio Antonio Martelli
1728	October	Marino Enea Bonelli	Bernardino Capicchioni
1729	April	Giovanni Paolo Valloni	Francesco Giangi
1729	October	Gian Giacomo Angeli	Giovanni Andrea Beni
1730	April	Valerio Maccioni	Pier Antonio Ugolini
1730	October	Tranquillo Manenti Belluzzi	Girolamo Martelli
1731	April	Giuseppe Onofri	Lodovico Anatucci
1731	October	Giovanni Antonio Leonardelli	Bartolomeo Bedetti
1732	April	Giovanni Benedetto Belluzzi	Giovanni Martelli
1732	October	Valerio Maccioni	Vincenzo Moracci
1733	April	Francesco Maria Belluzzi	Giovanni Maria Giangi
1733	October	Giovanni Paolo Valloni	Giovanni Maria Beni
1734	April	Marino Enea Bonelli	Tommaso Capicchioni
1734	October	Giuseppe Onofri	Lodovico Anatucci
1735	April	Tranquillo Manenti Belluzzi	Biagio Antonio Martelli
1735	October	Federico Tosini	Pier Antonio Ugolini
1736	April	Gian Giacomo Angeli	Girolamo Martelli
1736	October	Francesco Maria Belluzzi	Giovanni Maria Giangi
1737	April	Valerio Maccioni	Vincenzo Moracci
1737	October	Filippo Manenti Belluzzi	Giuliano Malpeli
1738	April	Giuseppe Onofri	Giovanni Maria Beni
1738	October	Giovanni Antonio Leonardelli	Giovanni Martelli
1739	April	Giovanni Benedetto Belluzzi	Biagio Antonio Martelli
1739	October	Gian Giacomo Angeli	Alfonso Giangi
1739	end Oct.	Gaspare Fogli, gonfalonier (during Cardinal Giulio Alberoni's invasion)	
1740	5 February	Marino Enea Bonelli	Alfonso Giangi
1740	October	Giuseppe Onofri	Vincenzo Moracci
1741	April	Giovanni Maria Giangi	Marino Tini
1741	October	Lodovico Belluzzi	Pier Antonio Ugolini
1742	April	Girolamo Gozi	Giovanni Martelli
1742	October	Biagio Antonio Martelli	Domenico Bertoni
1743	April	Filippo Manenti Belluzzi	Filippo Fabbrini
1743	October	Giacomo Begni	Francesco Antonio Righi
1744	April	Giuseppe Onofri	Alfonso Giangi
1744	October	Giovanni Maria Giangi	Vincenzo Moracci
1745	April	Giambattista Zampini	Pompeo Zoli
1745	October	Girolamo Gozi	Tommaso Capicchioni
1746	April	Lodovico Belluzzi	Marc' Antonio Tassini
1746	October	Filippo Manenti Belluzzi	Domenico Bertoni
1747	April	Giacomo Begni	Ottavio Fazzini
1747	October	Biagio Antonio Martelli	Giovanni Martelli
1748	April	Giovanni Marino Giangi	Francesco Antonio Righi
1748	October	Costantino Bonelli	Pompeo Zoli
1749	April	Giuseppe Onofri	Vincenzo Moracci
1749	October	Lodovico Belluzzi	Marc' Antonio Tassini
1750	April	Filippo Manenti Belluzzi	Pier Antonio Ugolini
1750	October	Giovanni Antonio Leonardelli	Alfonso Giangi
1751	April	Aurelio Valloni	Filippo Fabbrini
1751	October	Giovanni Maria Giangi	Marino Tini
1752	April	Giacomo Begni	Pompeo Zoli
1752	October	Costantino Bonelli	Giovanni Martelli
1753	April	Giuseppe Onofri	Giuseppe Franzoni
1753	October	Filippo Manenti Belluzzi	Marc' Antonio Tassini
1754	April	Girolamo Gozi	Vincenzo Moracci
1754	October	Francesco Maccioni	Ottavio Fazzini
1755	April	Biagio Antonio Martelli	Giuseppe Bertoni
1755	October	Giacomo Begni	Paolo Tini
1756	April	Marino Belluzzi	Francesco Casali
1756	October	Giovanni Beni	Francesco Antonio Righi
1757	April	Giambattista Angeli	Marc' Antonio Tassini
1757	October	Filippo Manenti Belluzzi	Antonio Capicchioni
1758	April	Lodovico Belluzzi	Marino Tini
1758	October	Giovanni Maria Giangi	Giuseppe Franzoni
1759	April	Giacomo Begni	Pompeo Zoli
1759	October	Giovanni Antonio Leonardelli	Filippo Fazzini
1760	April	Aurelio Valloni	Francesco Antonio Righi
1760	October	Giambattista Angeli	Giovanni Pietro Martelli
1761	April	Francesco Maccioni	Marino Martelli
1761	October	Filippo Manenti	Marc' Antonio Tassini
1762	April	Giovanni Maria Giangi	Giuseppe Bertoni
1762	October	Giambattista Zampini	Pompeo Zoli
1763	April	Giambattista Bonelli	Filippo Fazzini
1763	October	Girolamo Gozi	Paolo Tini
1764	April	Giambattista Angeli	Antonio Capicchioni
1764	October	Giovanni Antonio Leonardelli	Marino Martelli
1765	April	Filippo Manenti	Marc' Antonio Tassini
1765	October	Francesco Begni	Francesco Benedetti
1766	April	Filippo Belluzzi	Pompeo Zoli
1766	October	Giuseppe Giannini	Giuseppe Franzoni
1767	April	Francesco Maccioni	Filippo Fazzini
1767	October	Giambattista Angeli	Giuseppe Bertoni
1768	April	Giuliano Gozi	Francesco Casali
1768	October	Costantino Bonelli	Giovanni Antonio Malpeli
1769	April	Baldassarre Giangi	Marc' Antonio Tassini
1769	October	Filippo Manenti	Francesco Antonio Casali
1770	April	Gaetano Belluzzi	Pompeo Zoli
1770	October	Giuseppe Giannini	Antonio Capicchioni
1771	April	Giambattista Angeli	Filippo Fazzini
1771	October	Giuliano Gozi	Angelo Ortolani
1772	April	Sebastiano Onofri	Giuseppe Bertoni
1772	October	Baldassarre Giangi	Francesco di Livio Casali
1773	April	Costantino Bonelli	Giovanni Antonio Malpeli
1773	October	Francesco Manenti	Pompeo Zoli
1774	April	Gaetano Belluzzi	Antonio Capicchioni
1774	October	Giuliano Belluzzi	Francesco Antonio Casali
1775	April	Giuliano Gozi	Angelo Ortolani
1775	October	Giambattista Angeli	Girolamo Paoloni
1776	April	Giuseppe Giannini	Antimo Meloni
1776	October	Francesco Onofri	Francesco di Livio Casali
1777	April	Costantino Bonelli	Francesco Moracci
1777	October	Pier Antonio Leonardelli	Giovanni Antonio Malpeli
1778	April	Baldassarre Giangi	Francesco Antonio Casali (died in office); Alessandro Martelli (replacement)
1778	October	Giambattista Bonelli	Pier Francesco Meloni
1779	April	Giuliano Gozi	Angelo Ortolani
1779	October	Filippo Belluzzi	Pompeo Zoli
1780	April	Francesco Manenti	Antonio Capicchioni
1780	October	Costantino Bonelli	Francesco di Livio Casali
1781	April	Pier Antonio Leonardelli	Girolamo Paoloni
1781	October	Baldassarre Giangi	Giovanni Antonio Malpeli
1782	April	Giambattista Bonelli	Antimo Meloni
1782	October	Giuseppe Giannini	Francesco Malpeli
1783	April	Francesco Begni	Pompeo Zoli
1783	October	Giuliano Gozi	Pier Francesco Vita
1784	April	Giambattista Zampini	Angelo Ortolani
1784	October	Francesco Manenti	Marino Francesconi
1785	April	Marino Giangi	Giovanni Antonio Malpeli
1785	October	Pier Antonio Leonardelli	Girolamo Paoloni
1786	April	Giambattista Bonelli	Matteo Martelli
1786	October	Giuliano Gozi	Francesco Faetani
1787	April	Giuliano Gozi	Francesco Faetani
1787	October	Francesco Onofri	Francesco Tini
1788	April	Giambattista Bonelli	Giovanni Filippi
1788	October	Francesco Begni	Filippo Fazzini
1789	April	Giuliano Belluzzi	Silvestro Masi
1789	October	Marino Giangi	Francesco Belzoppi
1790	April	Mariano Begni	Matteo Martelli
1790	October	Filippo Belluzzi	Antonio Capicchioni
1791	April	Francesco Giannini	Antimo Meloni
1791	October	Antonio Onofri	Girolamo Paoloni
1792	April	Giuliano Gozi	Giovanni Filippi
1792	October	Giambattista Bonelli	Marino Francesconi
1793	April	Giuliano Belluzzi	Marino Tassini
1793	October	Marino Giangi	Felice Caroti
1794	April	Marino Begni	Antonio Capicchioni
1794	October	Filippo Belluzzi	Pier Vincenzo Giannini
1795	April	Giuseppe Mercuri	Angelo Ortolani
1795	October	Francesco Giannini	Livio Casali
1796	April	Giuliano Gozi	Matteo Martelli
1796	October	Antonio Onofri	Marino Francesconi
1797	April	Giuliano Belluzzi	Girolamo Paoloni
1797	October	Annibale Gozi	Antonio Capicchioni
1798	April	Marino Begni	Alessandro Righi
1798	October	Marino Giangi	Vincenzo Belzoppi
1799	April	Francesco Giannini	Pietro Zoli
1799	October	Camillo Bonelli	Livio Casali
1800	April	Francesco Faetani	Matteo Martelli
1800	October	Giuseppe Mercuri	Pier Vincenzo Giannini
1801	April	Giuliano Belluzzi	Marino Bertoni
1801	October	Mariano Begni	Antonio Capicchioni
1802	April	Filippo Belluzzi	Marino Tassini
1802	October	Annibale Gozi	Giovanni Filippi
1803	April	Camillo Bonelli	Livio Casali
1803	October	Antonio Onofri	Marino Francesconi
1804	April	Marino Belluzzi	Matteo Martelli
1804	October	Francesco Giannini	Giuseppe Righi
1805	April	Francesco Maria Belluzzi	Antonio Capicchioni
1805	October	Mariano Begni	Giovanni Malpeli
1806	April	Giuseppe Mercuri	Marino Tassini
1806	October	Alessandro Righi	Pietro Berti
1807	April	Antonio Onofri	Marino Francesconi
1807	October	Camillo Bonelli	Livio Casali
1808	April	Marino Giangi	Matteo Martelli
1808	October	Federico Gozi	Pier Antonio Damiani
1809	April	Francesco Giannini	Vincenzo Belzoppi
1809	October	Mariano Begni	Giovanni Malpeli
1810	April	Lodovico Belluzzi	Maria Giuseppe Malpeli
1810	October	Antonio Onofri	Marino Francesconi
1811	April	Francesco Maria Belluzzi	Marino Bertoni
1811	October	Giuseppe Mercuri	Pier Vincenzo Giannini
1812	April	Camillo Bonelli	Livio Casali
1812	October	Francesco Giannini	Pietro Zoli
1813	April	Marino Belluzzi	Pier Antonio Damiani
1813	October	Mariano Begni	Giovanni Malpeli
1814	April	Federico Gozi	Andrea Albertini
1814	October	Lodovico Belluzzi	Maria Giuseppe Malpeli
1815	April	Giuseppe Mercuri	Pier Vincenzo Giannini
1815	October	Francesco Maria Belluzzi	Filippo Filippi
1816	April	Camillo Bonelli	Pietro Berti
1816	October	Luigi Giannini	Matteo Martelli
1817	April	Antonio Onofri	Pietro Zoli
1817	October	Federico Gozi	Vincenzo Belzoppi
1818	April	Giuliano Malpeli	Livio Casali
1818	October	Mariano Begni	Giovanni Malpeli
1819	April	Giuseppe Mercuri	Andrea Albertini
1819	October	Francesco Maria Belluzzi	Filippo Filippi
1820	April	Luigi Giannini	Matteo Martelli
1820	October	Camillo Bonelli	Marino Berti
1821	April	Antonio Onofri	Pier Vincenzo Giannini
1821	October	Giuliano Malpeli	Pietro Berti
1822	April	Federico Gozi	Francesco Guidi Giangi
1822	October	Mariano Begni	Giovanni Malpeli
1823	April	Giuseppe Mercuri	Marino Lonfernini
1823	October	Francesco Maria Belluzzi	Filippo Filippi
1824	April	Lodovico Belluzzi	Vincenzo Braschi
1824	October	Luigi Giannini	Bartolomeo Bartolotti
1825	April	Raffaele Gozi	Pietro Berti
1825	October	Camillo Bonelli	Pier Antonio Damiani
1826	April	Giambattista Onofri	Marino Berti
1826	October	Giuliano Malpeli	Marino Lonfernini
1827	April	Mariano Begni	Giovanni Malpeli
1827	October	Lodovico Belluzzi	Vincenzo Braschi
1828	April	Francesco Maria Belluzzi	Francesco Guidi Giangi
1828	October	Luigi Giannini	Giacomo Antonio Tini
1829	April	Camillo Bonelli	Pietro Zoli
1829	October	Giuseppe Mercuri	Filippo Filippi
1830	April	Giuliano Malpeli	Marino Lonfernini
1830	October	Giambattista Onofri	Pier Antonio Damiani
1831	April	Lodovico Belluzzi	Biagio Martelli
1831	October	Francesco Maria Belluzzi	Pier Matteo Berti
1832	April	Giovanni Benedetto Belluzzi	Bartolomeo Bartolotti
1832	October	Mariano Begni	Giovanni Malpeli
1833	April	Giuseppe Mercuri	Filippo Filippi
1833	October	Luigi Giannini	Vincenzo Braschi
1834	April	Lodovico Belluzzi	Francesco Guidi Giangi
1834	October	Giuliano Malpeli	Pietro Tassini
1835	April	Francesco Maria Belluzzi (died in office); Raffaele Gozi (replacement)	Pietro Zoli
1835	October	Giambattista Bonelli	Bartolomeo Bartolotti
1836	April	Giovanni Benedetto Belluzzi	Pier Antonio Damiani
1836	October	Giuseppe Gozi	Pier Matteo Berti
1837	April	Filippo Belluzzi	Filippo Filippi
1837	October	Giuseppe Mercuri	Marc' Antonio Tassini
1838	April	Girolamo Gozi	Francesco Guidi Giangi
1838	October	Mariano Begni	Domenico Maria Belzoppi
1839	April	Giambattista Bonelli	Bartolomeo Bartolotti
1839	October	Giuliano Malpeli	Biagio Martelli
1840	April	Giovanni Benedetto Belluzzi	Pietro Righi
1840	October	Raffaele Gozi	Pietro Zoli
1841	April	Filippo Belluzzi	Filippo Filippi
1841	October	Girolamo Gozi	Francesco Guidi Giangi
1842	April	Domenico Maria Belzoppi	Pier Matteo Berti
1842	October	Giuseppe Gozi	Domenic' Antonio Bartolotti
1843	April	Giuliano Malpeli	Marino Malpeli
1843	October	Lodovico Belluzzi	Biagio Martelli
1844	April	Giovanni Benedetto Belluzzi	Pietro Righi
1844	October	Pietro Zoli	Marino Berti
1845	April	Giambattista Bonelli	Francesco Valli
1845	October	Domenico Maria Belzoppi	Pier Matteo Berti
1846	April	Filippo Belluzzi	Filippo Filippi
1846	October	Francesco Guidi Giangi	Costanzo Damiani
1847	April	Girolamo Gozi	Domenic' Antonio Bartolotti
1847	October	Giuliano Malpeli	Biagio Martelli
1848	April	Giuseppe Gozi	Marino Malpeli
1848	October	Giovanni Benedetto Belluzzi	Pietro Righi
1849	April	Domenico Maria Belzoppi	Pier Matteo Berti
1849	October	Giambattista Braschi	Marino Lonfernini
1850	April	Vincenzo Angeli	Costanzo Damiani
1850	October	Giambattista Bonelli	Marino Berti
1851	April	Francesco Guidi Giangi	Marco Suzzi Valli
1851	October	Domenic' Antonio Bartolotti	Antonio Para
1852	April	Melchiorre Filippi	Pietro Righi
1852	October	Filippo Belluzzi	Gaetano Simoncini
1853	April	Domenico Maria Belzoppi	Pier Matteo Berti
1853	October	Giambattista Braschi	Francesco Valli
1854	April	Girolamo Gozi	Pietro Ugolini
1854	October	Francesco Guidi Giangi	Pietro Barbieri
1855	April	Gaetano Belluzzi (represented for most of his term by Filippo Belluzzi)	Francesco Rossini
1855	October	Giovanni Benedetto Belluzzi	Marino Masi
1856	April	Giuseppe Filippi	Pietro Righi
1856	October	Melchiorre Filippi	Gaetano Simoncini
1857	April	Innocenzo Bonelli	Domenico Fattori
1857	October	Settimio Belluzzi	Giacomo Berti
1858	April	Francesco Guidi Giangi	Marino Malpeli
1858	October	Filippo Belluzzi	Pasquale Marcucci
1859	April	Giuliano Belluzzi	Michele Ceccoli
1859	October	Palamede Malpeli	Pier Matteo Berti
1860	April	Giuseppe Filippi	Pietro Righi
1860	October	Gaetano Belluzzi	Costanzo Damiani
1861	April	Settimio Belluzzi	Giacomo Berti
1861	October	Melchiorre Filippi	Domenico Fattori
1862	April	Innocenzo Bonelli	Gaetano Simoncini
1862	October	Francesco Guidi Giangi	Pietro Tonnini
1863	April	Giuliano Belluzzi	Michele Ceccoli
1863	October	Giuseppe Filippi	Francesco Casali
1864	April	Gaetano Belluzzi	Pietro Righi
1864	October	Palamede Malpeli	Pasquale Marcucci
1865	April	Settimio Belluzzi	Giacomo Berti
1865	October	Filippo Belluzzi	Silvestro Masi
1866	April	Innocenzo Bonelli	Michele Vita
1866	October	Melchiorre Filippi	Domenico Fattori
1867	April	Giuliano Belluzzi	Michele Ceccoli
1867	October	Gaetano Simoncini	Pietro Righi
1868	April	Palamede Malpeli	Giuseppe Vagnini
1868	October	Pietro Tonnini	Sante Lonfernini
1869	April	Filippo Belluzzi	Francesco Malpeli
1869	October	Settimio Belluzzi	Giacomo Berti
1870	April	Innocenzo Bonelli	Ortollero Grazia
1870	October	Melchiorre Filippi	Domenico Fattori
1871	April	Gaetano Simoncini	Pietro Ugolini
1871	October	Palamede Malpeli	Luigi Pasquali
1872	April	Giuliano Belluzzi	Pietro Berti
1872	October	Federico Gozi	Francesco Malpeli
1873	April	Settimio Belluzzi	Francesco Marcucci
1873	October	Giuseppe Filippi	Marino Fattori
1874	April	Filippo Belluzzi	Marino Babboni
1874	October	Gaetano Simoncini	Domenico Fattori
1875	April	Palamede Malpeli	Luigi Pasquali
1875	October	Pietro Tonnini	Giuseppe Giacomini
1876	April	Gaetano Belluzzi	Sante Lonfernini
1876	October	Settimio Belluzzi	Michele Ceccoli
1877	April	Innocenzo Bonelli	Andrea Barbieri
1877	October	Giuliano Belluzzi	Pietro Ugolini
1878	April	Domenico Fattori	Marino Babboni
1878	October	Camillo Bonelli	Pietro Berti
1879	April	Gaetano Simoncini	Marino Nicolini
1879	October	Federico Gozi	Francesco Malpeli
1880	April	Luigi Pasquali	Giuseppe Giacomini
1880	October	Settimio Belluzzi	Pasquale Busignani
1881	April	Antonio Belluzzi	Marino Martelli
1881	October	Domenico Fattori	Teodoro Ceccoli
1882	April	Marino Fattori	Francesco Marcucci
1882	October	Giuliano Belluzzi	Michele Ceccoli
1883	April	Pietro Tonnini	Sante Lonfernini
1883	October	Pietro Filippi	Pietro Berti
1884	April	Settimio Belluzzi	Francesco Malpeli
1884	October	Federico Gozi	Antonio Righi
1885	April	Luigi Pasquali	Pasquale Busignani
1885	October	Antonio Michetti	Marino Nicolini
1886	April	Domenico Fattori	Teodoro Ceccoli
1886	October	Gaetano Simoncini	Pietro Ugolini
1887	April	Marino Fattori	Settimio Lonfernini
1887	October	Pietro Filippi	Federico Martelli
1888	April	Settimio Belluzzi	Marino Marcucci
1888	October	Federico Gozi	Antonio Righi
1889	April	Menetto Bonelli	Marino Babboni
1889	October	Domenico Fattori	Marino Nicolini
1890	April	Pietro Tonnini	Francesco Marcucci
1890	October	Giuliano Belluzzi	Pietro Ugolini
1891	April	Pietro Filippi	Federico Martelli
1891	October	Antonio Michetti	Pasquale Busignani
1892	April	Federico Gozi	Silvestro Vita
1892	October	Gemino Gozi	Giacomo Marcucci
1893	April	Menetto Bonelli	Marino Babboni
1893	October	Marino Fattori	Pietro Francini
1894	April	Pietro Tonnini (died 22 August); Giuliano Belluzzi (replacement)	Francesco Marcucci
1894	October	Settimio Belluzzi	Marino Borbiconi
1895	April	Domenico Fattori	Antonio Righi
1895	October	Federico Gozi	Vincenzo Mularoni
1896	April	Giovanni Bonelli	Settimio Lonfernini
1896	October	Menetto Bonelli	Marino Babboni
1897	April	Luigi Tonnini	Teodoro Ceccoli
1897	October	Antonio Belluzzi	Pasquale Busignani
1898	April	Pietro Filippi	Onofrio Fattori
1898	October	Marino Borbiconi	Francesco Marcucci
1899	April	Gemino Gozi	Giacomo Marcucci
1899	October	Federico Gozi	Silvestro Vita
1900	April	Domenico Fattori	Antonio Righi
1900	October	Giovanni Bonelli	Pietro Ugolini

== See also ==
- Diarchy
- List of Captains Regent of San Marino, 1243–1500
- List of Captains Regent of San Marino, 1500–1700
- List of Captains Regent of San Marino, 1900–present
- Politics of San Marino
