= Innocenzo Bonelli =

Captain Regent of San Marino

Innocenzo Bonelli was Captain Regent of San Marino in 1857 (with Domenico Fattori), 1862 (with Gaetano Simoncini), 1866 (with Michele Vita), 1870 (with Ortollero Grazia), and 1877 (with Andrea Barbieri).

== See also ==
- List of Captains Regent of San Marino, 1700–1900
