= Muzaffar Shah of Pahang =

Muzaffar Shah مظفر شاه
- Sultan of Pahang
- Reign: 1530–1540
- Predecessor: Mahmud Shah
- Successor: Zainal Abidin Shah
- Died: 1540
Regnal name
- Paduka Sri Sultan Muzaffar Shah ibni al-Marhum Sultan Mahmud Shah
Posthumous name
- Marhum di Tengah
- House: Malacca
- Father: Mahmud Shah
- Religion: Sunni Islam

Sultan Muzaffar Shah ibni Almarhum Sultan Mahmud Shah (died 1540) was the sixth Sultan of Pahang from 1530 to 1540. Known as Raja Muzaffar before his ascension, he was the eldest son of the fifth Sultan of Pahang, Mahmud Shah by his first wife, Raja Fatimah binti al-Marhum Sultan Alauddin Riayat Shah. He succeeded his father on his death in 1530.

== Reign ==
Sultan Muzaffar was enthroned at Sayong Pinang, by his first cousin, Alauddin Riayat Shah II of Johor. At the beginning of his reign, a leader of the Orang Laut named Patih Ludang from Singapore whom earlier had quarrelled with Sang Setia, a Hulubalang from Johor, sought protection in Pahang with his followers. Patih Ludang was killed by Sang Setia in the court of Johor while escorting Sultan Muzaffar in his enthronement ceremony. The incident was ultimately settled amicably without further bloodshed between both states.

Contrary to the reign of his father that saw numerous armed conflicts with the Portuguese Malacca, Sultan Muzaffar's reign was characterised by relative peace and stability. It was during his reign, that a Portuguese merchant who went by the name Tome Lobo, had a permanent establishment in the Pahang capital. This was based on the account of a Portuguese explorer Fernão Mendes Pinto who journeyed to Pahang with a merchant vessel in 1540.

Misfortune overtook the Portuguese merchants when they were caught in an uproar in the capital, following the murder of the Sultan. A mob attacked their residence and seized their goods which amounted fifty thousand ducats in gold and precious stone alone. The Portuguese managed to escape and proceeded to Pattani. They made representations to the King of Pattani, who gave them permission to take reprisals by attacking Pahang boats in the Kelantan River, then a province of Pattani, and to recover goods up to the value what had been lost. The Portuguese took the king by his word, fitted out an expedition, and proceeded to the Kelantan River where they attacked and captured three junks owned by Pahangese merchants, killing seventy four of them, whilst losing only three of their own men.

== Death ==
The sultan, who, according to Pinto, was killed in 1540 appears to have been Sultan Muzaffar. He was killed by Khoja Zainal, a wealthy merchant who was also a leader of the Bruneian envoy that resided in Pekan, for committing adultery with his wife. Sultan Muzaffar was posthumously styled Marhum di Tengah ('the late ruler who was buried in the centre') after his death and was succeeded by his younger brother, Raja Zainal.

== Bibliography ==
- Ahmad Sarji, Abdul Hamid (2011), The Encyclopedia of Malaysia, vol. 16 - The Rulers of Malaysia, Editions Didier Millet, ISBN 978-981-3018-54-9
- Buyong Adil (1972), Sejarah Pahang ('History of Pahang'), Dewan Bahasa dan Pustaka
- Khoo, Gilbert (1980), From Pre-Malaccan period to present day, New Straits Times
- Linehan, William (1973), History of Pahang, Malaysian Branch Of The Royal Asiatic Society, Kuala Lumpur, ISBN 978-0710-101-37-2
- Suria Fadhillah Md Fauzi; Zarith Sofiah Othman; Sharifah Shatrah Syed Hamid (2014), Undang-Undang Tubuh Kerajaan Pahang: Raja Pemerintah Sebagai Simbol Kuasa dan Kedaulatan Negeri, International Conference on Law, Policy and Social Justice, archived from the original on 2015-06-20
- Melayu Online, The Pahang Sultanate, archived from the original on 2014-11-09

Muzaffar Shah of Pahang House of Malacca Died: 1540
Regnal titles
Preceded by Mahmud Shah I	Sultan of Pahang; 1530–1540	Succeeded by Zainal Abidin Shah
