= Antonio Onofri =

Sammarinese politician and diplomat

Antonio Onofri (1759 – 26 February 1825) was a politician and diplomat of the Republic of San Marino, a key figure in the country's political scene in the late 18th century and early 19th century. His "prudence and patriotism" during this challenging period in the Republic's history earned him a statue in the Public Council Hall and recognition as "the Father of his country". He was also the first Secretary of Foreign and Political Affairs of the country.

== Early life ==
Onofri came from an old family that had a great influence on the fate of the Republic for centuries. He received a thorough education in philosophy and law. In 1787, he was appointed as secretary of state, and in 1789, he was elected a member of the Grand and General Council. During his long career, he also served as Captain Regent seven times.

== Career ==
Onofri's accomplishments are linked in particular to his foreign policy, which led to the recognition of San Marino by other European countries. In 1797, when Napoleon Bonaparte was camped at nearby Pesaro during the Italian campaign of the French Revolutionary Wars, a proposal to enlarge the territory of San Marino offered by the general's envoy Gaspard Monge was graciously rejected by Onofri as Captain Regent on behalf of the Republic. However, he accepted 15,000 quintals of wheat and the promise of four pieces of artillery, the latter of which seems never to have been delivered. Onofri insisted that it was San Marino's experience that their greatest safeguard was not coveting their neighbours' territory. This prudent decision (justified by Onofri thus: "wars end, but neighbours remain") is believed to have saved the Republic from reprisals upon the later defeat of Napoleon.

In 1798 he signed a treaty on trade and friendly relations with the Roman Republic, and several months later also with the Cisalpine Republic. A similar agreement was also reached with the Italian Republic, which took the place of the two previously mentioned, in June 1802. On May 26, 1805, again as Captain Regent, he attended the coronation of Napoleon Bonaparte as the King of Italy in Milan, where he received an "amiable audience" with the now-Emperor of France.

After the Congress of Vienna, Onofri helped establish good relations with Louis XVIII, Charles X and Louis Philippe, as well as negotiating the country's way into the favour of Pope Leo XII, who after an audience with Onofri wrote a letter to the Captains Regent, "assuring them of his friendship and renewing the ancient conventions with them".

== Legacy ==
In 2005, the 180th anniversary of Onofri's death was marked by a special commemorative silver €5 coin.
