= Lodovico di Marino Belluzzi =

Captain Regent of San Marino

Lodovico Belluzzi was Captain Regent of San Marino, from April 1834 to October 1834. He shared his term with Francesco Guidi Giangi.

== See also ==
- List of Captains Regent of San Marino, 1700–1900
