= Marino Fattori =

Sammarinese writer and politician

Marino Fattori (Cailungo, Borgo Maggiore, 25 March 1832 – San Marino, 27 April 1896) was a Sammarinese writer and politician. He was Captains Regent in 1873, 1882, 1887 and 1893.

He studied veterinary at the University of Bologna and also some courses in Latin and Greek. He worked as a teacher and published Ricordi storici della republica di S. Marino (1869).
