= Domenico Maria Belzoppi =

Captain Regent of San Marino

Domenico Maria Belzoppi (1796 - 1864 CE) was Captain Regent of San Marino in 1849 (April–October). He served with Pier Matteo Berti. During his term, Giuseppe Garibaldi came to San Marino after fleeing from Rome. He found safety here. Garibaldi actually met with Belzoppi. Because San Marino offered Garibaldi safety in 1849, it was able to remain independent during Italian unification.
