= Domenico Fattori =

Sammarinese politician

Domenico Fattori was a Sammarinese politician who was the Secretary for Foreign Affairs of San Marino from 1860 to 1908. Fattori also served as a captain regent of San Marino 12 times between 1857 and 1914, each for the usual six-month terms. He was the Captain Regent with the longest cumulative term (six years).
