= Ogada =

Ogada is an East African surname. Notable people with the surname include:

- Douglas Ogada (born 1948), Ugandan boxer
- Job Seda (1956–2019), better known as Ayub Ogada, Kenyan singer
- Jude Ogada (born 1989), Nigerian football defender
- Michael Olunga Ogada (born 1994), Kenyan professional footballer

== See also ==
- Krystalin (Ruth Ogada), a Marvel Comics character
- Ogata, Japanese surname
