= Ogata (disambiguation) =

Ogata is a Japanese surname.

Ogata or Ōgata may also refer to:

- Ogata, Ōita, a town in Ōita Prefecture, Japan
- Ōgata, Akita, a village in Akita Prefecture, Japan
- Ōgata, Kōchi, a former town in Kōchi Prefecture, Japan
- Ōgata, Niigata, a former town in Niigata Prefecture, Japan
