= Ogata =

Ogata (written: 尾形, 緒方, 緒形, 小形, 小県 or 尾方) is a Japanese surname. Notable people with the surname include:

- Akari Ogata (緒方 亜香里, born 1990), Japanese judoka
- Akinori Ogata (尾形 明紀, born 1973), Japanese stock car racing driver
- Akira Ogata (緒方 章, 1887–1978), Japanese chemist
- Atsunobu Ogata (緒方 厚信, born 1948), Japanese sprint canoeist
- Atsushi Ogata (緒方 篤, born 1962), Japanese film director and screenwriter
- Ogata Gekkō (尾形 月耕, 1859–1920), Japanese painter
- Hideo Ogata (尾形 英夫, 1934–2007), Japanese anime producer and planner
- Issey Ogata (イッセー 尾形, born 1952), Japanese actor and comedian
- Kanako Ogata (緒方 かな子, born 1973), Japanese singer and television personality
- Ken Ogata (緒形 拳, 1937–2008), Japanese actor
- Kenichi Ogata (shoot boxer) (緒形 健一, born 1975), Japanese kickboxer
- Kenichi Ogata (voice actor) (緒方 賢一, born 1942), Japanese actor and voice actor
- Kenje Ogata (緒方 健二, 1919–2012), American soldier
- Ogata Kenzan (尾形 乾山, 1663–1743), Japanese potter and painter
- Kiyochi Ogata (绪方 敬志, died 1944), Japanese colonel
- Koichi Ogata (緒方 孝市, born 1968), Japanese baseball player
- Koji Ogata (尾方 弘二, born 1968), Japanese instructor of Shotokan karate
- Ogata Kōan (緒方 洪庵, 1810–1863), Japanese physician
- Ogata Kōrin (尾形 光琳, 1658–1716), Japanese painter
- Masafumi Ogata (born 1968), Japanese video game composer
- Masaki Ogata (小県 真樹, born 1964), Japanese Go player
- Megumi Ogata (緒方 恵美, born 1965), Japanese voice actress and singer
- Mitsuru Ogata (小形 満, born 1961), Japanese voice actor
- Naoto Ogata (緒形 直人, born 1967), Japanese actor
- Paul Ogata (born 1968), American stand-up comedian and actor
- Ryuichi Ogata (緒方 龍一, born 1985), Japanese singer, rapper, guitarist
- Ogata no Saburo Koreyoshi (緒方 惟栄, ca. 1100–1200), Japanese nobleman
- Sadako Ogata (緒方 貞子, 1927–2019), Japanese diplomat and academic
- Shigeo Ogata (緒方 茂生, born 1968), Japanese freestyle swimmer
- Shigetake Ogata (緒方 重威, born 1934), Japanese former lawyer
- Shuto Ogata (尾形 崇斗, born 1999), Japanese baseball player
- Taketora Ogata (緒方 竹虎, 1888–1956), Japanese newspaper editor and politician
- Tsuyoshi Ogata (尾方 剛, born 1973), Japanese long-distance runner
- Yasuo Ogata (緒方 靖夫, born 1947), Japanese politician
- Denden (緒方 義博, born Yoshihiro Ogata, 1950), Japanese actor and comedian
- Yoshiko Ogata (緒方 芳子, born 1976), Japanese mathematical physicist
- Yoshiyuki Ogata (緒方 良行, born 1998), Japanese sport climber and boulderer
- Yuka Ogata (緒方 夕佳, born 1975), Japanese politician
- Yuna Ogata (緒方 佑奈, born 1997), Japanese voice actress and singer

== Fictional characters ==
- Chieri Ogata (緒方 智絵里), a character in the video game The Idolmaster Cinderella Girls
- Matake Ogata (緒方 真竹), a character in the light novel series Shakugan no Shana
- Rin Ogata (尾形 琳), protagonist of the manga series Rideback
- Hyakunosuke Ogata (尾形 百之助), a character in the manga series Golden Kamuy
- Baku Ogata, a character in the video game Shogo: Mobile Armor Division
