= Lindsay Seidel =

American voice actress

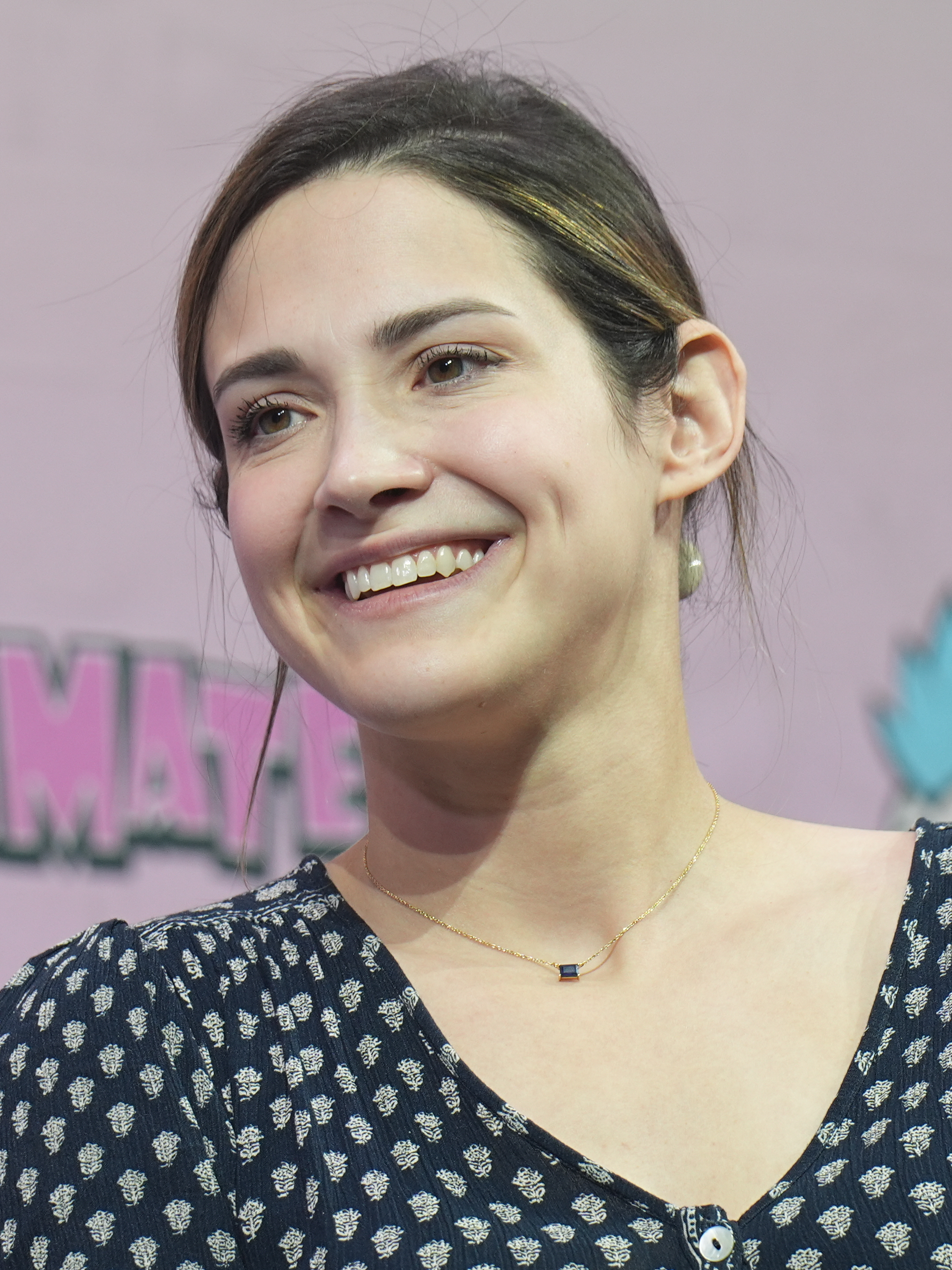
- Seidel at Animate! Columbus in 2024
- Occupation: Voice actress
- Years active: 2009–present

Lindsay Seidel is an American voice actress, mostly known for her work in the dubbing of various anime series in English. Some of her noteworthy roles include Nagisa Shiota in Assassination Classroom and Gabi Braun in the final season of Attack on Titan. Other major roles include: Yayoi Kunizuka in Psycho-Pass , Mira Konohata in Asteroid in Love, Nejire Hado in My Hero Academia, Meme Tatane in Soul Eater Not!, Kino in Kino's Journey, Raeliana McMillan in Why Raeliana Ended Up at the Duke's Mansion, Ruka Urushibara in Steins;Gate, Eto Yoshimura in Tokyo Ghoul, Romeo Conbolt and Sorano Agria in Fairy Tail, Belfast in Azur Lane, Vanica Zogratis in Black Clover, Maya Fey in the Ace Attorney TV series, as well as Pochita in Chainsaw Man. She was also one of the lead actresses in the cult classic horror torture film "The Final" directed by Joey Stewart.

== Biography ==
Seidel started voice acting professionally at the age of 10 years old, where she voiced lines for use in a Japanese to English textbook. In 2015, she was awarded voice actress of the year by the Behind the Voice Actors website. In 2020, Seidel attended both MCM London Comic Con and SacAnime as a guest of honor. As of January 2020, she is based in Dallas.

== Filmography ==
=== Anime ===
List of voice performances in anime
Year	Title	Role	Notes	Source
2010	Phantom: Requiem for the Phantom	Ein		
2010	Sekirei: Pure Engagement	Shijime, Yashima		
2011	Fairy Tail	Angel, Romeo Conbolt		
2011	Blood-C	Nene Motoe, Nono Motoe		
2011	Baka and Test	Hazuki Shimada		
2011	.hack//Quantum	Hermit		
2012	Okami-san and Her Seven Companions	Majolika le Fay		
2012	Black Butler	Luka Macken		
2012	Shangri-La	Kuniko Hojo		
2012	Fractale	Sanko		
2012	Deadman Wonderland	Mimi	Ep. 1	
2012	Is This a Zombie?	Kyoko		
2012	Steins;Gate	Ruka Urushibara		
2012	Shakugan no Shana	Konoe		
2012	A Certain Magical Index series	Aisa Himegami		
2012	Level E	Miho Edogawa		
2013	Tenchi Muyo! War on Geminar	Yeliss		
2013	Last Exile: Fam, the Silver Wing	Marilla	Eps. 15–17	
2013	Michiko & Hatchin	Vanessa Lee	Ep. 13	
2013	Eureka Seven: AO	Naru Arata		
2013	Future Diary	Reisuke Hojo (5th)		
2013	Good Luck Girl!	Mai Endo, Sorata Tsuwabuki		
2013	Robotics;Notes	Akiho Senomiya		
2014	Psycho-Pass	Yayoi Kunizuka		
2014	Ben-To	Asebi Inoue		
2014	Hetalia: The Beautiful World	Wy		
2015	Wanna Be the Strongest in the World	Sakura Hagiwara	Credited as Elizabeth Lewis	
2015	Ping Pong: The Animation	Yurie		
2015	D-Frag!	Tama Sakai		
2015	The Rolling Girls	Aki Uihara/Thunderoad	Eps. 3–4	
2015	Tokyo Ghoul	Eto Yoshimura		
2015	Unbreakable Machine-Doll	Frey		
2015	Yona of the Dawn	Min-su	Eps. 1–2	
2015	Danganronpa: The Animation	Celestia Ludenberg		
2015	Soul Eater Not!	Meme Tatane		
2015–16	Assassination Classroom	Nagisa Shiota		
2016	Barakamon	Yutaka		
2016	Brothers Conflict	Mahoko Imai		
2016	Divine Gate	Hikari		
2016	Garo: The Animation	Orletta	Ep. 20	
2016	No-Rin	Akina Nakazawa		
2016	Selector Infected WIXOSS	Ruko Kominato		
2016	Tokyo ESP	Kozuki Kuroi		
2017	Alice & Zoroku	Chika		
2017	KanColle: Kantai Collection	Airfield Princess		
2017	Konohana Kitan	Yuzu		
2017	King's Game: The Animation	Aimi		
2017	Myriad Colors Phantom World	Haruhiko's Mom		
2017	Star Blazers: Space Battleship Yamato 2199	Mirenel Linke		
2017	Kino's Journey	Kino		
2018	Ace Attorney	Maya Fey		
2018	Magical Girl Raising Project	Top Speed		
2018	SSSS.Gridman	Akane Shinjo		
2018	Harukana Receive	Akari Ōshiro		
2018–22	My Hero Academia	Nejire Hado		
2019	Azur Lane	Belfast		
2019	Boogiepop and Others	Akiko, Additional Voices	4 episodes	
2019	Wise Man's Grandchild	Sicily von Claude		
2019–21	The Quintessential Quintuplets	Ichika Nakano		
2020	Toilet-Bound Hanako-kun	Mokke		
2020	Bofuri	Frederica	2 seasons	
2020	Asteroid in Love	Mira		
2020	Kakushigoto	Ichiko		
2020	Assault Lily Bouquet	Yuyu Shirai		
2020–24	Our Last Crusade or the Rise of a New World	Mismis		
2021	Kuma Kuma Kuma Bear	Kumakyu, Kumayuru		
2021	Attack on Titan	Gabi Braun		
2021	Sakura Wars the Animation	Klara		
2021	Sorcerous Stabber Orphen	Azalie		
2021	Black Clover	Vanica Zogratis		
2021	Love Live! Nijigasaki High School Idol Club	Kanata Konoe	2 seasons	
2021	Rumble Garanndoll	Rin		
2021–present	Mushoku Tensei	Eris Boreas Greyrat		
2022	Heroines Run the Show	Naho		
2022	Love After World Domination	Desumi Magahara		
2022	Parallel World Pharmacy	Lotte		
2022	Remake Our Life!	Aki Shino		
2022	Chainsaw Man	Pochita		
2022	Spy × Family	Fiona Frost	Replaced with Bryn Apprill (only episode 21)	
2022–24	Date A Live	Artemisia Bell Ashcroft	Seasons 4–5	
2023	Why Raeliana Ended Up at the Duke's Mansion	Rinko/Raeliana		
2023	KamiKatsu	Siluril		
2023	Am I Actually the Strongest?	Irisphilia		
2023–24	Shangri-La Frontier	Bilac		
2024	Bucchigiri?!	Mahoro Jin		
2024	Frieren: Beyond Journey's End	Sense		
2024	Fairy Tail: 100 Years Quest	Romeo Conbolt		
2024	One Piece	Vegapunk Edison		
2025	Dr. Stone: Science Future	Kirisame		
2025	Failure Frame	Ikusaba		
2025	Dealing with Mikadono Sisters Is a Breeze	Miwa		
2025	Even Given the Worthless "Appraiser" Class, I'm Actually the Strongest	Claudia		
2025	The Water Magician	Lyn		
2025–present	I Left My A-Rank Party to Help My Former Students Reach the Dungeon Depths!	Marina		
2026	Kaiju Girl Caramelise	Jumbo King		
2026	The Daily Life of a Middle-Aged Online Shopper in Another World	Lilith		
2026	The World's Strongest Witch	Lorna Hermit		

=== Animation ===
List of voice performances in animation
Year	Title	Role	Notes	Source
2025	To Be Hero X	Big Johnny		

=== Films ===
List of voice performances in films
Year	Title	Role	Notes	Source
2012	Tales of Vesperia: The First Strike	Emma		
2012	Fafner Heaven and Earth	Jing-Jing		
2013	One Piece Film: Strong World	Xiao		
2016	Psycho-Pass: The Movie	Yayoi Kunizuka		
2022	The Quintessential Quintuplets Movie	Ichika Nakano		
2023	Psycho-Pass: Sinners of the System – Crime and Punishment	Yayoi Kunizuka		
2023	Psycho-Pass Providence	Yayoi Kunizuka		
2024	Spy × Family Code: White	Fiona Frost		

=== Video games ===
List of voice performances in video games
Year	Title	Role	Notes	Source
2014	Smite	Neith		
2018	Paladins: Champions of the Realm	Cassie		
2019	Borderlands 3	Reba		
2020	My Hero One's Justice 2	Nejire Chan/Nejire Hado	English dub	
2022	Tiny Tina's Wonderlands	Leiara		

=== Live-action ===
List of live-action performances
Year	Title	Role	Notes	Source
2010	The Final	Emily		
