= An Adventurer's Daily Grind at Age 29 =

Japanese manga series

- First tankōbon volume cover, featuring Rirui (left) and Hajime Shinonome (right)

29歳独身中堅冒険者の日常 (29-sai Dokushin Chūken Bōkensha no Nichijō)
- Genre: Fantasy
- Manga
- Written by: Ippei Nara
- Published by: Kodansha
- English publisher: Kodansha
- Imprint: Shōnen Magazine Comics
- Magazine: Bessatsu Shōnen Magazine
- Original run: January 9, 2016 – present
- Volumes: 22
- Anime television series
- Directed by: Riki Fukushima
- Written by: Riki Fukushima
- Music by: Akinari Suzuki; Johannes Nilsson; Manami Takamoto
- Studio: Hornets
- Licensed by: Crunchyroll
- Original network: AT-X, Tokyo MX, KBS Kyoto, SUN, BS11, Miyatele, Mētele
- Original run: January 7, 2026 – March 25, 2026
- Episodes: 12
- icon

An Adventurer's Daily Grind at Age 29 (Japanese: 29歳独身中堅冒険者の日常, Hepburn: 29-sai Dokushin Chūken Bōkensha no Nichijō) is a Japanese manga series written and illustrated by Ippei Nara. It began serialization in Kodansha's Bessatsu Shōnen Magazine in January 2016, and has been compiled into 22 tankōbon volumes as of July 2026. An anime television series adaptation produced by Hornets aired from January to March 2026.

== Plot ==
The series follows Hajime Shinonome, a skilled adventurer currently living in the village of Komai. Due to his past living in a slum and experiencing hunger, he appreciates his current life as an adventurer, fulfilling quests and hunting for food. One day, while exploring a dungeon, he encounters a slime monster trying to eat a girl. Rescuing the girl, she introduces herself as Rirui, an orphan who had been abandoned by her parents. Feeling sorry for her situation and remembering his own past, Hajime decides to take care of Rirui.

== Characters ==
Hajime Shinonome (シノノメ・ハジメ, Shinonome Hajime)
Voiced by: Makoto Furukawa (Japanese); Sean Letourneau (English)
A silver-ranked adventurer. He is friendly with the local villagers, who see him as their protector. However, due to past trauma from seeing other adventurers getting killed, he tries to avoid getting too attached to others. He previously lived a difficult life, barely getting any food. He takes quests to protect the villagers and get food.
Rirui (リルイ)
Voiced by: Sayumi Suzushiro (Japanese); Nia Celeste (English)
A young girl whom Hajime rescued while she was being eaten by a slime monster. She was abandoned by her parents and had accidentally arrived in the village. With nowhere to go and with her unlikely to be taken by the local orphanage, Hajime decides to adopt her.
Veronica (ヴェロニカ, Veronika)
Voiced by: Shizuka Itō
A succubus who runs a shop. She has known Hajime for a long time.
Anyango (アニャンゴ)
Voiced by: Yūki Kuwahara
A young dwarf girl who joins Rirui as an adventurer.
Richat (リシャット, Rishatto)
Voiced by: Tomohiro Ōno
Olive Carmen (オリーヴ・カルメン, Orīvu Karumen)
Voiced by: Yuna Ogata (Japanese); Abigail Blythe (English)
An elf and head of the local village branch of the guild who works with Hajime.
Natalie (ナタリー, Natarī)
Voiced by: Kaori Maeda
Cocko (コッコ, Kokko)
Voiced by: Haruka Shiraishi
Young daughter of Cockdole who appears to be half beastkin, she joins Rirui and Anyango for adventures. They initially didn't care for her, but she soon became part of the group.
Cockdole (クックドル, Kukkudoru)
Voiced by: Yasunori Matsumoto
The father of Cocko, he is a chicken beastkin, and a researcher. However, people think he is a 'bird brain' and does not respect him, which upsets his daughter.
Sekihime (セキヒメ)
Voiced by: Saori Hayami
The Dungeon Destroyer for the guild, Sekihime is a medusa and can't open her eyes otherwise she will destroy anything she sees. Because Hajime treats her well, she develops a crush on him.
Jessica (ジェシカ, Jeshika)
Voiced by: Saori Ōnishi
Tanya (ターニャ, Tānya)
Voiced by: Maki Kawase
Dragon (ドラゴン, Doragon)
Voiced by: Akira Sekine

== Media ==
=== Manga ===
The series is written and illustrated by Ippei Nara. It began serialization in Kodansha's Bessatsu Shōnen Magazine on January 9, 2016. The series has been compiled into twenty-two tankōbon volumes as of July 2026.

The manga's chapters are published in English on Kodansha's K Manga app.

No.	Release date	ISBN
1	June 9, 2016	978-4-06-395679-5
2	November 9, 2016	978-4-06-395772-3
3	May 9, 2017	978-4-06-395935-2
4	November 9, 2017	978-4-06-510237-4
5	May 9, 2018	978-4-06-511405-6
6	November 9, 2018	978-4-06-513244-9
7	May 9, 2019	978-4-06-515075-7
8	November 9, 2019	978-4-06-517301-5
9	May 8, 2020	978-4-06-518845-3
10	December 9, 2020	978-4-06-521248-6
11	June 9, 2021	978-4-06-523414-3
12	December 9, 2021	978-4-06-526267-2
13	June 9, 2022	978-4-06-528175-8
14	December 9, 2022	978-4-06-529942-5
15	June 8, 2023	978-4-06-531882-9
16	December 7, 2023	978-4-06-533896-4
17	June 7, 2024	978-4-06-535794-1
18	December 9, 2024	978-4-06-537760-4
19	May 9, 2025	978-4-06-539057-3
20	September 9, 2025	978-4-06-540700-4
21	February 9, 2026	978-4-06-542623-4
22	July 9, 2026	978-4-06-544338-5

=== Anime ===
An anime television series adaptation was announced on May 5, 2025. It is produced by Hornets and directed and written by Riki Fukushima, with Yoshihiro Nagamori designing the characters, and Akinari Suzuki, Johannes Nilsson, and Manami Takamoto composing the music. The series aired from January 7 to March 25, 2026, on AT-X and other networks. HoneyWorks will perform the opening theme song "Kimi ga Tomoshite Kureta Hikari o Ima" (君が灯してくれた光を今) featuring Hanon, as well as the ending theme song "Kimi no Tonari wa Kūki ga Oishii" (君の隣は空気が美味しい) featuring Kotoha. Crunchyroll will stream the series.

==== Episodes ====
No.	Title	Directed by	Written by	Storyboarded by	Original release date
1	"A Single Man and a Little Girl Meet"; Transliteration: "Deatta, Dokushin to Yōjo" (Japanese: 出会った、独身と幼女)	Rei Kurosawa	Riki Fukushima	Riki Fukushima	January 7, 2026
Having grown up in the slums Hajime works hard to avoid starvation and before he knows it he is 29 years old, a Silver rank adventurer and living in Komai village. The villagers all respect him as he enters the local dungeon daily for meat to support them. One day he finds a little girl named Rirui in the dungeon about to be eaten by a slime. Rirui explains her parents abandoned her so she wants to support herself. Olive from the guild explains as Rirui is not local the orphanage can't take her in. Rirui tries to hunt a wolf to prove herself. After rescuing her again Hajime decides to take her in. Overnight Rirui grows into a buxom young woman, but returns to being a child upon waking. Hajime realises she must be from an ancient species and Olive agrees to do some research. Feeling useless, Rirui refuses to eat until she has become useful, so Hajime shows her the trick to killing slimes. Hajime is surprised Rirui holds his hand on the walk home. Olive becomes worried about Hajime's safety as her research reveals the only ancient species that become adults at night are the Succubus.
2	"Rirui's Talent"; Transliteration: "Rirui no Sainō" (Japanese: リルイの才能)	Takahide Ogata	Takayuki Yamazaki	Katsumi Ono	January 14, 2026
Olive informs Hajime Rirui might be a succubus. To confirm this Hajime is forced to visit the only other succubus he knows; Veronica, a sexual sadist. Veronica confirms Rirui is a succubus and Hajime insists on paying cash for her consultation, as he is terrified of owing her a favour. The next morning Veronica offers to take Rirui herself, deciding she has enough potential to work for her, and manipulates Hajime into admitting life would be easier without Rirui. As a group they go dungeon raiding but Hajime is distracted and Veronica and Rirui set off a teleport trap, ending up in a different part of the dungeon while Hajime is left with Veronica's masochist elf servant. Veronica can't help teasing Rirui, undermining her confidence as an adventurer and causing an infant cyclops to chase them. They hide but Rirui becomes even more upset after dropping her sword. Veronica asks why she wants to be an adventurer when working for her would be safer. Rirui is uncertain, except that she wants to be useful to Hajime. Hajime kills the cyclops and, finding Rirui's sword, assumes she and Veronica were killed. He quickly realises where they are hiding and that Rirui gained some confidence. They decide to continue adventuring and Veronica admits defeat. She also promises Hajime if he does anything inappropriate with the adult Rirui he will be punished.
3	"Rirui and Anyango"; Transliteration: "Rirui to Ayango" (Japanese: リルイとアニャンゴ)	Rei Kurosawa	Ikumi Nomura	Hatsuki Tsuji	January 21, 2026
Rirui insists on buying a Good Luck egg from a shady merchant and trying to hatch it. Hajime encounters another little girl being eaten by a slime, the dwarf Anyango. Luckily, he is able to return her to her grandmother, but she is too elderly to stop Anyango running off to the dungeon anymore. Hajime is eventually convinced to escort Anyango into the dungeon safely. Anyango reveals she wants to master fire spirit magic and become a blacksmith. In the dungeon Hajime rescues Anyango from boar monsters. Rirui becomes inexplicably jealous, releasing a wave of succubus energy that convinces Hajime Veronica is targeting him. Rirui dreams of using magic, so Hajime takes her to the Sun Church where Rirui is teleported alone to the Selection Forest. Without Hajime, Rirui panics at every passing spirit but keeps going until she encounters an immense sea turtle. At first she is terrified, until it drips water on her then completely vanishes, leaving a marking on her hand. Upset, Rirui returns to Hajime but learns the turtle was the rarely encountered Millenian, and if he gave Rirui a mark it means she can use powerful water spirit magic. Rirui tries to use magic, but the result is a water stream so weak it doesn't even deter slimes from trying to eat her again.
4	"First Love's Outcome"; Transliteration: "Hatsukoi no Yukue" (Japanese: 初恋の行方)	Shunpei Umemoto	Takayuki Yamazaki	Shunpei Umemoto	January 28, 2026
Hajime is offered a promotion quest to explore an old dungeon before it is closed by the Dungeon Destroyer, another ancient species. After clearing the dungeon Anyango and Rirui become Bronze rank adventurers. Dungeon Destroyer Sekihime the Medusa arrives. As her gaze turns everything into stone, she must keep her eyes permanently closed. By opening her eyes inside the dungeon everything is petrified and the dungeon collapses. Rirui feels sorry for Sekihime. The next morning they are somehow back in the dungeon and Sekihime has lost her medusa power and is finally able to open her eyes. Hajime theorises they are not in their own reality anymore. He spots a mark on Rirui's arm that signals she has learned a Concubus skill to manipulate dreams. He realises that in feeling sympathy for Sekihime Rirui created a dream world where she can open her eyes. Able to see him, Sekihime realises Hajime is her ideal man, making Rirui jealous. Seeing Rirui trying not to show how upset she is Hajime decides to reject Sekihime's confession. This upsets her so much she loses control and starts petrifying things even with her eyes closed. Desperate, Hajime agrees to date her if he can touch her butt. Sekihime is so surprised by his perversion she leaves town immediately. Veronicas finds this hilarious and Hajime decides love is more complicated than he thought.
5	"What's Hatching"; Transliteration: "Fuka Shita mono wa" (Japanese: 孵化したものは)	Hye Jin Seo	Takayuki Yamazaki	Yui Miura	February 4, 2026
Rirui continues caring for the Good Luck egg and hatches a large bird Hajime identifies as a common Sparrow-flier, which Rirui names Dragon. Dragon's constant chirping proves to be dangerous while in dungeon, so they leave him in their room while they are adventuring. Rirui achieves level 3 but can't celebrate as they find Dragon ruined their room. Rirui tries to train Dragon to be useful. Hajime finds evidence of a dangerous Rabbit-bear that must be hunted. Tavern waitress Natalie falls ill and is sent home so Rirui insists she and Dragon will do all Natalie's chores. Dragon tries but has limited success at cleaning. Rirui learns Natalie respects adventurers a great deal and is proud to be able to support them, even if it is just providing clean rooms and hot meals. The Rabbit-bear remains elusive so Hajime considers hiring a Beaster to help him. Rirui learns Dragon is able to communicate with the thousands of native Sparrow-fliers and locate the Rabbit-bear in moments. After killing it Hajime admits Dragon does have a useful skill after all. Rirui worries Dragon might be more useful to Hajime than she is. The elf Tanya visits Veronica with the bad news her shop, Succubus' Wings, has gone out of business. Elsewhere, a woman with a grudge against Veronica swears revenge.
6	"Decisive Battle in the Dungeon Attack!"; Transliteration: "Kessen! Meikyū Kōryaku!" (Japanese: 決戦！迷宮攻略(ダンジョンアタック))	Kazuya Iwata & Shigeki Awai	Ikumi Nomura	Jō Tanaka	February 11, 2026
Tanya further explains the shop collapsed. Veronica manipulates Hajime to visit Yanago city with her. There, Veronica accuses her rival Jessie of sabotage, though it turns out a dragon crushed the shop. Jessie challenges her to a Dungeon Attack; if Veronica wins Jessie pays half the shop repair costs, if Jessie wins she gets Rishat, Veronica's masochist elf servant, with whom Jessie is in love. The challenge is to beat the boss monster of Gowen's Altar dungeon. While Veronica and Jessie squabble Dragon finds a secret tunnel to a chest where Rirui loots a robe and a magic staff that increases the power of her water magic so much she steals the boss kill from Jessie's guards and wins the Dungeon Attack by herself. Veronica's shop is rebuilt and Rirui is forced to pull Hajime away from Veronica's girls, reminding him he promised to buy Olive perfume from the city. After buying it Hajime decides to visit his friend Old Pom in the slums where he grew up. There, a thief steals Dragon, forcing Rirui to get him back with her staff. The commotion upsets gang boss Lotton, another of Hajime's friends who fortunately is still scared of him. Hajime also visits a community gravestone to remember his parents and other friends who died. Rirui takes part in rat fishing, a common way for slum children to earn pennies.
7	"Rirui and Cocko"; Transliteration: "Rirui to Kokko" (Japanese: リルイとコッコ)	Masahiro Takada	Takayuki Yamazaki	Kunihisa Sugishima	February 18, 2026
A scholar hires Hajime to escort him through the dungeon. Rirui and the scholar's daughter, Cocko, instantly dislike each other. Rirui is impressed the scholar explains his job is vital for spotting patterns, both profitable and dangerous. Rirui particularly likes the fact that slimes, under certain conditions, can drop jewels instead of eyeballs. The scholar admits he is a farmer but does research when he can to support his family. Cocko is upset when other adventurers mock him for being a Chicken Beaster, but feels better after overhearing Rirui praise his intelligence. The scholar is thrilled when Olive agrees to purchase his research, so he can afford to stay longer than planned. Hajime is given several small, annoying jobs so he leaves Rirui to help Olive and Anyango around the Guild. Rirui becomes upset as compared to Anyango she has a weak body and can't read or count. Olive assures her what she can do might be basic, but it is still important. As a reward Olive asks Hajime to send Rirui to school. There, Rirui is furious when Cocko is asked to teach her to read. Cocko is surprised Rirui takes the lessons seriously in order to be a more effective adventurer one day. The scholar is pleased Cocko has begun making friends.
8	"A Resident of the Village"; Transliteration: "Mura no Ichiin" (Japanese: 村の一員)	Yusuke Tomita	Ikumi Nomura	Yusuke Tomita	February 25, 2026
Jan from the village Watch warns Hajime not to go around acting important. Hajime realises Jan is in love with Natalie and resents Hajime living at her tavern. Jan swears to never accept Hajime, as he is still a newcomer and not considered part of the village yet. Olive reveals a quasi-calamity monster, the Spikesaurus, has appeared nearby. Such a monster would require a Silver rank adventurer party. As Hajime is a Pure Silver he is slightly stronger but remains cautious. Jan tries to mock him for cowardice but is thrown out by his father. Olive arranges to hire a silver rank party to work with Hajime. Jan and fellow Watch members Donato and Alisa decide to kill the monster themselves, so Hajime agrees to rescue them at the request of their worried parents. Despite Olive's disapproval, he takes Rirui who insists on staying with him. The spikesaurus almost kills Jan, but Hajime arrives in time and manages to kill it. Jan admits Hajime is worth admiring. A monster worm bursts from the ground underneath Rirui, biting off Hajime's left arm when he pushes her aside. Hajime uses his skill War God's Crimson Flow to tear off its head with only one hand. Rirui blames herself for Hajime losing his arm.
9	"After the Battle"; Transliteration: "Tatakai Akete" (Japanese: 戦い明けて)	Hye Jin Seo	Takayuki Yamazaki	Hatsuki Tsuji	March 4, 2026
Due to Hajime's value as a Pure Silver the main adventurer's guild demands Olive restore Hajime by any means. Hajime worries he hasn't seen Rirui since returning to the village. The chief of the dwarves offers Hajime a full prosthetic arm, funded by villagers' donations and the main guild. Realising Rirui thinks she ruined his career Hajime drags her on a herb gathering quest to prove he is still capable. Rirui promises to become strong enough to support him. Days pass and Hajime grows restless as he recovers. Veronica visits with Rishat to complete the quests Hajime can't take on until he recovers. The chief completes a prototype arm that functions as well as a normal arm, but delays completing the final version until he has added extra features. Hajime wonders if he is the best mentor for Rirui since their fighting and magic styles are so different. Since Rishat's style is similar to Rirui Hajime wonders if he could be Rirui's mentor. Hajime reveals his prosthetic has a rocket punch and a grappling hook, making adventuring easier than before. A wolf appears and Rishat reveals he is actually an archer and doesn't use swords. Hajime decides he will have to keep mentoring Rirui himself.
10	"A Haircut and a Decision"; Transliteration: "Sanpatsu to Sentaku" (Japanese: 散髪と選択)	Shunpei Umemoto	Ikumi Nomura & Takayuki Yamazaki	Shunpei Umemoto	March 11, 2026
As a child in the slums Veronica was often jealous of women with long, beautiful hair. Tanya is concerned Veronica is spending too much time adventuring in Komai when her shop is in Yanago. Rirui wants to control men like Veronica does, so Veronica advises growing her hair longer. She also insists on cutting Hajime's hair before it becomes untidy. Hajime falls asleep during the haircut, so Veronica leaves for the day. Wanting to be like Veronica, Rirui cuts more hair while he sleeps but does such a bad job she shaves him bald to cover it up. Hajime assumes it was Veronica and becomes furious. A Hawk-kite spider kidnaps Veronica so Hajime follows, intending to punish Veronica after rescuing her. Hajime is knocked into a canyon so Rirui searches for Veronica and finds her trapped in a spiderweb by her hair. The Hawk-kire returns, and though it pains her to do so, Veronica cuts her hair short to rescue Rirui. Hajime kills the Hawk-kite and while arguing with Veronica discovers it was Rirui that shaved him bald and punishes her instead. Veronica decides it is possible to be happy even without long hair and decides to stay an adventurer in Komai for a while yet.
11	"The Power of Charm"; Transliteration: "Miryō no Chikara" (Japanese: 魅了の力)	Yūki Nishiyama	Takayuki Yamazaki	Kunihisa Sugushima	March 18, 2026
Rirui is annoyed Hajime doesn't see her as a woman. Veronica tells Rirui about Mystic Eye that can temporarily charm men, but she refuses to use it on Hajime as it wouldn't be real love. Rirui decides to learn Mystic Eye, but when she kills a boar monster and Hajime praises her, she realises Veronica was right that it wouldn't be real love. Mystic Eye unlocks anyway after killing the boar, but it doesn't work on Hajime. The festival of the Deer God approaches so Rirui, Anyango and Cocko decide to run a stall selling meat from the dungeon. Hajime hopes Rirui has fun, since he was so poor as a child he couldn't take part in festivals. Monsters begin attacking at night but are killed by Hajime and the guards. Veronica explains Rirui is growing up, her ancient species blood is becoming more powerful and with the moon almost full her Mystic Eye has attracted monsters even while asleep. The problem worsens over several nights and while he kills all the monsters Hajime struggles with keeping the cause secret from the scared villagers and from Rirui herself.
12	"A Hometown and Friends"; Transliteration: "Furusato to Nakama" (Japanese: 故郷と仲間)	Kazuya Iwata	Takayuki Yamazaki	Jō Tanaka	March 25, 2026
While sleeping exhausted from killing monsters all night Hajime dreams of childhood friends Ricky and Booby. Booby had a dream of getting married while Ricky wanted to be an adventurer in a countryside village. Natalie notices Rirui's latest skill mark on her wrist glowing and fears it is related to the monster attacks and that Hajime is covering it up to protect Rirui. Olive is also worried about Hajime, so Natalie tells everyone about Rirui's mark. Hajime is surprised and grateful when everyone agrees to protect Rirui together. The morning of the full moon Rirui disappears so everyone begins searching for her. Rirui is shown hiding in the forest, having overheard the monster attacks are her fault and deciding to leave to protect everyone. Monsters are drawn to her even during the daytime, but the whole village arrives to protect her. Realising no one blames her, Rirui returns to the village to work at the meat stall for the festival. The Deer God himself grants Rirui a Lucky Star which Rirui decides is her best day ever.
