= Chanto Suki tte Ieru Ko Musō =

Japanese light novel series

- First light novel volume cover

ちゃんと好きって言える子無双
- Genre: Romantic comedy
- Light novel
- Written by: Nana Nanana
- Illustrated by: Ayaka Chihiro
- Published by: Media Factory
- Imprint: MF Bunko J
- Original run: October 25, 2024 – present
- Volumes: 4
- Manga
- Written by: Nana Nanana
- Illustrated by: Akakage
- Published by: ASCII Media Works
- Imprint: Dengeki Comics NEXT
- Magazine: Comic Dengeki Daioh "g"
- Original run: September 27, 2025 – present
- Volumes: 1

Chanto Suki tte Ieru Ko Musō (Japanese: ちゃんと好きって言える子無双; lit. 'The Girl Who Can Properly Say 'I Love You' Is Unstoppable') is a Japanese light novel series written by Nana Nanana and illustrated by Ayaka Chihiro. Media Factory began publishing it under its MF Bunko J imprint in October 2024, with four volumes released as of May 2026. A manga adaptation illustrated by Akakage began serialization in ASCII Media Works' Comic Dengeki Daioh "g" magazine in September 2025, and has been compiled into a single volume as of February 2026.

== Plot ==
Izumi Sumie, a second-year high school student, is the object of admiration of three girls: Amane Amasaki, a popular student and model whom he secretly tutors, Hakua Shiragiku, the student council president and his former fiancée, and Haru Kasuga, a first-year student whom he once saved from punks. All three have feelings for Izumi but have been unable to confess. However, things come to a head when they see Nanao Nanase, a new transfer student, confessing to Izumi. With the other girls feeling jealous about Nanao making the first move, the four girls start a battle for his affection, each racing to see who would confess to him.

== Characters ==
Izumi Sumie (澄江 和泉, Sumie Izumi)
A second-year high school student. He comes from a wealthy family and was originally support to inherit its leadership, but his inheritance was taken away from him. Despite his academic brilliance, he has average grades as he holds himself back on purpose to avoid raising expectations.
Nanao Nanase (七瀬 七緒, Nanase Nanao)
A second-year high school student who just transferred to Izumi's school. She fell in love with him after he helped her find her way when she got lost while working on her transfer paperwork. She also noticed his phone strap, which was the same as hers, which surprised the both of them as few others recognized the strap's character. She confesses her love to him, thus causing jealousy among the girls who were already in love with him.
Amane Amasaki (天崎 雨音, Amasaki Amane)
Izumi's classmate and a gyaru. She is a popular fashion model working under her designer father, as well as being the top student in class. Despite her reputation as an honor student, she has actually been secretly struggling with balancing her work and studies. This has led to her grades dropping and her risking either repeating or being forced to quit her modeling career. Because of this, Izumi offers to tutor her. She calls Izumi "Izumicchi".
Hakua Shiragiku (白菊 白亜, Shiragiku Hakua)
The student council president of Izumi's school and a third-year student. She is nicknamed "Ice Princess" due to her serious personality, having a reputation for rejecting confessions. She is the heiress of the Shiragiku Confectionery company. In junior high school, she was engaged to Izumi as they were both heirs to large companies, but the engagement was called off after he lost his status as heir. However, she never fell out of love with Izumi, even going as far as to move next door to his apartment so she could live close to him.
Haru Kasuga (春日 波留, Kasuga Haru)
A first-year student, who has a tsundere personality. She is nicknamed the "Little Devil". She and Izumi belong to the Literature Club, with they and Haru's friend Inori being the only members. Despite being a member of the Literature Club, she is more interested in gaming than reading. She is protective of Inori and claims not to want Izumi to come near her, knowing Inori's popularity among boys. However, she actually secretly has feelings for Izumi, dating back to when he once saved her from a group of punks.
Inori Doumoto (堂本 祈, Dōmoto Inori)
Haru's best friend and a fellow member of the Literature Club. She is popular among boys due to her cute personality, leading to her nickname "Little Angel".
Akina Myojo (明星 明那, Myōjō Akina)
The daughter of the Shiragiku family's secretary, whom Hakua recruits to help her win Izumi's affection.
Kasumi Sumie (澄江 香澄, Sumie Kasumi)
Izumi's younger sister. She is jealous of the multiple girls that have feelings for her brother, even going as far as trying to force Izumi to transfer to another school.
Hitomi Iketeru (池照 仁美, Iketeru Hitomi)
Izumi's co-worker at his part-time job, and an actress at a theater troupe.

== Media ==
=== Light novel ===
The series is written by Nana Nanana and features illustrations by Ayaka Chihiro. The first volume was published under Media Factory's MF Bunko J imprint on October 25, 2024; four volumes have been released as of May 25, 2026.

| No. | Release date | ISBN |
|---|---|---|
| 1 | October 25, 2024 | 978-4-04-684170-4 |
| 2 | February 25, 2025 | 978-4-04-684668-6 |
| 3 | October 24, 2025 | 978-4-04-685080-5 |
| 4 | May 25, 2026 | 978-4-04-660158-2 |
| 5 | November 25, 2026 | 978-4-04-660646-4 |

=== Manga ===
A manga adaptation illustrated by Akakage began serialization in ASCII Media Works' Comic Dengeki Daioh "g" magazine on September 27, 2025. The first tankōbon volume was released on February 27, 2026.

| No. | Release date | ISBN |
|---|---|---|
| 1 | February 27, 2026 | 978-4-04-952097-2 |
| 2 | November 27, 2026 | 978-4-04-952571-7 |

== Reception ==
The manga adapation was nominated for the 2026 Next Manga Award in the print category.

== See also ==
- Can a Boy-Girl Friendship Survive?, another light novel series by the same author
