= The World's Strongest Witch =

Japanese light novel series

- First light novel volume cover, featuring Lorna Hermit

世界最強の魔女、始めました ～私だけ『攻略サイト』を見れる世界で自由に生きます～ (Sekai Saikyō no Majo, Hajimemashita: Watashi Dake "Kōryaku Saito" o Mireru Sekai de Jiyū ni Ikimasu)
- Genre: Fantasy, Comedy
- Novel series
- Written by: Sakaki Mochimaru
- Published by: Shōsetsuka ni Narō; Kakuyomu
- Original run: May 2, 2022 – July 3, 2026
- Light novel
- Written by: Sakaki Mochimaru
- Illustrated by: Riritto
- Published by: Square Enix
- English publisher: NA: Yen Press
- Imprint: SQEX Novel
- Original run: December 7, 2022 – October 7, 2026
- Volumes: 6
- Manga
- Written by: Sakaki Mochimaru
- Illustrated by: Tamaki Toga
- Published by: Kodansha
- Imprint: Monthly Shōnen Magazine Comics
- Magazine: Monthly Magazine Base
- Original run: May 26, 2023 – present
- Volumes: 14
- Anime television series
- Directed by: Jōji Furuta
- Written by: Shōji Yonemura
- Music by: Alisa Okehazama; Ryoshi Takagi
- Studio: Bridge; Aisle
- Licensed by: Crunchyroll; SEA: Muse Communication
- Original network: Tokyo MX, BS11, TVA
- Original run: October 7, 2026 – present
- Episodes: 7
- icon

The World's Strongest Witch (Note: Japanese: 世界最強の魔女、始めました ～私だけ『攻略サイト』を見れる世界で自由に生きます～, Hepburn: Sekai Saikyō no Majo, Hajimemashita: Watashi Dake "Kōryaku Saito" o Mireru Sekai de Jiyū ni Ikimasu) is a Japanese web novel series written by Mochimaru Sakaki. It originally began serialization on the online publication platforms Shōsetsuka ni Narō and Kakuyomu in May 2022, before being published as a light novel by Square Enix under its SQEX Novel imprint; six volumes featuring illustrations by Riritto were released from December 2022 to October 2026. A manga adaptation illustrated by Tamaki Toga began serialization on Kodansha's Monthly Magazine Base service in May 2023. An anime television series adaptation produced by Bridge and Aisle premiered in October 2026.

== Plot ==
Lorna Hermit, a member of an aristocratic family, was kicked out by her family after manifesting what was seen as a "useless" SSS-rank skill. Finding herself outside for the first time, she discovers that her new skill, "Internet", allows her to access the real world's Internet and look up information about her world. She is also gifted a powerful magic staff by a mysterious spirit. Armed with her new knowledge, she suddenly becomes very powerful, now knowing how to collect useful weapons and skills. Lorna now has to learn how to deal with both her impressive access to knowledge and her newfound strength, despite her desire to live a peaceful life.

== Characters ==
Lorna Hermit (ローナ・ハーミット, Rōna Hāmitto)
Voiced by: Azusa Tachibana (Japanese); Lindsay Seidel (English)
A member of the Gugrekas family, who was banished after they believed that her skill was worthless, possibly G-rank or lower. She sees her banishment as a blessing in disguise, as she had been a shut-in while living with the Gugrekas family and thus had been unable to go outside. Her new surname Hermit was her late mother's family name. Her skill "Internet" allows her to search for information from Earth about her world, letting her beat quests and find places. Early in her quest, she is gifted a powerful staff that not only boosts her skills, but also causes various things to happen in her world.
Reinhardt Highwind (ラインハルテ・ハイウィンド, Rainharuto Haiwindo)
Voiced by: Yūto Uemura
An adventurer who just quit his job as a guard in Ifone Town. He was previously an adventurer until he took an arrow to the knee, leading to him working as a gatekeeper. During their encounter, Lorna heals his knee, allowing him to take up adventuring again. He is the one who first suggests to Lorna that she join a guild.
Elmina Manaflame (エリミナ・マナフレイム, Erimina Manafureimu)
Voiced by: Fairouz Ai
A guild master and the personal magician of the Gugrekas family. She first tried to sabotage Lorna under orders from Lorna's father, but after Lorna passed her tests with ease and after she saw how powerful Lorna is, she grew fearful of her.
Erna (エルナ, Eruna)
Voiced by: Honoka Inoue
An elf princess and Elhaur's daughter, who tasks Lorna with helping her save Elhaur and the Elf Village from a disease caused by Zariche. The villagers believe that Lorna is the chosen one destined to save them. She had earlier tried but failed to find ingredients to make medicine for Elhaur. Luckily, Lorna helps to successfully cure her mother and expose Zariche's scheme. She still respects Lorna even after learning that her family tried to wipe out the elves.
Elhaur (エルハゥル, Eruhauru)
Voiced by: Yukana
Erna's mother and the queen of the Elf Village. She suffers from a mysterious illness, which turns out to be the work of the local doctor Zariche Venomgarden, who was secretly collaborating with Lorna's family, but is healed by Lorna's medicine. Like her daughter, she still respects Lorna even after learning that she is a Gugrekas.
Aries Tear Bluemoon (アリエス・ティア・ブルームーン, Ariesu Tia Burūmūn)
Voiced by: Kana Hanazawa
A guild master from Aquas, who appears to really like Lorna. Her city was threatened by monster attacks that occur every Wednesday, but Lorna helps resolve this by creating a wall to keep monsters out of Aquas. This leads Aries to believe that she is an angel and now dotes on her.
Ruru Ru Rie (ルル・ル・リエー, Ruru Ru Riē)
Voiced by: Maria Naganawa
Yggdrasil (ユグドラシル, Yugodorashiru)
Voiced by: Nana Mizuki (Japanese); Mikaela Krantz (English)
A forest spirit who gifted Lorna her magic staff before leaving to reunite with an unknown person.
Zariche Venomgarden (ザリチェ)
Voiced by: Azusa Tadokoro
An elf doctor who is secretly poisoning her own people in her village to force them to buy her medicines and take over the world. She worked with Lorna's father to eliminate her own kind, but also secretly plans to betray him and his family. However, Lorna thwarts her plan, forcing her to admit defeat and apologize to the citizens of the Elf Village for her behavior.
Dwargo
A blacksmith from Aquas, who stopped forging for the guild after being banished for making a dangerous sword. Lorna is able to help convince him to start forging again.

== Media ==
=== Light novels ===
Sakaki Mochimaru originally began posting the series as a web novel on the online publication platform Shōsetsuka ni Narō on May 2, 2022, with serialization on Kadokawa's online platform Kakuyomu beginning on the same day. It was later picked up for publication by Square Enix, which published it as a light novel under its SQEX Novel imprint featuring illustrations by Riritto. Six volumes were released from December 7, 2022 to October 7, 2026. The novels are licensed in English by Yen Press, which released its first English volume on August 26, 2025.

No.	Original release date	Original ISBN	North American release date	North American ISBN
1	December 7, 2022	978-4-7575-8303-0	August 26, 2025	979-8-8554-1436-3
2	April 7, 2023	978-4-7575-8517-1	April 14, 2026	979-8-8554-1438-7
3	September 7, 2023	978-4-7575-8780-9	November 10, 2026	979-8-8554-1439-4
4	August 6, 2024	978-4-7575-9346-6	—	—
5	May 7, 2025	978-4-7575-9843-0	—	—
6	October 7, 2026	978-4-3010-0801-9	—	—

=== Manga ===
A manga adaptation illustrated by Tamaki Toga began serialization on Kodansha's Monthly Magazine Base web service on May 26, 2023. The first tankōbon volume was released on September 8, 2023; fourteen volumes have been released as of October 8, 2026.

No.	Release date	ISBN
1	September 8, 2023	978-4-06-532778-4
2	November 9, 2023	978-4-06-533412-6
3	February 8, 2024	978-4-06-534881-9
4	May 9, 2024	978-4-06-535620-3
5	August 7, 2024	978-4-06-536089-7
6	November 8, 2024	978-4-06-537786-4
7	February 7, 2025	978-4-06-538220-2
8	May 9, 2025	978-4-06-539265-2
9	August 7, 2025	978-4-06-540115-6
10	November 7, 2025	978-4-06-541511-5
11	February 9, 2026	978-4-06-542243-4
12	May 8, 2026	978-4-06-543249-5
13	August 7, 2026	978-4-06-544299-9
14	October 8, 2026	978-4-06-544822-9
15	December 9, 2026	978-4-06-545691-0

=== Anime ===
An anime television series adaptation was announced on May 1, 2026. The series is produced by Bridge and Aisle and directed by Jōji Furuta, with Shōji Yonemura handling series composition, Yūki Morimoto designing the characters, and Alisa Okehazama and Ryoshi Takagi composing the music. It premiered on October 7, 2026, on Tokyo MX and other networks. The opening theme song is "Eikyōryoku∞Idol" (影響力∞アイドル; 'Infinitely Influential Idol'), performed by HoneyWorks featuring HaKoniwalily, and the ending theme song is "Hoshi o Muguru" (星を巡る; 'Traversing the Stars'), performed by Rokudenashi. Crunchyroll is streaming the series. Muse Communication licensed the series in Southeast Asia.

==== Episodes ====
No.	Title	Directed by	Written by		Original release date
1	"I Tried Using the Internet!"; Transliteration: "Intānetto o Tsukatte Mita!" (Japanese: インターネットを使ってみた！)	Unknown	Unknown	TBA	October 7, 2026
After being disowned by her Guugelheit family for inheriting a supposedly useless skill called Internet, Lorna Hermit is happy to finally gain freedom as her mother would've wanted. Fighting a slime, Lorna discovers her new skill is an SSS Rank skill that gives her access to the real world's Internet. She soon discovers a strategy guide wiki with lots of information about her world. Using an online map of Ipple woods just outside the Guugelheit mansion, and after dealing with pop-up ads, Lorna discovers a secret area where she meets Yggdrasil, the spirit of the World Tree. Via Internet, she finds a password which lets her skip an entire quest line. Yggdrasil gifts her the Staff of the World Tree, an extremely powerful late-game staff, then disappears. Having no experience at all, Lorna accidentally destroys the woods with the staff, gaining massive EXP, level ups and acquired titles by slaying every nearby monster in the explosion. Lorna also collects some special herbs to sell. Lorna's family are furious after the Ipple Woods Ley Line, the source of their power, disappears. They suspect a Demon Lord was responsible, unaware that it was really Lorna, and fear telling the King in case he blames them.
2	"I Tried Becoming an Adventurer!"; Transliteration: "Bōkensha ni Nattemita!" (Japanese: 冒(ぼう)険(けん)者(しゃ)になってみた！)	Unknown	Unknown	TBA	October 14, 2026
Lorna equips looted Reckless Boots to double her running speed, unaware her recent level-ups pushed her natural running speed past 350 mph. Doubled to over 700 mph, she reaches Aiphone Town in seconds, nearly dying when she crashes. At the gates, retired adventurer Reinharte the Swift, who is now working as a guard, checks Lorna's status with a magic tablet. Seeing Lorna is Level 22 with 90,000 magic points, he and Lorna assume the tablet is broken and Reinharte suggests she join the Adventurer’s Guild to get an official ID. Saddened by losing his former career as an adventurer, Reinharte is amazed when Lorna casts a healing spell that cures his career-ending knee injury. Lorna ignores panicking locals fleeing the events she caused in Ipple Woods, and heads to the guild. Unbeknownst to Lorna, her father has bribed guild master Elmina Manaflame to brutally fail Lorna's entrance exam. However, upon sensing Lorna’s terrifying Demon Lord aura and massive mana pool, Elmina panics, baffled how House Guugelheit could possibly believe Lorna was useless. Desperate to avoid angering the Guugelheits, or having to fight Lorna, Elmina ultimately schedules the exam in the deadly Twilight Temple, confident the hazardous environment will cause Lorna to fail without requiring sabotage.
3	"I Tried Looking At Message Boards!"; Transliteration: "Keijiban o Mite Mita!" (Japanese: 掲示板を見てみた！)	Unknown	Unknown	TBA	October 21, 2026
Aware that Elmina is a Guugelheit mage, Lorna wonders why she is treating her kindly. As she sends adventurers into the dungeon, Elmina assigns Lorna the "easy" task of retrieving the Dungeon Core from the ninth level, even though no one has yet figured out how to open the door to level three. Feeling lazy, Lorna consults a guide using Internet to find all the treasure, avoid monsters, and open all the doors. Elmina's butler isn't happy with her actions, but Elmina assures him that Lorna will fail the challenge and believes that she had trapped Lorna inside the dungeon with no way out before leaving. Upon reaching the ninth level and doing some analysis, Lorna encounters the dungeon boss, a dragon. Panicking, she searches for another guide and discovers a safe spot out of reach of its fire breath. Using repeated ranged attacks, she defeats the dragon, reaching Level 40 and earning Apocalypse Dragon Robes that grant flight. Elmina discovers Lorna's actions while searching the dungeon. Lorna returns to Elmina with the core, who is terrified as Lorna's level has almost doubled from 22 to 40 in just a few hours. Fearing Lorna more than the Guugelheits, Elmina passes her. Lorna warns Elmina that she will die soon, helpful advice based on Internet telling her when Elmina dies in the story, though Elmina misinterprets it as a threat and decides to stay clear of Lorna from now on. Promoted to Silver Rank, Lorna reunites with Reinharte, who becomes convinced that Lorna is an angel after seeing her fly. Meanwhile, Elmina cowers in her house, convinced that Lorna is a Demon Lord.
4	"I Tried Stopping Someone's Ambition!"; Transliteration: "Dareka no Yabō o Tomeyou to Shite Mita!" (Japanese: 誰かの野望を止めようとしてみた！)	TBA	TBA	TBA	October 28, 2026
Lorna discovers that she can post messages through Internet, assuming she is communicating with the Gods. She asks for ways to earn money in Aiphone, but mostly receives confusing replies from perverts and otaku. However, a user named Anon-Swordsman reveals an exploit, allowing her to infinitely farm Phantom Leaf herbs in Ipple Woods. After rescuing the elf Princess Erna from wolves, Lorna is mistaken for a mythical Savior pretending to be a normal person and is asked to save Erna’s plague-stricken village and mother Queen Elhaur. Erna brings Lorna to her village, but the elves are wary of Lorna due to the damages that she unintentionally caused in the Ipple forest earlier, but Erna is able to convince them of who she really is. Heading to the elf castle, they meet Elhaur, who can see her Internet ability and in the care of an elf healer named Zariche, who has been secretly in contact with Lorna's father. It is revealed that following Elmina's failure to cure her mother, Lorna’s father dispatched Zariche and she claims that the elves will die without a rare ingredient, but the elves don't know that she was secretly poisoning them to force medicine sales, all while cultivating a large flower called the Queen's Heart Rose for world domination and also plans to double cross the Guugelheits. When Zariche returns to the village, she discovers that Lorna used Phantom Leaves to craft the Secret Elven Remedy, permanently curing the elves and exposing Zariche's scheme. Zariche flees to her greenhouse to activate the Queen's Heart Rose's hypnosis pollen, but Lorna pursues her. Prepared by advice from Internet, Lorna uses a glitched Substitution doll to neutralize the Queen's Heart Rose's pollen and uses Flight to bypass plant monsters. Realizing that Zariche and the Guugelheits orchestrated the elves' attempted extermination upon overhearing Zariche communicating with her father, a furious Lorna burns the Queen's Heart Rose, forcing Zariche to surrender.
5	"I Tried Quitting Being a Savior!"; Transliteration: "Kyūseishu Yametemita!" (Japanese: 救世主やめてみた！)	TBA	TBA	TBA	November 4, 2026
After exposing Zariche's plot to the elves, Erna asks Lorna to share her adventures of earning the World Tree Staff. Feeling guilty about using the Internet to cheat for the password, Lorna confesses to being a former Guugelheit member and offers to return it. However, Elhaur insists she earned the staff by stopping Zariche and saving the world. Lorna introduces them to the Internet, where they mistaken web slang for divine language. Before she departs, Elhaur gives her an elven necklace so human nobles will know to respect her. Sometime later, when Elmina tries fleeing at night, Lorna catches her and offers a crown dropped by the destroyed Queen’s Heart as a gift. Elmina misinterprets this as Lorna usurping Elhaur's throne. Terrified, she refuses the crown but buys Lorna’s Phantom Leaves for 5 million gold, delighted that Lorna is leaving to travel, but is then terrified anew when Lorna promises to return. Meanwhile, Elhaur and royal knights arrest Lorna’s father and brother for crimes against elves thanks to Lorna revealing a secret passageway to their manor to Elhaur, who reveals to Lorna's father how powerful his daughter actually is. Elsewhere, Twilight Dragon Cult Bishops discuss how Lorna thwarted the Guugelheits, Elmina, and Zariche, delaying the unsealing of Apocalypse Dragon Ragnadrek. Lorna then casually wanders into their hidden church using Internet navigation. Baffled by her immense mana and recognizing her Ragnarobe, worn by Ragnadrek whom Lorna unknowingly already defeated, they mistake her for Ragnadrek and pledge loyalty. Thinking that she made friends, Lorna teaches them to make mayonnaise, which they view as a secret long-lasting army ration, then accidentally shows them eroge scenes through Internet.
6	"I Tried Becoming a God!"; Transliteration: "Kami ni Natte Mita!" (Japanese: 神になってみた！)	TBA	TBA	TBA	November 11, 2026
Armed with the secret to mayonnaise, the Bishops allow Lorna to summon them whenever she needs them and give her a stone that can summon them. They also develop a newfound respect for Lorna. Lorna visits Aquas, a seaside city, where guards warn her to leave before midnight, as tomorrow is Wednesday. Exploring, she finds shops closed and locals fleeing from Wednesday. Via Internet, Lorna learns Aquas is swarmed by sea monsters every Wednesday, a loot farming event for players, but a weekly nightmare for residents. She then decides to visit the guild, hoping to be recruited there. Guildmaster Aries explains that a year of these weekly monster raids destroyed the local economy, driving away merchants and adventurers alike. Only a few adventurers still attempt to lift the curse every week, and Aries urges Lorna not to bother getting involved. Deciding to depart, Lorna gifts them gathered supplies. Realizing that she survived the treacherous Thundermarshes to gain such supplies, Aries resorts to shameless flattery to recruit her. Lorna, Aries, and the adventurers then head down to the beach to fight the monsters emerging from the ocean. Eager to help, Lorna uses the Queen's Heart Crown to attract and wipe out the monsters. She slays Gigalodon, Lord of the Coast, without even realizing it was an area boss, earning the title "Slayer of the Coastal Lord." After healing an injured adventurer, a large crab monster appears next. To finish, she summons a massive wall spanning the entire coastline to keep the monsters out. The guild is stunned: Lorna not only eliminated the area boss terrorizing them for a year, but her wall might have permanently ended the Wednesday curse. Aries wonders if Lorna is an angel sent by God.
7	"I Tried Making a Secret Weapon"; Transliteration: "Himitsu Heiki o Tsukutte Mita" (Japanese: 秘密兵器を作ってみた)	TBA	TBA	TBA	November 18, 2026
Aries is grateful of Lorna's help. Because they are short on guild workers, Lorna summons the six bishops using the stone that she got from them, terrifying Aries. Blacksmith Dwargo refuses to forge for them; having been banished by the King of Dongowa for forging an S rank sword that he was unaware is stronger than A rank. With hints from Internet, Lorna speed-runs his dialogue using specific trigger words, compelling him to restore the rusted S-rank sword, Deathblade Kiru Ichimonji. Claiming she wants to avoid magical catastrophes from her staff, Lorna tests the blade, accidentally unleashing a cleaving attack that destroys Dwargo's shop and earns her the title Tyrant of Destruction; Dwargo isn't too upset as he had planned to remodel the shop anyway. Reinspired, Dwargo resumes forging for the guild, though Lorna secretly only wanted the sword to cut stone blocks. Lorna builds a massive "Trap Tower" on the other side of the wall. Wednesday morning arrives and Aries helps prepare the surviving townsfolk for battle, yet Wednesday is unstoppable, but the monsters instead spawn atop Lorna’s Trap Tower and plummet to their deaths. She explains to a baffled Aries that she exploited "game mechanics" by building over the "spawn point" to trigger "fall damage", killing the monsters automatically and permanently solving the Wednesday crisis. Aquas celebrates, and Lorna impresses the bishops by making tartar sauce from mayonnaise. She is also given a new outfit. Crediting the "Internet Gods" for the idea of building the tower further convinces Aries that Lorna is an angel, and she becomes obsessive with Lorna. That night, Lorna’s quest rewards unlock: Fast Travel to previously visited locations; and Water Mirror Aegis, which reflects magic attacks at double damage. Testing Fast Travel, Lorna- misinterprets the warning against using the skill indoors and launches herself straight into the ceiling.
