= Hakoniwalily =

Japanese female duo

- Hanon (left) and Kotoha (right) in 2026

Background information
- Also known as: HoneyWorks feat. Hakoniwalily; Hakolily; Hanilily
- Genre: J-pop
- Years active: 2019–present
- Label: HoneyWorks
- Members: Hanon; Kotoha
- Website: hakoniwalily.jp

Hakoniwalily, (Note: Japanese: ハコニワリリィ, Hepburn: Hakoniwariryi; stylized as HaKoniwalily and sometimes shorten to Hakolily; formerly known as Hanon×Kotoha) also known as HoneyWorks feat. Hakoniwalily, (Note: sometimes shorten to Hanilily (ハニリリ)) is a Japanese female duo composed of Hanon and Kotoha. Their music was produced by HoneyWorks.

== History ==
Promotional video of Koi-iro Dōmei's release

Hanon joined HoneyWorks as a supporting vocalist. A year later, Kotoha, who posted herself singing on the internet, was asked to join HoneyWorks as a supporting vocalist. They discussed forming a duo and worked with HoneyWorks. They started as a female duo, uploading videos on YouTube under the name Hanon×Kotoha. HoneyWorks handled their music production. They released their first album Koi-iro Dōmei (恋色同盟) in December 2019. Their second album Suisei Shōjo (水声少女) was released in October 2020. They had a major debut on September 1, 2021 and changed their name to Hakoniwalily, following the release of their single "Koganezora". They begun releasing song produced by Honeyworks under the name HoneyWorks feat. Hakoniwalily. They performed the ending theme of the 2022 anime Aharen-san wa Hakarenai. They released their first major album Lily’s Plage on September 28, 2022. They released their first album Flourite (フローライト) under the name HoneyWorks feat. Hakoniwalily on March 11, 2026.

They performed the opening theme of the various anime such as 365 Days to the Wedding (2024),, Can a Boy-Girl Friendship Survive? (2025), The World's Strongest Witch (2026). They also performed the ending theme anime such as A Ninja and an Assassin Under One Roof (2025), Kaiju Girl Caramelise (2026). The two also performed the both the opening and ending theme of the 2026 anime The Daily Life of a Single 29-Year-Old Adventurer, in which Hanon performed the opening and Kotoha performed the ending theme.

== Artistry ==
Oricon described the duo as having "matching contrasting personalities", adding that Hanon is highly regarded for her singing ability, while Kotoha has a "clear, transparent voice."

== Discography ==
=== Albums ===
| Title | Release date | Peak ranking | |
| Title | Release date | JPN Hot | JPN Cmb |
|---|---|---|---|
| Koi-iro Dōmei (as Hanon×Kotoha) | December 19, 2019 | — | — |
| Suisei Shōjo (as Hanon×Kotoha) | October 10, 2020 | — | — |
| Lily's Plage (as Hakoniwalily) | September 28, 2022 | 28 | 36 |
| Flourite (as Honeyworks feat. Hakoniwalily | March 11, 2026 | — | — |
