= Can a Boy-Girl Friendship Survive? =

Japanese light novel series and its adaptations

- First light novel volume cover, featuring Himari Inuzuka

男女の友情は成立する？（いや、しないっ!!） (Danjo no Yūjō wa Seiritsu Suru? (Iya, Shinai!!))
- Genre: Romantic comedy
- Light novel
- Written by: Nana Nanana
- Illustrated by: Parum
- Published by: ASCII Media Works
- Imprint: Dengeki Bunko
- Original run: January 9, 2021 – November 8, 2025
- Volumes: 12 (Note: Fifteen volumes in total, including the second part of the fourth volume and two side stories collections.)
- Manga
- Written by: Nana Nanana
- Illustrated by: Kamelie
- Published by: ASCII Media Works
- Magazine: Dengeki Daioh
- Original run: August 27, 2021 – present
- Volumes: 6
- Anime television series
- Directed by: Yōhei Suzuki
- Written by: Nozu Yaemori
- Music by: Jun Ichikawa
- Studio: J.C.Staff
- Licensed by: Crunchyroll; SEA: Plus Media Networks Asia
- Original network: Tokyo MX, BS Asahi, Kansai TV, UMK, AT-X
- Original run: April 4, 2025 – June 20, 2025
- Episodes: 12
- icon

Can a Boy-Girl Friendship Survive? (Note: Japanese: 男女の友情は成立する？（いや、しないっ!!）, Hepburn: Danjo no Yūjō wa Seiritsu Suru? (Iya, Shinai!!); lit. 'Can a Boy–Girl Friendship Hold Up? (No, It Can't!!)', also known as Danjoru? (だんじょる？)) is a Japanese light novel series written by Nana Nanana and illustrated by Parum. It was published in twelve volumes from January 2021 to November 2025 under ASCII Media Works' Dengeki Bunko imprint. A manga adaptation illustrated by Kamelie has been serialized in ASCII Media Works' shōnen manga magazine Dengeki Daioh since August 2021, with its chapters collected into six tankōbon volumes as of April 2026. An anime television series adaptation produced by J.C.Staff aired from April to June 2025.

== Plot ==
Yu Natsume and Himari Inuzuka, two middle school best friends, felt close but promised to stay as friends, both knowing of Yu's feelings for their friend Rion Enomoto. Years after their promise, the two find themselves as members of the Gardening Club in high school, with them finding their feelings for each other becoming more complicated. Their friendship is tested when they are reunited with Rion in high school, with Himari now having to confront her growing feelings for Yu, while Yu is torn between his past and present.

== Characters ==
Yu Natsume (夏目 悠宇, Natsume Yū)
Voiced by: Kōichi Kamiki (voice drama), Kikunosuke Toya (anime)
A member of the gardening club, he is good friends with Himari. He has an interest in gardening and hopes to become a flower accessory maker and open his own shop. Over the course of the series, he realises he has feelings for Himari but hesitates to confess due to a promise they made to each other in middle school to remain as best friends. Initially, he was in love with Rion, but following their reunion, he starts to believe he has no feelings for her anymore and desperately wants to distance himself from her in hopes for starting an official relationship with Himari, but Rion's constant advances towards him leave him more frustrated and confused, despite him constantly rejecting her.
Himari Inuzuka (犬塚 日葵, Inuzuka Himari)
Voiced by: Tomomi Mineuchi (voice drama), Sayumi Suzushiro (anime)
A fellow member of the gardening club, she has been Yu's best friend since middle school and always helps promote his flower accessories on social media. As time passes, she realises her feelings for Yu but has trouble expressing them. The only person she seems to fear is her older brother, Hibari. She also becomes Rion's rival as they both compete for Yu's affections. A running gag in the series is her laughing and exclaiming "Bwa-ha!" out loud whenever Yu takes her jokes seriously. Later in the story, she and Yu start dating, but they break up after a short time.
Rion Enomoto (榎本 凛音, Enomoto Rion)
Voiced by: Yuka Nukui
Yu's childhood friend and first crush. She is also childhood friends with Shinji and Himari. Her older sister Kureha is a model who helped promote Yu's accessories back in middle school leading to Rion getting a bracelet, which she realized Yu had made when she reunited with him and after seeing Himari's posts. Though initially oblivious to Yu's feelings, she realizes she fully reciprocates them after their reunion, but is frustrated when Yu continuously rejects her and tells her he wants to move on from her. Because of this, she and Himari become heated rivals for Yu's affections, leaving him baffled. She and Yu later become a couple after he breaks up with Himari.
Shinji Makishima (真木島 慎司, Makishima Shinji)
Voiced by: Kō Bonkobara
One of Yu's only other friends who calls him "Natsu" and a childhood friend of Rion. He is a serial womanizer and is frequently seen holding a folding fan. He and Himari used to date in middle school, but they are now often seen at odds with one another ever since they broke up. Despite his demeanour, he placed top of the class in exams. He has resolved to help Rion get together with Yu in order to repay an unspecified debt he owes her, even though Yu constantly makes it clear he does not want to be with Rion.
Hibari Inuzuka (犬塚 雲雀, Inuzuka Hibari)
Voiced by: Masaaki Mizunaka
Himari's older brother who does not like when she acts up. He is extremely fond of Yu, and considers him as his own little brother. He seems to have a complicated relationship with Rion's older sister Kureha (revealed that they are exes) after Himari begged him to ask her to help promote Yu's flower accessories back in middle school. Despite being harsh on Himari, he has her best interests in mind and helps her make sense of the changing dynamic between her and Yu.
Sakura Natsume (夏目 咲良, Natsume Sakura)
Voiced by: Hisako Kanemoto
Yu's older sister. She currently works at a convenience store run by the family which Yu is set to inherit if he does not succeed in opening his own flower accessory shop by the time he turns 30. She, Hibari and Kureha, were all classmates back in their high school years, and they sometimes still meet and hang out together.

== Media ==
=== Light novel ===
Written by Nana Nanana and illustrated by Parum, Can a Boy-Girl Friendship Survive? began its publication on January 9, 2021, under ASCII Media Works' Dengeki Bunko imprint. Twelve volumes were released from January 2021 to November 2025.

No.	Title	Japanese release date	Japanese ISBN
1	Ja, 30 ni natte mo dokushindattara atashi ni shi toki na yo? (じゃあ、30になっても独身だったらアタシにしときなよ？; Well, if you're still single when you're 30, you should marry me, okay?)	January 9, 2021	978-4-04-913372-1
2	Jā, hontoni atashi to tsukiatchau? (じゃあ、ほんとにアタシと付き合っちゃう？; So, will you really go out with me?)	April 9, 2021	978-4-04-913735-4
3	Jā, zutto atashi dake mite kureru? (じゃあ、ずっとアタシだけ見てくれる？; Then, will you just keep looking at me?)	August 6, 2021	978-4-04-913832-0
4a	Demo, watashi-tachi shin'yūda yo ne? 〈Ue〉 (でも、わたしたち親友だよね？〈上〉; But we're best friends, right?)	December 10, 2021	978-4-04-914032-3
4b	Demo, watashi-tachi shin'yūda yo ne? 〈Shita〉 (でも、わたしたち親友だよね？〈下〉; But we're best friends, right?)	March 10, 2022	978-4-04-914228-0
5	Jā, mada 30 ni nattenaikedo atashi ni shi toko? (じゃあ、まだ30になってないけどアタシにしとこ？; Well then, even though I'm not 30 yet, should I go with you?)	August 10, 2022	978-4-04-914454-3
6	Jā, ima no mama no atashi ja damena no? (じゃあ、今のままのアタシじゃダメなの？; So, is it not good enough the way I am now?)	January 7, 2023	978-4-04-914579-3
7	Demo, koibitona ndakara atashi no koto ga 1-banda yo ne? (でも、恋人なんだからアタシのことが1番だよね？; But, since we're lovers, I come first, right?)	August 10, 2023	978-4-04-914868-8
8	Senpai ga dōshitemo tte onegai surunara īdesu yo? (センパイがどうしてもってお願いするならいいですよ？; If you really want to do it, senpai, it's okay.)	April 10, 2024	978-4-04-915134-3
9	Ano ne, kore de saigo ni surukara kono ryokō no ma dake watashi o kanojo ni shite? (あのね、これで最後にするからこの旅行の間だけわたしを彼女にして？; Hey, this will be the last time, so can I be your girlfriend just for the duration of this trip?)	August 9, 2024	978-4-04-915703-1
10	Kisamagotoki ni yūjin-men sa reru yō ni natte wa o shimaida na? (貴様ごときに友人面されるようになってはお終いだな？; If someone like you is trying to pretend to be my friend, then it's all over for me, right?)	December 10, 2024	978-4-04-916089-5
11	Jā, atashi to issho ni i rarenaku natte mo shinji tsudzukete kureru? (じゃあ、アタシと一緒にいられなくなっても信じ続けてくれる？; So, even if you can't be with me, will you still believe in me?)	April 10, 2025	978-4-04-916236-3
SS1	Purikueru tu Bōizu ando Gāruzu! (ぷりくえる とぅ ぼーいず あんど がーるず！; Prequel to Boys and Girls!)	May 10, 2025	978-4-04-916237-0
SS2	Natsume Sakura no seishun giji-roku (夏目咲良の青春疑似録; Sakura Natsume's Youthful Pseudo-Record)	June 10, 2025	978-4-04-916238-7
12	Soredemo, zutto zutto issho ni īyō ne! (それでも、ずっとずぅ～っと一緒にいようねっ！; Even So, Let's Stay Together Forever!)	November 8, 2025	978-4-04-916239-4

=== Manga ===
A manga adaptation illustrated by Kamelie began serialization in ASCII Media Works' Dengeki Daioh magazine on August 27, 2021. The first volume was released on May 9, 2022. It has been compiled in six tankōbon volumes as of April 10, 2026.

No.	Japanese release date	Japanese ISBN
1	May 9, 2022	978-4-04-914434-5
2	March 10, 2023	978-4-04-914960-9
3	December 8, 2023	978-4-04-915402-3
4	November 27, 2024	978-4-04-916066-6
5	June 27, 2025	978-4-04-916451-0
6	April 10, 2026	978-4-04-952159-7

=== Anime ===
In August 2022, it was announced that the series would be receiving an anime adaptation. It was later revealed to be a television series that is produced by J.C.Staff and directed by Yōhei Suzuki, with series composition and episode screenplays by Nozu Yaemori, characters designed by Natsuki Ōyama, and music composed by Jun Ichikawa. The series aired from April 4 to June 20, 2025, on Tokyo MX, AT-X, and other networks. The opening theme song is "Shitsumon, Koitte Nandeshō ka?" (質問、恋って何でしょうか?; Question: What is Love?), performed by HoneyWorks feat. HaKoniwalily, and the ending theme song is "Dear My Soleil", performed by Hina Tachibana. Crunchyroll is streaming the series. Plus Media Networks Asia licensed the series in Southeast Asia and broadcasts it on Aniplus Asia.

==== Episodes ====
No.	Title	Directed by (Note: Production staff information is taken from the ending credits of each episode.)	Storyboarded by	Original release date
1	"Anemone Flaccida and Queen of the Night"; Transliteration: "Nirinsō to Gekka Bijin" (Japanese: ニリンソウと月下美人)	Shūji Miyazaki	Yōhei Suzuki	April 4, 2025
Yu dreams of owning his own flower accessory shop. His parents agree to let him follow his dream if he can sell 100 accessories at his 8th grade school festival. He receives the unexpected help of popular girl Himari, who ensures the other girls buy everything he has. Two years later Yu sells his accessories regularly through his parents shop. Oddly, Himari continues to support him as long as she can keep watching the excitement in his eyes when he works. She has also taken to wearing a necklace he made from an anemone flaccida, representing eternal friendship, and frequently jokes about having to marry him if he has not opened his shop by age thirty. In private, Himari cannot tell if she is attracted to him or not, since the thought of him dating other girls does not upset her. Yu spots a girl wearing a bracelet he sold at the 8th grade festival, but he flees when she grows angry at him for offering to repair the broken chain. Yu's other friend, the serial womanizer Shinji, turns out to be childhood friends with the girl, Rion. Between them they arrange for Yu to repair the bracelet, which Yu had actually sold to Rion's older sister, now a fashion model. Rion is impressed at the level of focus Yu puts into his work and is surprised he and Himari have never dated.
2	"The Hibiscus Hair Ornament"; Transliteration: "Haibisukasu no Kamikazari" (Japanese: ハイビスカスの髪飾り)	Miyuki Ishida	Miyuki Ishida	April 11, 2025
Yu's sister Sakura believes making more friends might be good for Yu's creativity. Yu decides his next piece must embody romantic passion. Himari agrees, since most of his customers are girls, and girls love romance. They also discuss the difference between romance and lust, leading Himari to ask whether they should practise kissing. Yu panics, but Himari admits it was a prank and to say sorry she has arranged a surprise on Saturday. On Saturday it turns out Himari's surprise is inviting Rion to brainstorm ideas for new accessories, and to arrange for Rion to model them in a photoshoot. Yu decides Rion suits warm colours. Himari decides Yu and Rion need her help if they are to become a couple. Rion asks why he likes flowers and he explains as a child he got lost at a botanical gardens and met a girl who was also lost. He ended up buying her a flower so she would stop crying while they looked for her parents, after which he never saw her again. Rion reveals the girl was her, and the flower was a red Hibiscus. Later, it is revealed Himari figured out Yu and Rion met at the botanical garden and are fated to be together, though for some reason this now makes her feel uneasy.
3	"Tulips and the Face of Love"; Transliteration: "Chūrippu to Koi no Hyōjō" (Japanese: チューリップと恋の表情)	Masashi Tsukino	Ei Tanaka	April 18, 2025
Himari keeps her distance and Yu realises she is trying to let him be alone with Rion. Himari mentions asking him to practise kissing, causing Rion to leave awkwardly. Yu attempts to scold her, only for Himari to ask if they should really kiss, since Rion thinks they already have. Yu is tempted and almost does, but it turns out to be another prank, though Himari is disappointed he did not go for it. Shinji is confused why Yu does not just date Rion, then intrigued when Yu describes Himari's sudden change in behaviour. Yu finishes red tulip accessories for Rion to model, but everything feels the same as when Himari models them. Yu decides to attempt a photoshoot with Rion as a Queen of the Night. As tulips represent romantic confessions, Himari asks if Yu can make one for her. Despite realizing he is attracted to her, Yu declines, preferring she wear the necklace representing friendship he made her, not realizing he just rejected her. In private, Himari is deeply upset he gave her a serious rejection and finally realizes she has always been in love with Yu since the first day they met, but since she has kept him as a friend for so long, she believes he does not reciprocate her feelings at all, and will never be her boyfriend. Shinji urges Yu to make Rion his main model for the advertising. Himari becomes upset and causes an argument where Yu admits her recent behaviour, teasing him with kisses and so on, makes her look creepy in his eyes. Having had enough of him rejecting her, Himari angrily humiliates Yu in front of everyone and declares they are splitting up and she never wants to speak to him again, shocking him.
4	"Hydrangea and a New Seed"; Transliteration: "Ajisai to Atarashii Tane" (Japanese: 紫陽花と新しい種)	Daisuke Kurose	Ken'ichi Nishida	April 25, 2025
Yu learns Himari has joined a talent agency in Tokyo. Shocked, he demands to know why she would move away. She refuses to answer and in the struggle Yu accidentally breaks her necklace so Himari accuses him of replacing her with Rion. Shinji advises him to think who is most important to him. It is revealed Himari never intended to move to Tokyo but wanted to make Yu feel guilty enough to apologize. She is confused when Yu ignores her for several days. Himari's brother Hibari blames Himari for being childish and reminds her years ago he helped Yu sell the 200 accessories at the festival by making an embarrassing deal with Rion's sister. He demands she fix the problem between her and Yu and to consider whether she wants Yu because she loves him, or because she does not want Rion to have him. Himari plans to apologize, only for Yu to reveal he plans to quit school and move to Tokyo with her. Realizing she does not want things to change just yet, she claims she quit the agency so they can go back to being friends. Yu agrees and gifts her an anemone flaccida ring to replace her necklace. After Himari leaves, Yu gets a message from someone asking him how things went. Wanting to thank the one who sent him the message, Yu calls her up on the phone. A woman, who is practising Ikebana (later revealed to be his former teacher Araki), answers the call, and it is revealed that Yu placed a seed from a purple tulip inside Himari's ring but was too embarrassed to tell her the meaning behind it. Elsewhere, two female students approach Himari and ask her something about Yu, which surprises her.
5	"A Hunk and Morning Glory Yukata"; Transliteration: "Ikemen to Asagao no Yukata" (Japanese: イケメンと朝顔の浴衣)	Masahito Otani & Tomason	Kōichi Takada	May 2, 2025
Himari wears her new ring on her necklace so no one misunderstands. In response to her teasing, Yu fakes a confession but she sees through it and pretends to be unaffected, though really she was quite flustered. Yu reveals to Himari that while making her ring he became sleep deprived and fell asleep during an exam, which he must retake on a Sunday. Yu is exposed on social media as the creator of the jewellery Himari has been modelling, worrying her that girls might start paying attention to him. Himari confronts Shinji over leaking Yu's identity and he admits he did it to give Rion an edge over her, given that Yu was ready to go to Tokyo for Himari and she hurt him by suddenly changing her mind. Yu spends the night at Himari's home so Hibari can tutor him for the exam. While bathing afterwards Himari offers to wash his back while naked. Assuming she is teasing him Yu agrees, only for Himari to send a naked Hibari instead, though secretly she is disappointed at missing a chance to really seduce him. Hibari discovers Himari never apologised like he told her to and spends all night lecturing her. Rion is angry Yu stayed at Himari's house and insists she will join every future study session to make sure nothing happens.
6	"The Scent of Cherry Sage"; Transliteration: "Cherī Sēji no Kaori" (Japanese: チェリーセージの香り)	Miyuki Ishida	Shinpei Nagai	May 9, 2025
Hibari forbids Rion from the house due to his complicated relationship with her sister Kureha. Himari decides the study session will be at Yu's house. She also reveals she will be busy with student council work so Yu will be alone with Rion for a few hours. Yu keeps being distracted by Rion's figure, so he excuses himself to make drinks. Returning he finds Rion smelling his pillow, claiming it is because he spilled flower tea there earlier. The scent makes her drowsy so she is soon asleep. Yu decides to wake her only to be pulled into her breasts just as Himari and Sakura walk in. After clearing up the misunderstanding Sakura reveals she is actually friends with Kureha and Hibari. Himari is shocked Rion has now confessed four times, and Yu has always rejected her. Yu explains that he no longer feels the same way for Rion since too much time has passed since childhood, and accepting her confession because she is pretty would be shallow. Rion admits it is unreasonable to be jealous, since they have been friends for years while she only recently met them again, but she is determined to become Yu's girlfriend and Himari's best friend, even though Yu continues to reject her. Hibari believes Himari is being foolish as all her recent actions have only made Yu's life more difficult, so she has no right to call herself his friend or aspire to be his girlfriend either. Yu manages to retake his exam with a perfect score.
7	"The Cracked Crocus"; Transliteration: "Hibiwareta Kurokkasu" (Japanese: ひび割れたクロッカス)	Makoto Sokuza	Shinpei Nagai	May 16, 2025
Yu is waylaid by Himari's friends Mao and Azu, whom Yu had promised some jewellery to. Yu is intrigued when Mao requests matching pieces for her anniversary with her boyfriend, since Yu has never made men's jewellery before. Yu chooses the Japanese Cornel, a symbol of maturity and longevity to represent a long relationship. Yu feels uncomfortable at the prices he has to charge for custom pieces as it is expensive for high school students. Unfortunately, a rumor spreads that the custom jewelry he makes can make your crush fall in love with you. Yu is soon so busy, he has to rent workspace at Himari's house. Letting him fall asleep in her lap, Himari thinks about how he has become more passionate in his work since his identity went public, making her love him even more. Shinji apologizes in advance for something he did that might cause Yu a lot of trouble. One of Yu's customers, who failed to attract a senpai she liked with the custom jewellery, tells the school Yu is coercing girls into buying expensive jewellery, forcing the school to stop him selling anything else while they investigate. Himari is furious, especially when the girl destroys the jewellery Yu made for her. Yu is distraught by the turn of events as Rion tries to console him.
8	"Zinnia and Where Passion Lies"; Transliteration: "Jinia to Jōnetsu no Ari ka" (Japanese: ジニアと情熱のありか)	Masashi Tsukino	Kōichi Takada	May 23, 2025
To appease the parents, the school registers a complaint against Yu's family store. As he technically caused the situation Shinji apologises again. Himari worries when Yu considers quitting making jewellery. She admits she would miss the passion in his eyes, which he interprets as being worthless unless he is working. Hibari notes Himari obviously upset Yu when he was already emotional. He also tells her Yu was unprepared to deal with the public after his identity was exposed, which is why this first negative experience affected him so badly. If he recovers it will be Himari's job to help him cope better next time. Himari reminds Yu opening his shop was her dream as well, so until he starts making jewellery again they are no longer friends. Rion points out Yu is obviously unhappy without his jewellery. Yu admits he did not feel upset when the girl destroyed her jewellery because he realised he enjoys making jewellery because it makes Himari happy, so he quit because it felt like he was being dishonest towards customers. Rion advises whether his jewellery helped or inconvenienced customers was not his responsibility. Realising he needs Himari in his life he goes to apologise. Himari admits she was never moving to Tokyo and they are soon back to normal. Meanwhile at the airport, Shinji picks up Kureha, who informs him that she is here to punish a junior for tarnishing her name. Shinji expresses interest in assisting her.
9	"Love's Chocolate Cosmos"; Transliteration: "Koi no Chokorēto Kosumosu" (Japanese: 恋のチョコレートコスモス)	Ei Tanaka	Ei Tanaka	May 30, 2025
In the past, Yu made a competition piece based on Himari's name meaning "sunflower", but Himari claimed it felt unfinished. In the present, Himari notices Yu does not want to be anywhere near her at all, and even reluctantly agrees to spend time with Rion in order to avoid her at all costs. The rivalry between Himari and Rion becomes more heated and intense, as they begin to hate each other, leaving Yu wishing he could just avoid them both. Much to his shock, Himari invites Yu to a sleepover, and then to go bikini shopping, but he cannot handle her teasing so he flees all the way home. There he finds Kureha who reveals Himari really had signed on to her modelling agency in Tokyo but quit at the last minute despite the money she spent on her. Meanwhile, Himari learns from Shinji that Yu recently planted the Chocolate Cosmos, representing an end of romantic love, leading her to believe he hates her. Kureha offers Yu money to open his shop if he convinces Himari to join her agency. When Yu refuses, she accuses him of holding Himari back because he does not want to be alone. She then offers to move him and Himari to Tokyo as a couple, but only if he stops making jewelry, but Yu cannot bring himself to accept the offer. Hibari arrives to rescue Yu from Kureha's manipulation, revealing he knows her methods as they used to date. Kureha easily deals with Hibari with an embarrassing video of him from their dating days. Sakura intervenes to calm things down, so Kureha offers a final deal; Yu must create his best piece ever for the Obon Festival competition, and if he proves his work has value she will leave Himari alone, but if he fails, she will force Himari to repay the money she owes, leaving her no choice except to work for her.
10	"The Meaning Behind Sunflowers"; Transliteration: "Himawari no Hanakotoba" (Japanese: ヒマワリの花言葉)	Shūji Miyazaki	Iku Suzuki	June 6, 2025
Himari hints one day she would like to be Yu's wife, then reveals it was another joke for avoiding her recently. Hibari confronts Shinji for working with Kureha. Yu starts brainstorming ideas for the competition and takes Himari and Rion to his flower arranging school for inspiration. Himari is reminded of an accident that caused her to start cutting her hair short and wonders if Yu would like it if she grew it out like Rion's. Yu decides to impress Kureha with an improved version of the sunflower piece he made in the past. Himari is thrilled since he originally made that piece for her back in middle school, but is disappointed that it was Rion's idea. To gather materials, Yu and Himari visit a sunflower festival without Rion who has to work. Himari asks Yu if Rion is why he has been avoiding her, but Yu feels too embarrassed to admit it is because he realised he has a crush on her. Himari starts to wonder if men and women can really be friends without love getting involved. Seeing Yu completely focused on the sunflowers, Himari whispers she loves him and wishes he would look at her like he looks at flowers. Unfortunately, Yu not only hears what she said, but instead assumes she was setting him up for another joke, making her run away. Realising all her jokes made Yu unable to take her seriously even when she tells the truth, she becomes angry at herself. When he finds her, Yu is shocked when she suddenly returns her ring necklace, claiming she does not want just a friendship anymore before kissing him.
11	"Goodbye, Sunflower"; Transliteration: "Sayonara Himawari" (Japanese: さよならヒマワリ)	Masahito Otani & Tomason	Shinpei Nagai	June 13, 2025
Yu has no idea how to act around Himari. Shinji admits he only helped Kureha because he has a crush on her, which she did not reciprocate. Himari is surprised Hibari is proud of her for finally acting on her feelings. Yu tells Himari he has something important to tell her, but not until he has defeated Kureha. He also reveals he has chosen to make a sunflower tiara. Yu completes the tiara in time but three days before the competition discovers he messed up the preservation process and the sunflowers are rotting. With Hibari's help he is able to finish a second tiara. Unfortunately, Kureha deduces he finished in a hurry to look good for the competition, but the quality is far below what she expected. Yu is angry at the accusation he is not taking his work seriously, but Sakura shows him some of his recent pieces all have the same preservation issue, proving the quality of his work has gotten worse. Depressed, Yu gives up and Shinji advises Himari to go with Kureha and build her modelling career, then when she is famous she can promote Yu's jewellery across the country. Himari blames herself for Yu's loss of focus and decides to go to Tokyo, hoping one day they can have Yu's store and an epic romance, but in the meantime they will have to separate.
12	"Flowers That Bloom Along the Path of Dreams"; Transliteration: "Yume no Michi ni Saku Hana-tachi" (Japanese: 夢の道に咲く花たち)	Miyuki Ishida	Yōhei Suzuki	June 20, 2025
Rion asks Shinji to help, pointing out if he actually prevents Himari leaving it might impress Kureha. Shinji asks Hibari for a favour. Yu questions whether he wants to open a store without Himari. Shinji points out he could easily go to Tokyo with Himari and get a normal job. He then accuses him of only using Himari to promote his accessories, since the moment it became romantic Yu could not handle it and pushed Himari away. Yu shouts that he loves Himari and rushes to the train station. Rion meets Himari and similarly provokes her into admitting she wants to stay with Yu. Yu appears, revealing he chooses love over his store. Kureha reminds them about Himari's debt but Shinji arrives with cash and pays the debt in full, revealing he borrowed money from Hibari. Annoyed at being defeated Kureha forgives the debt, rejects the money and leaves with Hibari to punish him for spoiling her fun. As they now owe him for saving them Shinji demands they keep entertaining him with their bizarre relationship. Yu admits he is partially abandoning his dream of the store, since having only one dream limited his possibilities, so first he wants to start with loving Himari and see where the future takes them together. He then reveals the secret meaning of the purple tulip seed he hid inside her friend ring; Eternal Love. Himari begins wearing it as a necklace again and they return to normal, only this time as a couple.

== Reception ==
By November 2025, the series had over 550,000 copies in circulation.

== See also ==
- Chanto Suki tte Ieru Ko Musō, another light novel series by the same author
