= Kanako Ogata =

Japanese singer and television personality

- 緒方 かな子
- Born: 4 March 1973 (age 52)
- Other names: Kanako Nakajō
- Occupations: Singer; television personality; painter
- Years active: 1980s–1996
- Spouse: Koichi Ogata (m. 1996)
- Children: 3 (including Yuna Ogata)

Kanako Ogata (Japanese: 緒方 かな子, Hepburn: Ogata Kanako, born 4 March 1973), previously known as Kanako Nakajō (Japanese: 中條 かな子, Hepburn: Nakajō Kanako), is a Japanese singer and television personality from Naka-ku, Hiroshima. Originally part of the Sakurakko Club, she released a few solo singles and had a career as an actress, gravure idol, and radio personality, before retiring after her marriage to baseball player Koichi Ogata. Afterwards, she became a painter whose work was exhibited nationwide, and she returned as a local talent in her native Hiroshima, being a part of NHK Hiroshima radio's Kin'yō Yūgata; Dōkai no and Hiroshima Television's Terebiha.

== Biography ==
Kanako Ogata, a native of Naka-ku, Hiroshima, was born on 4 March 1973. She was educated at Horikoshi High School.

Her career began when she was seven. She was a member of the Sakurakko Club Sakura-gumi. Debuting under the name Kanako Nakajō, she sang the ending theme song of Sakurakko Club, "Tenshi no Tobira", and Pony Canyon released it as her debut single on 21 June 1991. She sang the ending theme song of the TV Asahi drama Kyosen no Tsukenai Eigo (1992–1993), "Kotoba o Sagashite", and Pony Canyon released it as a single on 18 June 1993.

Outside of music, she also worked as an actress, gravure idol, radio personality. She was also known as Queen of the School Festival (学園祭の女王, Gakuensai no Joō). In 1993 or 1994, she took a minor career break when she contracted meningitis.

In 1996, she married Koichi Ogata, at the time an outfielder for the Hiroshima Toyo Carp; they had two daughters and a son, including singer and voice actress Yuna Ogata. She subsequently took a career hiatus, during which she took up Nihonga painting and oil painting. By 2013, she had produced at least a hundred paintings. In 1998, she made her first appearance at the Nika Art Exhibition. Her self-portrait, "Yoka no Tanoshimi" (余暇の楽しみ), was selected for the 88th Hakujitsu Exhibition in 2012. In December 2013, her first solo exhibition took place at Gallery Miyasaka in Ginza. Another oil painting, "Natsuyasumi" (夏休み), was selected for the 93rd Hakujitsu Exhibition in 2017.

Following her career hiatus, she later became a local talent in her native Hiroshima. By 2013, she was part of the NHK Hiroshima radio programme Kin'yō Yūgata; Dōkai no. In April 2017, she become a Tuesday commentator on Hiroshima Television's news programme Terebiha. She appeared as Yumi in the eighth episode of the TBS drama 99.9 Criminal Lawyer, broadcast on 11 March 2018; this was her first appearance on a television drama since 1995.

In December 2013, Ogata confirmed in an interview with Zakzak that she had developed arrhythmia and therefore underwent cardiac catheterization. In 2016, she got a pet French bulldog whom she named Yūshō (優勝).

== Discography ==
=== Singles ===
Title	Details	Peak chart positions		Ref.
Title	Details	JPN	JPN Hot	Ref.
"Tenshi no Tobira"	Released: 21 June 1991; Label: Pony Canyon	—	—	
"Kizuna"	Released: 21 January 1992; Label: Pony Canyon	—	—	
"Weekday Alice"	Released: 17 July 1992; Label: Pony Canyon	—	—	
"Kotoba o Sagashite"	Released: 18 June 1993; Label: Pony Canyon	—	—	
"—" denotes releases that did not chart or were not released in that region.

== Filmography ==
=== Television dramas ===
- Hanafubukion'na Three Sanshimai (1995)
- 99.9 Criminal Lawyer (2018), Yumi
