= Kaiju Girl Caramelise =

Japanese manga series

- Cover of the Kaiju Girl Caramelise first volume (English edition), featuring Kuroe Akaishi

乙女怪獣キャラメリゼ (Otome Kaijū Kyaramerize)
- Genre: Romantic comedy, science fiction
- Manga
- Written by: Spica Aoki
- Published by: Media Factory
- English publisher: NA: Yen Press
- Imprint: MF Comics Alive Series
- Magazine: Monthly Comic Alive
- Original run: February 27, 2018 – present
- Volumes: 10
- Anime television series
- Directed by: Teruyuki Omine
- Produced by: Yuka Ebihara; Shinji Horikiri; Keishirou Obata; Youjin Fukushima; Nanami Kamata; Tomoyuki Oowada; Shinichi Itou; Hinako Watanabe; Gorou Ishida (Note: Amazon version.)
- Written by: Yuniko Ayana
- Music by: Yuuki Furuhashi; Shinnosuke Nakasone
- Studio: Liden Films
- Licensed by: Crunchyroll; SEA: Muse Communication
- Original network: TBS, BS11, AT-X
- Original run: July 3, 2026 – September 18, 2026
- Episodes: 12
- icon

Kaiju Girl Caramelise (Japanese: 乙女怪獣キャラメリゼ, Hepburn: Otome Kaijū Kyaramerize; lit. Maiden Kaiju Carameliser) is a Japanese seinen manga (Note: The demographic of a manga series is generally determined by the demographic of its magazine of publication. This particular series is noteworthy for being called a "shōjo" by the manga author and editors.) series written and illustrated by Spica Aoki. It was serialized in the monthly manga magazine Monthly Comic Alive in February 2018, with Media Factory publishing the chapters in June of that same year. The series was later licensed by Yen Press for an English-language translation in North America. An anime television series adaptation produced by Liden Films aired from July to September 2026.

The plot centers around a student named Kuroe Akaishi who suffers from a mysterious illness, and how it may impact her newfound love interest.

== Plot ==
Kuroe Akaishi is described as "Psycho-tan" by her classmates and is an outcast at school. She suffers from a rare, incurable illness that causes deformations in her body when she feels very strong emotions, particularly romantic feelings. She is surprised one day to find that Arata Minami, a popular guy in her class, starts to pay attention to her and questions the weird new feelings she has around him. It isn't long before her mother confesses to Kuroe that she is in fact a kaiju, which confirmed a realistic "dream" the prior night that involved her monster form rampaging through Tokyo. Kuroe struggles and is dismissive of the information, and worries that Arata will not accept her for what she is (both human and monster form).

== Characters ==
Kuroe Akaishi (赤石 黒絵) / Harugon (ハルゴン)
Voiced by: Hikari Senga (Japanese); Nia Celeste (English)
The protagonist of the story, Kuroe has been suffering from a mysterious illness for at least sixteen years that causes abnormal body growth and disfigurement. This has led Kuroe to become an outcast feeling that nobody could accept someone like her. While Kuroe does not remember her past she tries her best to live a normal life in the present. She is surprised when Arata decides to date her and tries to hide her transformations from him whenever she can. Kuroe also has a pet dog named "Jumbo King".
Arata Minami (南 新汰)
Voiced by: Daishi Kajita (Japanese); Jacob Hopkins (English)
Arata is a popular guy in Kuroe's school who starts getting model offerings. He takes interest in Kuroe, revealing that he too wants to be out of the spotlight, and lost a lot of weight to become the person he is known as. This quickly irritates the other jealous school girls crushing on him who cannot understand what he sees in Kuroe. Arata does not know that she is secretly a Kaiju which causes misunderstandings to happen.
Rinko Akaishi (赤石 凜子)
Voiced by: Kotono Mitsuishi (Japanese); Luci Christian (English)
Kuroe's devoted mother, Rinko is shown to be there for her daughter against judgmental people knowing full well that she is a Kaiju. Rinko is also a former biologist who discovered the remains of a Kaiju and brought one of its eggs home with her. She then proceeded to raise the shape shifting baby Kaiju whom she named Kuroe as a human. Rinko is a big fan of the singer Mayumi Hamasaki, who is based on Ayumi Hamasaki.
Koutarou Hibino (ひびの幸太郎)
Voiced by: Katsuyuki Konishi (Japanese); Robert McCollum (English)
Koutarou is Rinko's former colleague when they were traveling biologists. He was with Rinko when they found a Kaiju skeleton and watched as Rinko decided to take home an egg vowing him to secrecy. While he does not approve of how Rinko raised Kuroe he acts like a protective uncle to her which causes Arata at one point to mistake him for a boyfriend. Koutarou has since started working for the Japanese government which has alarmed Rinko who just wants Kuroe and her newly hatched sibling to be happy.
Manatsu Tomosato (友里真夏)
Voiced by: Akira Sekine (Japanese); Megan Shipman (English)
Manatsu is depicted as a wealthy girl who has a romantic obsession for the Kaiju. She attends the same school as Kuroe where the two become best friends, while not knowing that her object of desire is in fact Kuroe. Manatsu has a habit of dressing up as a butterfly (inspired by Mothra) in order to get the Kaiju to "stomp her flat" whenever it shows up.
Raimu "Rairi" Kouno (河野ライム)
Voiced by: Haruka Shiraishi (Japanese); Giovannie Cruz (English)
The most "popular" girl in Kuroe's school, Rairi is shown to be heavily into makeup. She becomes friends with Kuroe and the two form a trusting bond when she helps her gain confidence in herself. Kuroe later learns that Rairi's face resembles a gorilla's (inspired by King Kong) without her makeup on, a fact she is deeply sensitive about and bonds with Kuroe's own body image issues over.

== Media ==
=== Manga ===
Written by Spica Aoki, Kaiju Girl Caramelise was serialized in the monthly seinen magazine Monthly Comic Alive since February 27, 2018. The author had previous works serialized in magazines aimed towards girls (shōjo), so she was worried when a male-targeted (seinen) magazine picked up her series, thinking that she has to create the series aimed more towards guys, until her editors advised that "this story really works best as shōjo" even though it was in a seinen magazine.

The series was published by Media Factory with its first volume on June 23, 2018, with ten volumes released as of July 22, 2026. It was also released in ebook format on Kadokawa's Comic Walker website.

On November 18, 2018, North American publisher Yen Press announced at Anime NYC that they had licensed the series, with the first English language volume released on June 25, 2019.

==== Volumes ====
No.	Original release date	Original ISBN	English release date	English ISBN
1	June 23, 2018	978-4-0406-9914-1	June 25, 2019	978-1-9753-5705-4
2	January 23, 2019	978-4-0406-5249-8	November 19, 2019	978-1-9753-5946-1
3	August 23, 2019	978-4-0406-5802-5	April 21, 2020	978-1-9753-0860-5
4	March 23, 2020	978-4-0406-4379-3	March 23, 2021	978-1-9753-2275-5
5	March 23, 2021	978-4-0406-5959-6	January 25, 2022	978-1-9753-3557-1
6	January 21, 2022	978-4-0468-1026-7	September 20, 2022	978-1-9753-5112-0
7	March 23, 2023	978-4-0468-2245-1	February 20, 2024	978-1-9753-8037-3
8	September 21, 2024	978-4-0468-4100-1	October 28, 2025	979-8-8554-1833-0
9	December 23, 2025	978-4-0468-5213-7	February 23, 2027	979-8-8554-4826-9
10	July 22, 2026	978-4-0466-0304-3	—	—

=== Anime ===
An anime television series adaptation was announced on December 22, 2025. It is produced by Liden Films and directed by Teruyuki Omine, with Yuniko Ayana handling series composition, and Mitomi Nakayama designing the characters. The series aired from July 3 to September 18, 2026, on TBS and other networks. (Note: TBS listed the series premiere on July 2 at 25:28, which is effectively July 3 at 1:28 a.m. JST.) The opening theme song is "Otome Kaijū" (乙女怪獣; Kaiju Girl), performed by Metanick, while the ending theme song is "Otome no Honki" (オトメノホンキ; A Girl's Earnestness), performed by HoneyWorks feat. HaKoniwalily. Crunchyroll streamed the series in North America, Central America, South America, Europe, Africa, Oceania, the Middle East, CIS, and India. Muse Communication licensed the series in Southeast Asia.

==== Episodes ====
No.	Title	Directed by (Note: Production staff information is taken from the ending credits of each episode.)	Storyboarded by	Original release date
1	"The Kaiju Girl Appears in Tokyo" "Otome Kaijū Tōkyō ni Arawaru" (Japanese: 乙女怪獣東京に現る)	Teruyuki Omine	Teruyuki Omine	July 3, 2026
Kuroe Akaishi is a high school student who suffers from a rare, incurable condition that causes parts of her body to mutate whenever she feels intense emotion. As a result, she has become a social pariah in her school and tries to avoid any human interaction. However, she attracts the notice of Arata Minami, the most popular boy in her class. While skeptical of Arata's motives, she agrees to go with him to a high end cafe to eat pancakes, where she learns Arata used to be overweight and was self conscious about his appearance. Feeling that they are kindred spirits, Kuroe decides to accompany Arata for the rest of the day and begins developing genuine feelings for him, especially after he ignores a pair of classmates attempting to bully her. However, feeling her body going out of control, Kuroe flees and falls into a river, transforming into a full sized kaiju. The JSDF attacks her and she prepares to retaliate until she sees Arata and the populace of Tokyo looking at her in fear. Distressed, Kuroe dives into the river and transforms back into her human form before fainting. She wakes up the next morning and finds out to her dismay that her transformation wasn't a dream and Tokyo has nicknamed her kaiju form "Harugon". Her mother theorizes her transformations have become more intense due to her experiencing puberty.
2	"The Unopened Door" "Akanai Tobira" (Japanese: 開かない扉)	Moe Ōnishi	Kazuhiro Furuhashi	July 10, 2026 (Note: Due to the broadcast of the 2026 FIVB Women's Volleyball Nations League, this episode aired at 2:13 a.m. JST, 45 minutes after the regular air time on TBS.)
Kuroe wonders if it is safe to stay by Arata's side, and becomes depressed when she sees him speaking with another student, Manatsu Tomosato. Believing Manatsu is Arata's girlfriend, Kuroe avoids the both of them. That night, Kuroe investigates a caterpillar-like kaiju near the river, only to find out it is Manatsu in a costume. Manatsu explains that she is a kaiju fan, and wants to see Harugon in person. She also only spoke with Arata because he was one of the few students who witnessed Harugon up close, and is not in any relationship with him. Manatsu also wants to speak to Kuroe. Not knowing she is Harugon but that she was in the area at the same time, Manatsu believes Kuroe is the "Priestess of Harugon" who has a connection with the kaiju. The next day, as a favor to Kuroe, Manatsu openly asks Arata if he has a girlfriend. He replies that he does not but implies he likes Kuroe. Kuroe's jealous classmates later lock her in the gym storeroom. Arata finds out what happened to Kuroe and heads to the storehouse to rescue her. He admits that he had feelings for her the first time they met and wishes to continue their relationship, and Kuroe wishes to reciprocate his feelings. As Arata leaves to retrieve Kuroe's bag, she loses control of her emotions and transforms into Harugon again in the middle of the school, and she laments that a normal romance with Arata is impossible for her.
3	"A Sparkling Weekend ~Where Dreams Come True~" "Kirameku Shūmatsu ~Yume no Kuni e~" (Japanese: キラメク週末～夢の国へ～)	Kenji Takahashi	Kenji Takahashi	July 17, 2026 (Note: Due to the broadcast of the 2026 FIVB Women's Volleyball Nations League, this episode aired at 2:23 a.m. JST, 55 minutes after the regular air time on TBS.)
Once again, Kuroe flees into the river and manages to transform back into her human form. She returns to the school and reunites with Arata, who invites her on a date to the Tokyo Destinyland theme park. Kuroe accepts, but is left worried that her nature as a kaiju will be exposed. After receiving a makeover from Manatsu, Kuroe meets Arata at the park while her mother Rinko spies on them while disguised as the park mascot. Kuroe and Arata spend the whole day at the park, but Kuroe deliberately tries not to get too intimate with him for fear of triggering her kaiju transformation. Arata notices Kuroe's efforts to maintain her distance and misinterprets it as her intention to break up with him. Kuroe tries to reassure him she still has feelings for him, but in her emotional turmoil she partially transforms in front of him and flees in terror. Coming to the conclusion that there is no point trying to pretend to be a human girl, Kuroe resolves to fully transform into a kaiju and destroy the park when she is once again stopped by Arata, who has mistaken her transformation as an elaborate cosplay of his favorite park character, Jonny. No longer having to worry about her appearance while in the park, Kuroe opens up to Arata and assures him that she reciprocates his feelings, and they spend the rest of the evening enjoying the park together. Meanwhile, as Rinko returns home, she encounters an old acquaintance.
4	"The Scary Kaiju Fest" "Kyōfu no Kaijū Fesu" (Japanese: 恐怖の怪獣フェス)	Koji Aritomi	Hideyo Yamamoto	July 24, 2026
Rinko is met by her old friend, biologist Koutarou Hibino whom she used to explore the world with looking for rare creatures. She is suspicious of him when he starts asking questions about Harugon, and reluctantly allows him to take Kuroe to a metal rock concert she dreamed of attending. However, she cautions Kuroe not to tell Koutarou about her kaiju transformation. At the concert, they happen to encounter Arata who is working there part-time. Deducing they have feelings for each other, Koutarou immediately becomes protective of Kuroe and warns her not to trust boys like Arata, while Arata becomes jealous of how close Kuroe and Koutarou appear to be. He tries to apologize to Kuroe for appearing too pushy, and Kuroe's guilt at how she cannot tell him about her true nature causes her to transform into Harugon. As the concert guests attempt to flee, Arata decides to use himself as bait to lure Harugon away with Manatsu's help, deducing that Harugon has some connection to him. During the chase, Harugon knocks Manatsu's helicopter out of the sky. While Manatsu parachutes to safety, Arata is caught by Harugon, and he remarks that Harugon's eyes remind him Kuroe's. Kuroe realizes Arata really is capable of loving a kaiju and transforms back into human form after he faints. Before she can admit her true nature to him, Arata takes the initiative, being inspired by Harugon's attempts to communicate with him, and asks Kuroe out on another date, which she accepts. Meanwhile, Koutarou spies on their conversation and begins to suspect Kuroe is Harugon.
5	"A Gyaru and Lipstick" "Gyaru to Kuchibeni" (Japanese: ギャルと口紅)	migmi	migmi	July 31, 2026
Ever since the metal concert, Kuroe's feelings for Arata cause her to transform into Harugon more often. As they return to school for the new term, Kuroe asks Arata to pretend they're just friends so as not to draw unwanted attention to either of them, to which he agrees. However, Kuroe encounters Arata's younger sister, who remarks that Arata never stops thinking about her. Realizing her mistake, Kuroe decides not to hide the fact she is dating Arata, shocking the whole school. Kuroe and Arata end up being assigned to different classes, and while she is initially afraid of being bullied, Kuroe catches the attention of one of her new classmates, Raimu "Rairi" Kouno, who gives her an impromptu makeover. Seeing that Arata likes seeing her wearing makeup, Kuroe asks Raira to help her buy more. She takes Kuroe to the makeup store, but a construction accident causes Rairi to get hit in the face with water which washes her makeup off. Kuroe is shocked to see Rairi's real face resembles a gorilla, and she admits that she hated how she looked which is why she learned how to use makeup to cover it up, and she dreams of creating a makeup brand for girls like her who want to change their appearance. Inspired by Rairi's resolve, Kuroe starts to dabble in makeup and looks forward to an upcoming field trip with Arata.
6	"Rairi's Forest" "Rairi no Mori" (Japanese: らいりの森)	Kōsuke Madokawa	Kōsuke Madokawa	August 7, 2026
Kuroe, Manatsu, and Rairi attend the school field trip to Ogouchi Reservoir. As they are setting up their camp, they talk about their romantic interests, Rairi is happy that Kuroe has a healthy relationship with Arata, but remarks she isn't ready for a relationship since she is still heartbroken after a boy she had feelings for, Okada, made fun of her gorilla-like appearance. However, as they tour the campsite, Rairi has chance encounter with Okada, who does not recognize her. When he compliments Rairi's appearance, her feelings for him are rekindled. Kuroe reluctantly leaves Rairi with Okada so she can go meet Arata, but remains troubled. She and Arata nearly kiss in the moment, but they both break off at the last second in embarrassment. However, Kuroe overhears from other students that Okada is an infamous womanizer and she tries to warn Rairi. Meanwhile, Okada attempts to woo Rairi on a rowboat, but when she discovers that he hasn't changed and still makes fun of her old appearance, she tries to leave but accidentally falls overboard. Kuroe transforms into Harugon in an attempt to distract everybody, but accidentally causes a flash flood that strands a student. Rather than reapply her makeup, Rairi rescues the trapped the student and exposes her real face to everybody. Despite this, all of her friends donate their makeup to her as thanks for helping them all look pretty. When Okada tries to make fun of Rairi, Kuroe picks him and tosses him into the lake. Inspired by Rairi's example, Kuroe "kisses" Arata as Harugon and resolves to be less self conscious about her kaiju side. After the field trip ends, a video of Harugon kissing Arata goes viral as he is dubbed the "Prince of Kaiju".
7	"All Eyes on Arata" "Nerawareta Arata" (Japanese: 狙われた新汰)	Kenji Kuroda	Kenji Kuroda	August 14, 2026
Arata becomes an unwilling celebrity overnight, making Kuroe feel guilty for accidentally putting him in the spotlight. Due to all of the public attention, Arata suggests to Kuroe they not appear in public together to prevent rumors about them being spread around. They first try to communicate via video call, but Arata isn't satisfied and instead suggests they both attend a fireworks festival where he can hide in the crowd. While Rinko at first warns Kuroe against going out with Arata, after witnessing how happy Kuroe is around him, she eventually decides to support Kuroe. At the festival, Arata assures Kuroe that he has found a private spot they can watch the fireworks together, but are disappointed to find it is already occupied by delinquents. Kuroe assures Arata that it does not matter if they miss the fireworks as long as they are together. When the show actually starts, Kuroe and Arata end up getting separated, and the stress causes Kuroe to transform into Harugon. As the crowd flees, Arata pleads to Harugon not ruin the show for everybody else, which causes Kuroe to calm down. After the show, Kuroe meets back up with Arata, who celebrates the festival with her with sparklers while Manatsu watches on jealously. When Arata returns home, he finds Manatsu waiting for him dressed as Harugon.
8	"Fly to Manatsu's Kaiju Island!!" "Manatsu no Kaijū Shima e Tobe!!" (Japanese: マ夏の怪獣島へ飛べ！！)	Norikazu Ishigooka	Norikazu Ishigooka	August 21, 2026
Manatsu expresses her jealousy at how Harugon seems to show so much affection to Arata while showing none for her, and cautions him not to cheat on Kuroe with Harugon, though Arata insists he only loves Kuroe. Manatsu then invites Kuroe and Rairi to an uninhabited island where she tries to use Kuroe's presence to summon Harugon, with little success. Determined to express her feelings to Harugon, Manatsu heads deeper into the island with Kuroe reluctantly accompanying her. However, they are attacked by a komodo dragon and end up getting separated. Searching for Manatsu, Kuroe comes across a cave containing a recently hatched egg along with an ancient cave painting of a kaiju identical to Harugon. She eventually finds Manatsu but they are attacked by more komodo dragons. Kuroe transforms into Harugon and saves Manatsu, who still doesn't realize Harugon's true identity, and expresses her love for Harugon, assuring him that even if the world rejects her she is glad she exists in the world. Unknown to either of them, kaiju like creatures are seen living on the island. Back on the mainland, Rinko hears news of Harugon appearing on an abandoned island, and recalling how she originally found a kaiju egg on a similar island, decides to leave on a trip. Meanwhile, Arata is convinced by TV producer Touko Takamine to appear on her show, much to Kuroe's shock.
9	"Release the Torrent of Complaints, Kaiju Girl!" "Otome Kaijū Guchi o Hake!" (Japanese: 乙女怪獣愚痴を吐け！)	Moe Ōnishi	Kazuki Horiguchi	August 28, 2026
Arata is unhappy he was tricked into appearing on a talk show instead of a news program like he was promised. He also encounters the actress Seina Katsuragi, who is unhappy Takamine bumped her off the show at the last minute in favor of Arata. Arata apologizes to Seina for accidentally preventing her from achieving her dream, and Seina accepts, musing she might have a crush on him. Kuroe invites Arata to her apartment so he can lay low, and he confides in her he only agreed to appear on TV so he can try to convince everybody Harugon is not a threat, and also mentions his run in with Seina. Frustrated Arata's fame seems to be putting distance between them, Kuroe tries to privately vent her frustrations but accidentally shoots a laser from her mouth into the river. The next day, Kuroe is further frustrated she cannot spend time with Arata at school, and on the way home she encounters a young man who saw her shoot her laser breath and wishes to date her, causing her to run away in fear. Meanwhile, Rinko arrives at the kaiju island and encounters Koutarou, who has deduced Kuroe was born from a kaiju egg Rinko took from the island. Rinko then reveals there is a second kaiju egg that she had been secretly cultivating on the island which is even larger than Kuroe's. Fearing the possibility of a second kaiju, Koutarou attempts to report it to the government but gets in a struggle with Rinko that ends up causing the egg to hatch. A flying kaiju then emerges and takes off, heading straight for Kuroe.
10	"Don't Cry, Heartbroken Kaiju" "Nakuna Shitsuren Kaijū" (Japanese: 泣くな失恋怪獣)	Shinobu Yoshioka & Kenji Kuroda	Shinobu Yoshioka	September 4, 2026
Kuroe encounters the young man from earlier, Daichi Yoneyama. However, Kuroe learns that Daichi is actually a 5th grader, but a growth spurt makes him look much older than he actually is. He admits that due to his size difference, he is bullied by his classmates so Kuroe agrees to become his friend. With Arata busy with an interview, Kuroe decides to play video games with Daichi at his apartment, where she feels relaxed not having to hide her kaiju features from him. Daichi also confides that he wants to make friends so his deceased mother would not have to worry about him, and Kuroe assures him he has a kind heart. Arata then witnesses Kuroe hanging out with Daichi and mistakenly believes she is cheating on him and rejects her. The stress of the misunderstanding and the increasing distance between them causes Kuroe to blurt out she wants to break up, pushing Arata further away. The next day, Manatsu and Rairi insist that Kuroe just needs an opportunity to properly explain things to Arata, but then witness him and Seina having an intimate moment while they are filming a kaiju movie. Believing Arata is now dating Seina, Kuroe flees and disowns Arata, wishing she never fell in love and blaming him for her heartbreak. Before she can transform, the second kaiju then appears overhead.
11	"Kuroe vs. Akae" "Kuroe VS Akae" (Japanese: クロエVSアカエ)	Moe Ōnishi & Yasuhito Nishikata	Masao Suzuki	September 11, 2026
It is revealed that the intimate hug Arata and Seina shared was part of their rehearsal. In reality, Arata wanted to make amends with Kuroe and Seina advised him not to trust Takamine and quit showbusiness. The flying kaiju then arrives and begins terrorizing the city as it searches for Kuroe. Realizing Kuroe is in danger, Arata abandons the set and starts searching the city for her and recalls the reason why he fell in love with her in the first place. Kuroe manages to escape the city on her own, but upon learning that Arata is looking for her, she also recalls why she fell in love with him as well. They both reunite, but Kuroe is blown away into the river by the flying kaiju and transforms into Harugon, with Arata realizing the truth. Harugon battles the flying kaiju and seemingly defeats it. Arata waits for Harugon to return and learns the truth about Daichi, realizing his misunderstanding. However, as Harugon returns to the city, she is ambushed by the flying kaiju as it shoots an energy beam at her.
12	"Charge This One Strike With Love" "Kono Ichigeki ni Ai o Komete" (Japanese: この一撃に愛をこめて)	Teruyuki Omine, Misato Takada & Yoshifumi Sueda	Teruyuki Omine & Masao Suzuki	September 18, 2026
Harugon collapses in the water, with everybody fearing she is dead. Arata keeps Daichi from falling off a bridge, and they both acknowledge each other as rivals for Kuroe's love. Manatsu arrives with her helicopter and rescues Daichi, but Arata dives into the water, sensing Harugon is still alive. As he climbs Harugon's body, Kuroe has a nightmare of Arata rejecting her due to her kaiju side. However, she senses Arata's presence which pulls her out of the nightmare. The flying kaiju also senses Harugon is still alive and returns to finish her off, but Harugon revives and regenerates. Held in Harugon's hands, Arata loudly proclaims his love for Kuroe. Realizing that Arata still loves her despite knowing she is Harugon, Kuroe fires an energy beam that badly wounds the flying kaiju and causes it to flee in fear. With the city saved, everybody cheers on Harugon as a hero. Meanwhile, Rinko and Koutarou return to the mainland. Kuroe manages to partially transform back into her human form, and she and Arata both reaffirm their love for each other and kiss. They then flee the scene as helicopters arrive.

== Reception ==
=== Manga ===
The English-language adaptation of Kaiju Girl Caramelise has received positive ratings: Rebecca Silverman from Anime News Network gave the first volume an overall "B+" rating, saying that the story works on "both metaphoric and literal levels". While Silverman also praised the "fun" art, she was critical of a few confusing pages and two of the characters. She called the volume overall an "enjoyable blend of adolescent metaphor". Sean Gaffney from "A Case Suitable for Treatment" called the first volume a "lot of fun", saying that the main character is intelligent and likeable. Gaffney goes on to say that he hoped the series would not go towards a "yuri" direction based on one of the character's actions, and that the series as a whole was fairly lighthearted, and "sweet in its own way". Brigid Alverson included the manga in a "Best of June 2019" grouping saying that the story is about a teen romance that "runs far, far off the rails". The first and second volume of Kaiju Girl Caramelise were also listed in the American Library Association's 2020 and 2021 lists of "Great Graphic Novels for Teens".

=== Anime ===
The Encyclopedia of Science Fiction described Kaiju Girl Caramelise as an enjoyable and amusing anime, praising its playful humor and unconventional treatment of kaiju conventions. It highlighted the reversal of the traditional relationship between a giant male monster and a vulnerable young woman, exemplified by King Kong (1933), and observed that the protagonist is not so much a girl who transforms into a monster as a monster who takes human form. The encyclopedia interpreted Kuroe's struggles with her identity and physical transformations as a metaphor for puberty and possibly gender dysphoria, emphasizing her sense of belonging fully to neither humanity nor the kaiju. Although it found the middle episodes somewhat slow, it considered the series entertaining overall, particularly for its pleasingly silly humor.
