= Koichi Ogata =

Japanese baseball player (born December 1968)

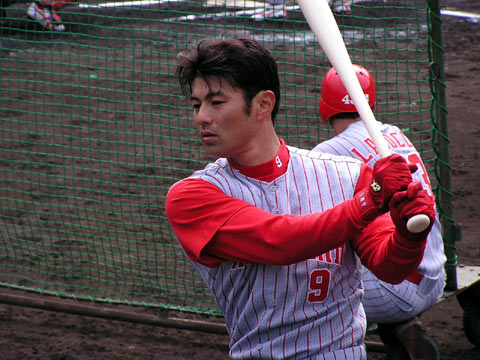
- Ogata with the Hiroshima Toyo Carp
- Manager
- Born: December 25, 1968 (age 57); Tosu, Saga, Japan
- Batted: Right Threw: Right

NPB debut
- September 17, 1988, for the Hiroshima Toyo Carp

Last NPB appearance
- October 10, 2009, for the Hiroshima Toyo Carp

NPB statistics (through 2009)
- Batting average: .282
- Hits: 1506
- Home runs: 241
- RBIs: 725
- Stolen bases: 268
- Stats at Baseball Reference

Teams
- As player: Hiroshima Toyo Carp (1988 – 2009); As manager: Hiroshima Toyo Carp (2015–2019); As coach: Hiroshima Toyo Carp (2010 – 2014)

Career highlights and awards
- 3× Stolen Base Champion (1995-1997); 5× Golden Glove Award (1995-1999); 1× Speed Up Award (2003); 1× NPB All-Star (1999)

Koichi Ogata (緒方 孝市, Ogata Kōichi; born December 25, 1968) is a Japanese former professional baseball player. Throughout his 22-year career, he played only with the Hiroshima Toyo Carp of the Nippon Professional Baseball (NPB).

He served as the manager of the Carp from 2015 to 2019, during which he won the Central League for three consecutive years (2016–2018).

His accomplishments as a player include:

- 200 home runs (241)
- 1500 games played (1808)
- 5000 at bats (5342)
- 1500 hits (1506)
- 900 runs (906)
- 200 doubles (257)
- 2500 total bases (2546)
- 200 stolen bases (268)
- 600 walks (630)

In 1996, he married singer Kanako Ogata; they had two daughters and a son, including singer and voice actress Yuna Ogata.
