= Yuna Ogata =

Japanese voice actress and singer (born 1997)

- 緒方 佑奈
- Born: 31 July 1997 (age 29)
- Occupations: Voice actress; singer
- Years active: 2019–present
- Agent: Hanaten Works
- Notable work: Cue! as Honoka Tsukii; An Adventurer's Daily Grind at Age 29 as Olive Carmen
- Parents: Koichi Ogata (father); Kanako Ogata (mother)
- Musical career
- Member of: Dialogue; Airblue

Yuna Ogata (Japanese: 緒方 佑奈, Hepburn: Ogata Yūna; born 31 July 1997) is a Japanese voice actress and singer from Hiroshima Prefecture, affiliated with Hanaten Works. A founding member of the voice acting unit Dialogue, she is also known for voicing Honoka Tsukii in Cue! and Olive Carmen in An Adventurer's Daily Grind at Age 29.

== Family, early life, and education ==
Yuna Ogata, a native of Hiroshima Prefecture, was born on 31 July 1997. She is the daughter of baseball player Koichi Ogata and television personality Kanako Ogata. She was educated at Hiroshima Nagisa Junior and Senior High School and Keio University Department of Literature and Social Sciences.

== Career ==
She initially intended to become an announcer, but discovered an interest in theatre after a friend invited her to join Keio's Theatrical Research Group. She eventually entered the Japan Narration Actor Institute, and after learning that several students enrolled to become voice actors, she realized she could still do narration work as a voice actor, so she settled on the latter.

In January 2018, she collaborated with her mother Kanako Ogata to produce a picture book in support of the Hiroshima Toyo Carp, a Nippon Professional Baseball team managed at the time by her father Koichi Ogata.

She joined the I'm Enterprise agency in April 2018. In 2019, she became one of the founding members of the voice acting unit Dialogue.

She voices Honoka Tsukii in the mobile game Cue!. She is also part of the game's seiyū unit Airblue and its sub-unit Airblue Flower, and she also performed in both Airblue Flower singles, both charting in the Top 40 of the Oricon Singles Chart. She reprised her role in the 2022 anime and the group released a single in January 2022 which appeared in the Oricon chart for 5 weeks and peaked in 7th place. The group's album, Talk About Bverything, appeared in the Top 10 of the Oricon Albums Chart for three weeks.

During the COVID-19 pandemic in Japan, she reportedly spent some spare time at home working out and making apple and strawberry candy at home to record herself making chewing sounds. In October 2022, she indefinitely suspended live performances and other physical activities for medical reasons. In May 2024, she announced on her monthly syndicated column for Seiyū Grand Prix magazine that she had launched a personal YouTube channel.

== Personal life ==
She is experienced in jazz dance and yosakoi. She enjoys visiting Shinto shrines and has listed the Shimogamo and Seimei shrines in Kyoto as her favorite shrines. Her favorite anime is the 2001 film Spirited Away.

== Filmography ==
=== Animated television ===
Year	Title	Role	Ref.
2019	A Certain Magical Index		
2019	Oshaberi Tōage Ageta-kun		
2020	Chihayafuru		
2020	Kaiketsu Zorori		
2021	Higehiro		
2021	I've Been Killing Slimes for 300 Years and Maxed Out My Level		
2021	Shadowverse		
2022	Cue!	Honoka Tsukii	
2022	Extreme Hearts	Ema Baily	
2022	Love After World Domination		
2022	Pokémon	Ann	
2022	The Strongest Sage with the Weakest Crest		
2023	Tomo-chan Is a Girl!		
2023	Too Cute Crisis	Hajime	
2026	An Adventurer's Daily Grind at Age 29	Olive Carmen	
2026	Magical Girl Lyrical Nanoha Exceeds Gun Blaze Vengeance	Raising Heart	

=== Original net animation ===
Year	Title	Role	Ref.
2020	Pokémon: Twilight Wings		

=== Video games ===
Year	Title	Role	Ref.
2019	Cue!	Honoka Tsukii	
2020	Baseball Superstars	Bora, Jenna, Rachel	
2020	Death End Request 2	Abigail Williams	
2020	Pro Yakyuu Famista 2020	Wonder Momo	
2020	Reverse Othellonia	Scheherazade	
2020	Shinobi Master Senran Kagura: New Link	Nachi	
2021	Black Surgenight	Chitose, Pensacola	
2021	Tales of Luminaria	Michelle Bouquet	
2022	Monster Strike	Amenosagiri	
