= List of sovereign states in the 1830s =

This is a list of sovereign states in the 1830s, giving an overview of states around the world during the period between 1 January 1830 and 31 December 1839. It contains entries, arranged alphabetically, with information on the status and recognition of their sovereignty. It includes widely recognized sovereign states, entities which were de facto sovereign but which were not widely recognized by other states.

== Sovereign states ==
=== A ===
- Andorra – Principality of Andorra
  Capital: Andorra la Vella
- Anhalt-Bernburg – Duchy of Anhalt-Bernburg
  Capital: Bernburg
- Anhalt-Dessau – Duchy of Anhalt-Dessau
  Capital: Dessau
- Anhalt-Köthen – Duchy of Anhalt-Köthen
  Capital: Köthen
- Ankole – Kingdom of Ankole
- Annam – Empire of Annam
  Capital: Huế
- Anziku – Anziku Kingdom
  Capital: Monsol
- → Argentina
  Capital: Buenos Aires
  - United Provinces of the Río de la Plata (to January 4, 1831)
  - Argentine Confederation (from January 4, 1831)
- Aro – Aro Confederacy
  Capital: Arochukwu
- Ashanti – Asante Union
  Capital: Kumasi
- Austria – Austrian Empire
  Capital: Vienna

=== B ===
- Baden – Grand Duchy of Baden
  Capital: Karlsruhe
- Baguirmi – Kingdom of Baguirmi
  Capital: Massenya
- Bambara – Bambara Empire
  Capital: Ségou
- Baol – Kingdom of Baol
  Capital: Diourbel
- Basutoland – Kingdom of Basutoland
  Capital: Maseru
- Bavaria – Kingdom of Bavaria
  Capital: Munich
- Belgium – Kingdom of Belgium (from October 4, 1830)
  Capital: Brussels
- Benin – Kingdom of Benin
  Capital: Benin City
- Bhutan – Kingdom of Bhutan
  Capital: Thimphu
- Bolivia – Bolivian Republic (to October 28, 1836, from August 25, 1839)
  Capital: Sucre
- Bornu – Bornu Empire
  Capital: Ngazargamu
- Brazil – Empire of Brazil
  Capital: Rio de Janeiro
- Bremen – Free City of Bremen
- Brunei – Sultanate of Brunei
  Capital: Bandar Seri Begawan
- Brunswick – Duchy of Brunswick
  Capital: Braunschweig
- Buganda – Kingdom of Buganda
  Capital: Mengo
- Bukhara – Emirate of Bukhara
  Capital: Bukhara
- Bunyoro – Kingdom of Bunyoro-Kitara
  Capital: Hoima
- Burma – Kingdom of Burma
  Capital: Ava
- Burundi – Kingdom of Burundi
  Capital: Bujumbura

=== C ===
- Cambodia – Kingdom of Cambodia
  Capital: Oudong
- Cayor – Kingdom of Cayor
  Capital: Mboul
- Central America – Federal Republic of Central America (to May 31, 1838)
  Capital: Guatemala City (to 1834), San Salvador (from 1834 to 1838)
- Chile – Republic of Chile
  Capital: Santiago
- China – Great Qing
  Capital: Beijing
- Colombia – Republic of Colombia (to November 19, 1831)
  Capital: Bogotá
- Costa Rica – Free State of Costa Rica (from November 14, 1838)
  Capital: San Jose

=== D ===
- Dahomey – Kingdom of Dahomey
  Capital: Abomey
- Dar al Kuti – Sultanate of Dar Al Kuti (from 1830)
  Capital: N'Délé
- Denmark – Kingdom of Denmark
  Capital: Copenhagen

=== E ===
- → Ecuador
  Capital: Quito
  - State of Ecuador (from May 13, 1830 to August 8, 1835)
  - Republic of Ecuador (from August 8, 1835)
- Ethiopia – Ethiopian Empire
  Capital: Addis Ababa

=== F ===
- Fiji – Tui Viti
  Capital: Suva
- → France – Kingdom of France
  Capital: Paris
- Frankfurt – Free City of Frankfurt
  Capital: Frankfurt am Main
- Futa Jallon – Imamate of Futa Jallon
  Capital: Timbo
- Futa Toro – Imamate of Futa Toro
  Capital: Orefonde

=== G ===
- Garo – Kingdom of Garo
- Gomma – Kingdom of Gomma
  Capital: Agaro
- Greece – Kingdom of Greece (from February 6, 1832)
  Capital: Athens
- Guatemala – Republic of Guatemala (from 1839)
  Capital: Guatemala City
- Gumma – Kingdom of Gumma

=== H ===
- Haiti – Republic of Haiti
  Capital: Port-au-Prince
- Hamburg – Free City of Hamburg
- → Hanover – Kingdom of Hanover
  Capital: Hanover
- Hawaii – Kingdom of Hawaii
  Capital: Lāhainā
- Hesse-Darmstadt – Grand Duchy of Hesse and by Rhine
  Capital: Darmstadt
- Hesse-Homburg – Landgraviate of Hesse-Homburg
  Capital: Bad Homburg
- Hesse-Kassel – Electorate of Hesse
  Capital: Kassel
- Hohenzollern-Hechingen – Principality of Hohenzollern-Hechingen
  Capital: Hechingen
- Hohenzollern-Sigmaringen – Principality of Hohenzollern-Sigmaringen
  Capital: Sigmaringen
- Honduras (from 1838)
- Holstein – Duchy of Holstein
  Capital: Glückstadt

=== J ===
- Jabal Shammar – Emirate of Jabal Shammar (from 1836)
  Capital: Ha'il
- Janjero – Kingdom of Janjero
  Capital: Fofa
- Japan – Tokugawa shogunate
  Capital: Edo
- Jimma – Kingdom of Jimma
  Capital: Jimma
- Johor – Johor Sultanate
  Capital: Tanjung Puteri
- Jolof – Jolof Kingdom
  Capital: Linguère
- Juliana Republic – Juliana Republic (from July 24 to November 15, 1839)
  Capital: Laguna, Santa Catarina

=== K ===
- Kaabu – Kingdom of Kaabu
  Capital: Kansala
- Kabul – Emirate of Kabul
  Capital: Kabul
- Kaffa – Kingdom of Kaffa
  Capital: Anderaccha
- Kénédougou – Kénédougou Kingdom
  Capital: Sikasso
- Khasso – Kingdom of Khasso
  Capital: Medina
- Khiva – Khanate of Khiva
  Capital: Khiva
- Kokand – Khanate of Kokand
  Capital: Kokand
- Kong – Kong Empire
  Capital: Kong
- Kongo – Kingdom of Kongo
  Capital: São Salvador
- Korea – Kingdom of Joseon
  Capital: Hanseong
- Koya Temne – Kingdom of Koya
  Capital: Cape Mount

=== L ===
- Liechtenstein – Principality of Liechtenstein
  Capital: Vaduz
- Limburg – Duchy of Limburg (from April 19, 1839)
- Limmu-Ennarea – Kingdom of Limmu-Ennarea
  Capital: Saqqa
- Lippe – Principality of Lippe-Detmoldt
  Capital: Detmold
- Loango – Kingdom of Loango
  Capital: Buali
- Luba – Luba Empire
- Lübeck – Free City of Lübeck
  Capital: Lübeck
- Lunda – Lunda Empire
- Luxembourg – Grand Duchy of Luxembourg
  Capital: Luxembourg City

=== M ===
- Maldives – Sultanate of Maldives
  Capital: Male
- Manipur – Kingdom of Manipur
  Capital: Imphal
- Massina – Massina Empire
  Capital: Hamdullahi
- Matabeleland – Matabele Kingdom (from 1837)
  Capital: Bulawayo
- Mecklenburg-Schwerin – Grand Duchy of Mecklenburg-Schwerin
  Capital: Schwerin
- Mecklenburg-Strelitz – Grand Duchy of Mecklenburg-Strelitz
  Capital: Neustrelitz
- → Mexico
  Capital: Mexico City
  - Mexican Republic (to October 23, 1835)
  - Centralist Republic (from October 23, 1835)
- Mindanao – Sultanate of Maguindanao
  Capital: Cotabato City
- Modena – Duchies of Modena and Reggio
  Capital: Modena
- Moldavia – Principality of Moldavia
  Capital: Iași
- Monaco – Principality of Monaco
  Capital: Monaco City
- Montenegro – Prince-Bishopric of Montenegro
  Capital: Cetinje
- Morocco – Sultanate of Morocco
  Capital: Fes

=== N ===
- Najd – Emirate of Najd
  Capital: Riyadh
- Najran – Principality of Najran
- Nassau – Duchy of Nassau
  Capital: Wiesbaden
- Nepal – Kingdom of Nepal
  Capital: Kathmandu
- Netherlands
  Capital: Amsterdam
  - United Kingdom of the Netherlands (to April 19, 1839)
  - Kingdom of the Netherlands (from April 19, 1839)
- → New Granada – Republic of New Granada (from October 20, 1831)
  Capital: Santa Fé de Bogotá
- Nicaragua – Republic of Nicaragua (from April 30, 1838)
  Capital: Managua
- Norway – Kingdom of Norway (in personal union with Sweden)
  Capital: Oslo

=== O ===
- Oldenburg – Grand Duchy of Oldenburg
  Capital: Oldenburg
- Ottoman Empire – Sublime Ottoman State
  Capital: Constantinople
- Ouaddai – Ouaddai Empire
  Capital: Abeche
- Oyo – Oyo Empire
  Capital: Oyo Ile

=== P ===
- Pahang – Sultanate of Pahang
  Capital: Kuantan
- Papal States – States of the Church
  Capital: Rome
- Paraguay – Republic of Paraguay
  Capital: Asunción
- Parma – Duchy of Parma, Piacenza and Guastalla
  Capital: Parma
- Perak – Sultanate of Perak
  Capital: Ipoh
- Persia – Persian Empire
  Capital: Tehran
- Peru – Peruvian Republic (to October 28, 1836, from August 25, 1839)
  Capital: Lima
- Peru, North – Republic of North Peru (from August 11 to October 28, 1836)
  Capital: Lima
- Peru, South – Republic of South Peru (from March 17 to October 28, 1836)
  Capital: Tacna
- Peru-Bolivian Confederation (from October 28, 1836 to August 25, 1839)
  Capital: Tacna
- Poland – Congress Poland during November Uprising (from November 29, 1830 to October 5, 1831)
- Portugal – Kingdom of Portugal
  Capital: Lisbon
  - Kingdom of Portugal and the Algarves (to 1834)
  - Kingdom of Portugal and the Algarves (from 1834)
- Prussia – Kingdom of Prussia
  Capital: Berlin
- Punjab – Sikh Empire
  Capital: Lahore

=== R ===
- Rapa Nui – Kingdom of Rapa Nui
- Reuss Elder Line – Principality of Reuss Elder Line
  Capital: Greiz
- Reuss Junior Line – Principality of Reuss Junior Line
  Capital: Gera
- Reuss-Lobenstein-Ebersdorf – Principality of Reuss-Lobenstein-Ebersdorf
  Capital: Ebersdorf
- Russia – Russian Empire
  Capital: St. Petersburg
- Rwanda – Kingdom of Rwanda
  Capital: Nyanza, Rwanda
- Ryūkyū Kingdom – Kingdom of Ryūkyū
  Capital: Shuri

=== S ===
- Samoa – Kingdom of Samoa
  Capital: Apia
- San Marino – Most Serene Republic of San Marino
  Capital: San Marino
- Sardinia – Kingdom of Sardinia
  Capital: Turin
- Saxe-Altenburg – Duchy of Saxe-Altenburg
  Capital: Altenburg
- Saxe-Coburg-Gotha – Duchy of Saxe-Coburg and Gotha
  Capital: Coburg, Gotha
- Saxe-Meiningen – Duchy of Saxe-Meiningen
  Capital: Meiningen
- Saxe-Weimar-Eisenach – Grand Duchy of Saxe-Weimar-Eisenach
  Capital: Weimar
- Saxony – Kingdom of Saxony
  Capital: Dresden
- Schaumburg-Lippe – Principality of Schaumburg-Lippe
  Capital: Bückeburg
- Schleswig – Duchy of Schleswig
  Capital: Schleswig, Flensburg, Copenhagen
- Schwarzburg-Rudolstadt – Principality of Schwarzburg-Rudolstadt
  Capital: Rudolstadt
- Schwarzburg-Sondershausen – Principality of Schwarzburg-Sondershausen
  Capital: Sondershausen
- Selangor – Sultanate of Selangor
  Capital: Shah Alam
- Serbia – Principality of Serbia
  Capital: Belgrade, Kragujevac (to 1838)
- (Thailand) Siam – Kingdom of Siam
  Capital: Bangkok
- Sikkim – Chogyalate of Sikkim
  Capital: Gangtok
- Sokoto – Sokoto Caliphate
  Capital: Sokoto
- Spain – Kingdom of Spain
  Capital: Madrid
- Sulu – Sultanate of Sulu
  Capital: Astana Putih
- Sweden – Kingdom of Sweden (in personal union with Norway)
  Capital: Stockholm
- Switzerland – Swiss Confederation
  Capital: Bern

=== T ===
- Tahiti – Kingdom of Tahiti
  Capital: Papeete
- Tonga – Tu'i Tonga
  Capital: Nuku'alofa
- Toro – Toro Kingdom
- Toucouleur – Toucouleur Empire
  Capital: Segou
- Tuscany – Grand Duchy of Tuscany
  Capital: Florence
- Two Sicilies – Kingdom of the Two Sicilies
  Capital: Naples

=== U ===
- United Kingdom – United Kingdom of Great Britain and Ireland
  Capital: London
- United States – United States of America
  Capital: Washington D.C.
- United States of the Ionian Islands – United States of the Ionian Islands
  Capital: Corfu
- Uruguay – Eastern Republic of Uruguay
  Capital: Montevideo

=== V ===
- → Venezuela – State of Venezuela (from January 13, 1830)
  Capital: Caracas

=== W ===
- → Waldeck-Pyrmont – Principality of Waldeck and Pyrmont
  Capital: Arolsen
- Welayta – Kingdom of Welayta
  Capital: Sodo
- Württemberg – Kingdom of Württemberg
  Capital: Stuttgart

=== Z ===
- Zululand – Kingdom of the Zulus
  Capital: kwaBulawayo, umGungundlovu, Ulundi

== States claiming sovereignty ==
- Aceh – Sultanate of Aceh
- Goust – Republic of Goust
- Greece – Hellenic Republic (to June 18, 1832)
- Natalia – Natalia Republic (from October 12, 1839)
  Capital: Pietermaritzburg
- Republic of Indian Stream – Republic of Indian Stream (from July 9 to 1835)
- Muskogee – State of Muskogee (to 1832)
- Riograndense Republic (from September 11, 1836)
- Soran – Soran Emirate (to 1835)
- Tavolara – Kingdom of Tavolara (from 1836)
- Texas – Republic of Texas, from March 2, 1836 (several capitals). Sovereignty disputed by Mexico.

== See also ==
- List of Bronze Age states
- List of Iron Age states
- List of Classical Age states
- List of states during Late Antiquity
- List of states during the Middle Ages

Political entities in the 19th century
Preceded by 1820s	Political entities in the 1830s	Succeeded by 1840s
