= List of sovereign states in the 1820s =

== Sovereign states ==
=== A ===
- Andorra – Principality of Andorra
  Capital: Andorra la Vella
- Anhalt-Bernburg – Duchy of Anhalt-Bernburg
  Capital: Bernburg
- Anhalt-Dessau – Duchy of Anhalt-Dessau
  Capital: Dessau
- Anhalt-Köthen – Duchy of Anhalt-Köthen
  Capital: Köthen
- Ankole – Kingdom of Ankole
  Capital: Mbarara
- Annam – Empire of Annam
  Capital: Huế
- Anziku – Anziku Kingdom
  Capital: Monsol
- Argentina - United Provinces of the River Plate
  Capital: Buenos Aires
- Aro – Aro Confederacy
  Capital: Arochukwu
- Ashanti – Asante Union
  Capital: Kumasi
- Austria – Austrian Empire
  Capital: Vienna

=== B ===
- Baden – Grand Duchy of Baden
- Baguirmi – Kingdom of Baguirmi
- Bambara – Bambara Empire
- Baol – Kingdom of Baol
- Basutoland – Kingdom of Basutoland
- Bavaria – Kingdom of Bavaria
- Benin – Benin Empire
- Bhutan – Kingdom of Bhutan
- → Bolivia – Bolivian Republic (from August 6, 1825)
- Bornu – Bornu Empire
- Brazil – Empire of Brazil (from September 7, 1822)
- Bremen – Free City of Bremen
- Brunei – Sultanate of Brunei
- Brunswick – Duchy of Brunswick
- Buganda – Kingdom of Buganda
- Bukhara – Emirate of Bukhara
- Bunyoro – Kingdom of Bunyoro-Kitara
- Burma – Kingdom of Burma
- Burundi – Kingdom of Burundi

=== C ===
- Cambodia – Kingdom of Cambodia
- Cayor – Kingdom of Cayor
- → Central America
  - United Provinces of Central America (from July 1, 1823 to 1824)
  - Federal Republic of Central America (from 1824)
- → Chile
  - State of Chile (to July 14, 1826)
  - Republic of Chile (from July 14, 1826)
- China – Great Qing Empire
- → → Colombia – Republic of Colombia
- Cospaia – Republic of Cospaia

=== D ===
- Dahomey – Kingdom of Dahomey
- Denmark – Kingdom of Denmark
- Durrani – Durrani Empire (to 1823)

=== E ===
- Ethiopia – Ethiopian Empire

=== F ===
- Fiji – Tui Viti
- → France – Kingdom of France
- Frankfurt – Free City of Frankfurt
- Futa Jallon – Imamate of Futa Jallon
- Futa Toro – Imamate of Futa Toro

=== G ===
- Garo – Kingdom of Garo
- Gomma – Kingdom of Gomma
- Gumma – Kingdom of Gumma

=== H ===
- → Haiti
  - Kingdom of Haiti (to October 8, 1820)
  - Republic of Haiti (from October 8, 1820)
- Hamburg – Free City of Hamburg
- Hanover – Kingdom of Hanover
- Hawaii – Kingdom of Hawaii
- Hesse-Darmstadt – Grand Duchy of Hesse and by Rhine
- Hesse-Homburg – Landgraviate of Hesse-Homburg
- Hesse-Kassel (or Hesse-Cassel) – Electorate of Hesse
- Hohenzollern-Hechingen – Principality of Hohenzollern-Hechingen
- Hohenzollern-Sigmaringen – Principality of Hohenzollern-Sigmaringen
- Holstein – Duchy of Holstein

=== I ===
- Ionian Islands – United States of the Ionian Islands

=== J ===
- Janjero – Kingdom of Janjero
- Japan – Tokugawa shogunate
- Jimma – Kingdom of Jimma
- Johor – Johor Sultanate
- Jolof – Jolof Kingdom

=== K ===
- Kaabu – Kingdom of Kaabu
- Kabul – Emirate of Kabul (from 1823)
- Kaffa – Kingdom of Kaffa
- Kénédougou – Kénédougou Kingdom
- Khasso – Kingdom of Khasso
- Khiva – Khanate of Khiva
- Kokand – Khanate of Kokand
- Kong – Kong Empire
- Kongo – Kingdom of Kongo
- Korea – Kingdom of Great Joseon
- Koya Temne – Kingdom of Koya

=== L ===
- Liechtenstein – Principality of Liechtenstein
- Limmu-Ennarea – Kingdom of Limmu-Ennarea
- Lippe – Principality of Lippe-Detmoldt
- Loango – Kingdom of Loango
- Luba – Luba Empire
- Lubeck – Free City of Lubeck
- Lunda – Lunda Empire
- Luxembourg – Grand Duchy of Luxembourg

=== M ===
- Madawaska – Republic of Madawaska (July 4 1827- September 25 1827)
- Maldives – Sultanate of Maldives
- Manipur – Kingdom of Manipur
- Massina – Massina Empire
- Mecklenburg-Schwerin – Grand Duchy of Mecklenburg-Schwerin
- Mecklenburg-Strelitz – Grand Duchy of Mecklenburg-Strelitz
- → → Mexico (from July 21, 1821)
  - Mexican Empire (from July 21, 1821 to March 19, 1823)
  - Provisional Government of Mexico (from March 19, 1823 to October 10, 1824)
  - Mexican Republic (from October 10, 1824)
- Mindanao – Sultanate of Maguindanao
- Modena – Duchies of Modena and Reggio
- Moldavia – Principality of Moldavia
- Monaco – Principality of Monaco
- Montenegro – Prince-Bishopric of Montenegro
- Morocco – Sultanate of Morocco

=== N ===
- Najd – Emirate of Najd (from 1824)
- Najran – Principality of Najran
- Nassau – Duchy of Nassau
- Nepal – Kingdom of Nepal
- Netherlands – United Kingdom of the Netherlands
- Norway – Kingdom of Norway (in a personal union with Sweden)

=== O ===
- Oldenburg – Grand Duchy of Oldenburg
- Ottoman Empire – Sublime Ottoman State
- Ouaddai – Ouaddai Empire
- Oyo – Oyo Empire

=== P ===
- Pahang – Sultanate of Pahang
- Papal States – States of the Church
- → Paraguay – Republic of Paraguay
- Parma – Duchy of Parma, Piacenza and Guastalla
- Perak – Sultanate of Perak
- Persia – Persian Empire
- → → → Peru (from July 28, 1821)
  - Supreme Governing Junta (from July 20, 1822 to February 1823)
  - Peruvian Republic (from February 27, 1823)
- Portugal – Kingdom of Portugal (from 1822)
- Portugal, Brazil and the Algarves – United Kingdom of Portugal, Brazil and the Algarves (to 1822)
- Prussia – Kingdom of Prussia
- Punjab – Sikh Empire

=== R ===
- Rapa Nui – Kingdom of Rapa Nui
- Reuss-Ebersdorf – Principality of Reuss-Ebersdorf (to 1824)
- Reuss Elder Line – Principality of Reuss Elder Line
- Reuss-Lobenstein – Principality of Reuss-Lobenstein (to 1824)
- Reuss-Lobenstein-Ebersdorf – Principality of Reuss-Lobenstein-Ebersdorf (from 1824)
- Reuss Junior Line – Principality of Reuss Junior Line
- Russia – Russian Empire
- Rwanda – Kingdom of Rwanda
- Ryūkyū Kingdom – Kingdom of Ryūkyū

=== S ===
- Samoa – Kingdom of Samoa
- San Marino – Most Serene Republic of San Marino
- Sardinia – Kingdom of Sardinia
- Saxe-Altenburg – Duchy of Saxe-Altenburg (from 1826)
- Saxe-Coburg-Saalfeld – Duchy of Saxe-Coburg-Saalfeld (to 1826)
- Saxe-Coburg-Gotha – Duchy of Saxe-Coburg and Gotha (from 1826)
- Saxe-Gotha-Altenburg – Duchy of Saxe-Gotha-Altenburg (to 1826)
- Saxe-Hildburghausen – Duchy of Saxe-Hildburghausen (to 1826)
- Saxe-Meiningen – Duchy of Saxe-Meiningen
- Saxe-Weimar-Eisenach – Grand Duchy of Saxe-Weimar-Eisenach
- Saxony – Kingdom of Saxony
- Schaumburg-Lippe – Principality of Schaumburg-Lippe
- Schleswig – Duchy of Schleswig
- Schwarzburg-Rudolstadt – Principality of Schwarzburg-Rudolstadt
- Schwarzburg-Sondershausen – Principality of Schwarzburg-Sondershausen
- Selangor – Sultanate of Selangor
- (Thailand) Siam – Kingdom of Siam
- Sikkim – Chogyalate of Sikkim
- Sokoto – Sokoto Caliphate
- Spain – Kingdom of Spain
- Sulu – Sultanate of Sulu
- Sweden – Kingdom of Sweden (in personal union with Norway)
- Switzerland – Swiss Confederation

=== T ===
- Tahiti – Kingdom of Tahiti
- Tonga – Tu'i Tonga
- Toro – Toro Kingdom (from 1822)
- Tuscany – Grand Duchy of Tuscany
- Two Sicilies – Kingdom of the Two Sicilies

=== U ===
- United Kingdom – United Kingdom of Great Britain and Ireland
- → United States – United States of America

=== W ===
- Waldeck-Pyrmont – Principality of Waldeck and Pyrmont
- Welayta – Kingdom of Welayta
- Württemberg – Kingdom of Württemberg

=== Z ===
- Zululand – Kingdom of the Zulus

== States claiming sovereignty ==
- Equator – Confederation of the Equator (from 2 July 1823 to September or October 1823)
- Goust – Republic of Goust
- Greece – Hellenic Republic (from January 1, 1822)
- Muskogee – State of Muskogee
- Soran – Soran Emirate

== See also ==
- List of Bronze Age states
- List of Iron Age states
- List of Classical Age states
- List of states during Late Antiquity
- List of states during the Middle Ages

Political entities in the 19th century
Preceded by 1810s	Political entities in the 1820s	Succeeded by 1830s
