= List of sovereign states in the 1840s =

This is a list of sovereign states in the 1840s, giving an overview of states around the world during the period between 1 January 1840 and 31 December 1849. It contains entries, arranged alphabetically, with information on the status and recognition of their sovereignty. It includes widely recognized sovereign states, entities which were de facto sovereign but which were not widely recognized by other states.

== Sovereign states ==
=== A ===
- Abdelkader – Emirate of Abdelkader (to 1847)
  Capital: Tagdemt
- Andorra – Principality of Andorra
  Capital: Andorra la Vella
- Anhalt-Bernburg – Duchy of Anhalt-Bernburg
  Capital: Bernburg
- Anhalt-Dessau – Duchy of Anhalt-Dessau
  Capital: Dessau
- Anhalt-Köthen – Duchy of Anhalt-Köthen
  Capital: Köthen
- Ankole – Kingdom of Ankole
- Annam – Empire of Annam
  Capital: Huế
- Anziku – Anziku Kingdom
  Capital: Monsol
- Argentina – Argentine Confederation
  Capital: Buenos Aires
- Aro – Aro Confederacy
  Capital: Arochukwu
- Ashanti – Asante Union
  Capital: Kumasi
- Austria – Austrian Empire
  Capital: Vienna

=== B ===
- Baden – Grand Duchy of Baden
  Capital: Karlsruhe
- Baguirmi – Kingdom of Baguirmi
  Capital: Massenya
- Bambara – Bambara Empire
  Capital: Ségou
- Baol – Kingdom of Baol
  Capital: Diourbel
- Basutoland – Kingdom of Basutoland
  Capital: Maseru
- Bavaria – Kingdom of Bavaria
  Capital: Munich
- Belgium – Kingdom of Belgium
  Capital: Brussels
- Benin – Benin Empire
  Capital: Benin City
- Bhutan – Kingdom of Bhutan
  Capital: Thimphu
- Bolivia – Bolivian Republic (to October 28, 1836, from August 25, 1839)
  Capital: Sucre
- Bornu – Bornu Empire
  Capital: Ngazargamu
- Brazil – Empire of Brazil
  Capital: Rio de Janeiro
- Bremen – Free City of Bremen
- Brunei – Sultanate of Brunei
  Capital: Bandar Seri Begawan
- Brunswick – Duchy of Brunswick
  Capital: Braunschweig
- Buganda – Kingdom of Buganda
  Capital: Mengo
- Bukhara – Emirate of Bukhara
  Capital: Bukhara
- Bunyoro – Kingdom of Bunyoro-Kitara
  Capital: Hoima
- Burma – Kingdom of Burma
  Capital: Ava
- Burundi – Kingdom of Burundi
  Capital: Bujumbura

=== C ===
- Cambodia – Kingdom of Cambodia
  Capital: Oudong
- Cayor – Kingdom of Cayor
  Capital: Mboul
- Chile – Republic of Chile
  Capital: Santiago
- China – Great Qing Empire
  Capital: Beijing
- Comancheria
- → → → Costa Rica
  Capital: San Jose
  - Free State of Costa Rica (to August 31, 1847)
  - Republic of Costa Rica (from August 31, 1848)

=== D ===
- Dahomey – Kingdom of Dahomey
  Capital: Abomey
- Dar al Kuti – Sultanate of Dar Al Kuti
  Capital: N'Délé
- Denmark – Kingdom of Denmark
  Capital: Copenhagen
- → Dominican Republic – Dominican Republic (from February 27, 1844)
  Capital: Santo Domingo

=== E ===
- Ecuador – Republic of Ecuador
  Capital: Quito
- El Salvador – El Salvador
  Capital: San Salvador
- Ethiopia – Ethiopian Empire
  Capital: Gondar

=== F ===
- Fiji – Tui Viti
  Capital: Suva
- → → France
  Capital: Paris
  - Kingdom of France (to February 23, 1848)
  - French Republic (from February 23, 1848)
- Frankfurt – Free City of Frankfurt
  Capital: Frankfurt am Main
- Futa Jallon – Imamate of Futa Jallon
  Capital: Timbo
- Futa Toro – Imamate of Futa Toro
  Capital: Orefonde

=== G ===
- Garo – Kingdom of Garo
- Gomma – Kingdom of Gomma
  Capital: Agaro
- Greece – Kingdom of Greece
  Capital: Athens
- → Guatemala – Republic of Guatemala
  Capital: Guatemala City
- Gumma – Kingdom of Gumma

=== H ===
- → Haiti
  Capital: Port-au-Prince
  - Republic of Haiti (to August 26, 1849)
  - Empire of Haiti (from August 26, 1849)
- Hamburg – Free city of Hamburg
  Capital: Hamburg
- Hanover – Kingdom of Hanover
  Capital: Hanover
- → Hawaii – Kingdom of Hawaii
  Capital: Lāhainā
- Hesse-Darmstadt – Grand Duchy of Hesse and by Rhine
  Capital: Darmstadt
- Hesse-Homburg – Landgraviate of Hesse-Homburg
  Capital: Bad Homburg
- Hesse-Kassel – Electorate of Hesse
  Capital: Kassel
- Hohenzollern-Hechingen – Principality of Hohenzollern-Hechingen
  Capital: Hechingen
- Hohenzollern-Sigmaringen – Principality of Hohenzollern-Sigmaringen
  Capital: Sigmaringen
- Holstein – Duchy of Holstein
  Capital: Glückstadt
- Honduras – Republic of Honduras
  Capital: Tegucigalpa
- Hyderabad State – State of Hyderabad
  Capital: Hyderabad

=== J ===
- Jabal Shammar – Emirate of Jabal Shammar
  Capital: Ha'il
- Janjero – Kingdom of Janjero
  Capital: Fofa
- Japan – Tokugawa shogunate
  Capital: Edo
- Jimma – Kingdom of Jimma
  Capital: Jimma
- Johor – Johor Sultanate
  Capital: Tanjung Puteri
- Jolof – Jolof Kingdom
  Capital: Linguère

=== K ===
- Kaabu – Kingdom of Kaabu
  Capital: Kansala
- Kabul – Emirate of Kabul
  Capital: Kabul
- Kaffa – Kingdom of Kaffa
  Capital: Anderaccha
- Kénédougou – Kénédougou Kingdom
  Capital: Sikasso
- Khasso – Kingdom of Khasso
  Capital: Médine
- Khiva – Khanate of Khiva
  Capital: Khiva
- Kokand – Khanate of Kokand
  Capital: Kokand
- Kong – Kong Empire
  Capital: Kong
- Kongo – Kingdom of Kongo
  Capital: São Salvador
- Korea – Kingdom of Great Joseon
  Capital: Hanseong
- Koya Temne – Kingdom of Koya
  Capital: Cape Mount

=== L ===
- Liechtenstein – Principality of Liechtenstein
  Capital: Vaduz
- Limburg – Duchy of Limburg
- Limmu-Ennarea – Kingdom of Limmu-Ennarea
  Capital: Saqqa
- Lippe – Principality of Lippe-Detmoldt
  Capital: Detmold
- Loango – Kingdom of Loango
  Capital: Buali
- Luba – Luba Empire
  Capital: Mwibele
- Lübeck – Free City of Lübeck
  Capital: Lübeck
- Lunda – Lunda Empire
- Luxembourg – Grand Duchy of Luxembourg
  Capital: Luxembourg City

=== M ===
- Maldives – Sultanate of Maldives
  Capital: Male
- Manipur – Kingdom of Manipur
  Capital: Imphal
- Massina – Massina Empire
  Capital: Hamdullahi
- Matabeleland – Matabele Kingdom
  Capital: Bulawayo
- Mecklenburg-Schwerin – Grand Duchy of Mecklenburg-Schwerin
  Capital: Schwerin
- Mecklenburg-Strelitz – Grand Duchy of Mecklenburg-Strelitz
  Capital: Neustrelitz
- → Mexico
  Capital: Mexico City
  - Centralist Republic (to August 22, 1846)
  - Second Federal Republic (from August 22, 1846)
- Mindanao – Sultanate of Maguindanao
  Capital: Cotabato City
- Modena – Duchies of Modena and Reggio
  Capital: Modena
- Moldavia – Principality of Moldavia
  Capital: Iași
- Monaco – Principality of Monaco
  Capital: Monaco City
- Montenegro – Prince-Bishopric of Montenegro
  Capital: Cetinje
- Morocco – Sultanate of Morocco
  Capital: Fes

=== N ===
- Najd – Emirate of Najd
  Capital: Riyadh
- Najran – Principality of Najran
- Nassau – Duchy of Nassau
  Capital: Wiesbaden
- Natalia – Natalia Republic
  Capital: Pietermaritzburg (to May 12, 1843)
- Nepal – Kingdom of Nepal
  Capital: Kathmandu
- Netherlands – Kingdom of the Netherlands
  Capital: Amsterdam
- New Granada – Republic of New Granada
  Capital: Santa Fé de Bogotá
- Nicaragua – Republic of Nicaragua
  Capital: Managua
- Norway – Kingdom of Norway (in personal union with Sweden)
  Capital: Oslo

=== O ===
- Oldenburg – Grand Duchy of Oldenburg
  Capital: Oldenburg (city)
- → Ottoman Empire – Sublime Ottoman State
  Capital: Constantinople
- Ouaddai – Ouaddai Empire
  Capital: Abeche
- Oyo – Oyo Empire
  Capital: Oyo Ile

=== P ===
- Pahang – Sultanate of Pahang
  Capital: Kuantan
- Papal States – States of the Church
  Capital: Rome
- → Paraguay – Republic of Paraguay
  Capital: Asunción
- Parma – Duchy of Parma, Piacenza and Guastalla
  Capital: Parma
- Perak – Sultanate of Perak
  Capital: Ipoh
- Persia – Persian Empire
  Capital: Tehran
- Peru – Peruvian Republic
  Capital: Lima
- → Portugal – Kingdom of Portugal
  Capital: Lisbon
- Prussia – Kingdom of Prussia
  Capital: Berlin
- Punjab – Sikh Empire
  Capital: Lahore

=== R ===
- Rapa Nui – Kingdom of Rapa Nui
- Reuss Elder Line – Principality of Reuss Elder Line
  Capital: Greiz
- Reuss Junior Line – Principality of Reuss Junior Line
  Capital: Gera
- Russia – Russian Empire
  Capital: St. Petersburg
- Rwanda – Kingdom of Rwanda
  Capital: Nyanza, Rwanda
- Ryūkyū Kingdom – Kingdom of Ryūkyū
  Capital: Shuri

=== S ===
- Samoa – Kingdom of Samoa
  Capital: Apia
- San Marino – Most Serene Republic of San Marino
  Capital: San Marino
- Sarawak – Kingdom of Sarawak (from September 24, 1841)
  Capital: Kuching
- Sardinia – Kingdom of Sardinia
  Capital: Turin
- Saxe-Altenburg – Duchy of Saxe-Altenburg
  Capital: Altenburg
- Saxe-Coburg-Gotha – Duchy of Saxe-Coburg and Gotha
  Capital: Coburg, Gotha
- Saxe-Meiningen – Duchy of Saxe-Meiningen
  Capital: Meiningen
- Saxe-Weimar-Eisenach – Grand Duchy of Saxe-Weimar-Eisenach
  Capital: Weimar
- Saxony – Kingdom of Saxony
  Capital: Dresden
- Schaumburg-Lippe – Principality of Schaumburg-Lippe
  Capital: Bückeburg
- Schleswig – Duchy of Schleswig
  Capital: Schleswig, Flensburg, Copenhagen
- Schwarzburg-Rudolstadt – Principality of Schwarzburg-Rudolstadt
  Capital: Rudolstadt
- Schwarzburg-Sondershausen – Principality of Schwarzburg-Sondershausen
  Capital: Sondershausen
- Selangor – Sultanate of Selangor
  Capital: Shah Alam
- Serbia – Principality of Serbia
  Capital: Belgrade
- (Thailand) Siam – Kingdom of Siam
  Capital: Bangkok
- Sikkim – Chogyalate of Sikkim
  Capital: Gangtok
- Sokoto – Sokoto Caliphate
  Capital: Sokoto
- Spain – Kingdom of Spain
  Capital: Madrid
- Sulu – Sultanate of Sulu
  Capital: Astana Putih
- Sweden – Kingdom of Sweden (in personal union with Norway)
  Capital: Stockholm
- Switzerland
  Capital: Bern
  - Swiss Confederation (to September 12, 1848)
  - Swiss Confederation (from September 12, 1848)

=== T ===
- → Tahiti – Kingdom of Tahiti
  Capital: Papeete
- Tonga – Tu'i Tonga
  Capital: Nuku'alofa
- Toro – Toro Kingdom
- Toucouleur – Toucouleur Empire
  Capital: Segou
- Tuscany – Grand Duchy of Tuscany
  Capital: Florence
- Two Sicilies – Kingdom of the Two Sicilies
  Capital: Naples

=== U ===
- United Kingdom – United Kingdom of Great Britain and Ireland
  Capital: London
- United States – United States of America
  Capital: Washington D.C.
- United States of the Ionian Islands – United States of the Ionian Islands
  Capital: Corfu
- Uruguay – Eastern Republic of Uruguay
  Capital: Montevideo

=== V ===
- Venezuela – Republic of Venezuela
  Capital: Caracas

=== W ===
- Waldeck-Pyrmont – Principality of Waldeck and Pyrmont
  Capital: Arolsen
- Welayta – Kingdom of Welayta
  Capital: Sodo
- Württemberg – Kingdom of Württemberg
  Capital: Stuttgart

=== Z ===
- Zululand – Kingdom of the Zulus
  Capital: kwaBulawayo, umGungundlovu, Ulundi

== States claiming sovereignty ==
- Aceh – Sultanate of Aceh
  Capital: Kutaraja
- Germany – German Empire (from March 28, 1848)
  Capital: Frankfurt
- Goust – Republic of Goust
  Capital: Goust
- Hungary – Hungarian State (from April 14 – August 13, 1849)
  Capital: Buda
- Riogranda – Riograndense Republic
  Capital: Piratini (city)
- Rio Grande – Republic of the Rio Grande (from January 17 – November 6, 1840)
  Capital: Laredo
- Tavolara – Kingdom of Tavolara
  Capital: Tavolara
- Texas – Republic of Texas
  Capital: Austin
- Yucátan – Republic of Yucatán (from March 16, 1841)
  Capital: Mérida

== See also ==
- List of Bronze Age states
- List of Iron Age states
- List of Classical Age states
- List of states during Late Antiquity
- List of states during the Middle Ages

Political entities in the 19th century
Preceded by 1830s	Political entities in the 1840s	Succeeded by 1850s
