= List of sovereign states in the 1850s =

This is a list of sovereign states in the 1850s, giving an overview of states around the world during the period between 1 January 1850 and 31 December 1859. It contains entries, arranged alphabetically, with information on the status and recognition of their sovereignty. It includes widely recognized sovereign states, entities which were de facto sovereign but which were not widely recognized by other states.

== Sovereign states ==
=== A ===
Name and capital city	Information on status and recognition of sovereignty
=== A ===
Abemama – Kingdom of Abemama; Capital: Abemama	Widely recognized state.
Abuja – Abuja Emirate; Capital: Abuja	Widely recognized state.
Afghanistan – Emirate of Afghanistan (from 1855); Capital: Kabul	Widely recognized independent state from 1855.
Agadez – Tenere Sultanate of Aïr; Capital: Agadez	Widely recognized state.
Alawi Sheikhdom – Alawi Sheikhdom; Capital: Al Qasha	Widely recognized state.
Andorra – Principality of Andorra; Capital: Andorra la Vella	Widely recognized independent state. The President of France and Bishop of Urgell were ex officio Co-Princes of Andorra. The defense of Andorra was the responsibility of France and Spain.
Angoche – Angoche Sultanate; Capital: Angoche	Widely recognized independent state.
Anhalt-Bernburg – Duchy of Anhalt-Bernburg; Capital: Bernburg	Widely recognized independent state. Member of the German Confederation.
Anhalt-Dessau – Duchy of Anhalt-Dessau Capital: Dessau	Widely recognized independent state. Member of the German Confederation.
Anhalt-Köthen – Duchy of Anhalt-Köthen (to 22 May 1853); Capital: Köthen	Widely recognized independent state to 22 May 1853. Member of the German Confederation. Merged to Anhalt-Dessau on 22 May 1853.
Ankole – Kingdom of Ankole; Capital: Mbarara	Widely recognized state.
Annam – Empire of Annam; Capital: Phú Xuân	Widely recognized state. Internal imperial system within Chinese tributary.
Anziku – Anziku Kingdom; Capital: Monsol	Widely recognized state.
Aqrabi – Aqrabi Sheikhdom; Capital: Bir Ahmad	Widely recognized state.
Argentina – Argentine Confederation Capital: Paraná, Entre Ríos (from 1853)	Widely recognized state.
Aro – Aro Confederacy; Capital: Arochukwu	Widely recognized state.
Ashanti – Asante Union; Capital: Kumasi	Widely recognized state.
Aussa – Sultanate of Aussa; Capital: Aussa	Widely recognized state.
Austria – Austrian Empire; Capital: Vienna	Widely recognized state.
Avaria – Avar Khanate; Capital: Khunzakh	Widely recognized state.
=== B ===
Baden – Grand Duchy of Baden; Capital: Karlsruhe	Widely recognized state. Member of the German Confederation.
Baguirmi – Kingdom of Baguirmi; Capital: Massenya	Tributary state of the Bornu Empire.
Badgini – Sultanate of Badgini; Capital: Foumbouni	Widely recognized state.
Bahrain; Capital: Muharraq	Widely recongized state.
Bali – Kingdom of Bali; Capital: Klungkung	Widely recognized state. Bali was a series of kingdoms that ruled the island of Bali.
Bamana – Bamana Empire; Capital: Ségou	Widely recognized state.
Baol – Kingdom of Baol; Capital: Diourbel	Widely recognized state.
Basutoland – Kingdom of Basutoland; Capital: Maseru	Widely recognized state.
Baté – Baté Empire; Capital: Kankan	Widely recognized state.
Bavaria – Kingdom of Bavaria; Capital: Munich	Widely recognized state. Member of the German Confederation.
Belgium – Kingdom of Belgium; Capital: Brussels	Widely recognized state. Belgium has sovereignty over 1 condominium: Moresnet (Condominium sui iuris of Belgium and Prussia)
Beni Abbas – Kingdom of Beni Abbas; Capital: Kalâa of Ait Abbas	Widely recognized state.
Benin – Kingdom of Benin; Capital: Edo	Widely recognized state.
Bhutan – Kingdom of Bhutan; Capital: Punakha	Widely recognized state.
Biu – Biu Kingdom; Capital: Biu	Widely recognized state.
Bohemia – Kingdom of Bohemia; Capital: Prague	Widely recognized state.
Bolivia – Bolivian Republic; Capital: Sucre (official), La Paz (administrative)	Widely recognized state.
Bora Bora – Kingdom of Bora Bora; Capital: Nunue, Vaitape	Widely recognized state.
Bornu – Bornu Empire; Capital: Ngazargamu	Widely recognized state.
Brakna – Brakna Emirate; Capital: Aleg	Widely recognized state.
→ Brazil – Empire of Brazil; Capital: Rio de Janeiro	Brazil was a federation of 20 states and one federal district. (Note: 20 States: Alagoas, Amazonas, Bahia, Ceará, Espírito Santo, Goiás, Maranhão, Mato Grosso, Minas Gerais, Pará, Paraíba, Paraná, Pernambuco, Piauí, Rio Grande do Norte, Rio Grande do Sul, Rio de Janeiro, Santa Catarina, São Paulo, Sergipe. 1 Federal District: Federal District.)
Bremen – Free Hanseatic City of Bremen; Capital: Bremen	Widely recognized state to 1 July 1867. Member of the German Confederation. State of the North German Confederation from 1 July 1867.
Brunei – Sultanate of Brunei; Capital: Kampong Ayer	Widely recognized state.
Brunswick – Duchy of Brunswick; Capital: Brunswick	Widely recognized state to 1 July 1867. Member of the German Confederation. State of the North German Confederation from 1 July 1867.
Buganda – Kingdom of Buganda; Capital: Mengo	Widely recognized state.
Bukhara – Emirate of Bukhara; Capital: Bukhara	Widely recognized state.
Bundu – State of Bundu (to 1858); Capital: Koussan	Widely recognized state to 1858.
Bunyoro – Bunyoro-Kitara Kingdom; Capital: Hoima	Widely recognized state.
Burma – Kingdom of Burma; Capital: Mandalay	Widely recognized state.
Burundi – Kingdom of Burundi; Capital: Gitega	Widely recognized state.
Busoga – Kingdom of Busoga; Capital: Bugembe	Widely recognized state.
=== C ===
Cambodia – Kingdom of Cambodia; Capital: Oudong	Widely recognized state.
Cayor – Kingdom of Cayor; Capital: Mboul	Widely recognized state.
Central Italy – United Provinces of Central Italy (from 8 December 1859); Capital: Modena	Widely recognized state from 8 December 1859. Client state of the Kingdom of Sardinia from 8 December 1859.
Cherokee Nation; Capital: Tahlequah	Widely recognized state to.
Chile – Republic of Chile; Capital: Santiago	Widely recognized state.
China – Great Qing Empire; Capital: Beijing	Widely recognized state. China had sovereignty over the following territories: Lanfang Republic (Vassal state); Tibet (Protectorate) including one protectorate: Sikkim (De jure protectorate)
Costa Rica – Republic of Costa Rica; Capital: San Jose	Widely recognized state.
Couto Misto; Capital: Santiago de Rubiás	De facto independent microstate.

=== D ===
- Dahomey – Kingdom of Dahomey
- Dar al Kuti – Sultanate of Dar Al Kuti
- Dendi – Dendi Kingdom
- Denmark – Kingdom of Denmark
- Dominican Republic – Dominican Republic

=== E ===
- Ecuador – Republic of Ecuador
- El Salvador – El Salvador
- Ethiopia – Ethiopian Empire

=== F ===
- Fiji – Tui Viti
- Finland – Grand Duchy of Finland
- France
  - French Republic (to December 2, 1852)
  - French Empire (from December 2, 1852)
- Frankfurt – Free City of Frankfurt
- Futa Jallon – Imamate of Futa Jallon
- Futa Toro – Imamate of Futa Toro

=== G ===
- Garhwal – Garhwal Kingdom
- Garo – Kingdom of Garo
- Gaza – Gaza Empire
- Gera – Kingdom of Gera
- Gomma – Kingdom of Gomma
- Granadine Confederation – Granadine Confederation (from May 22, 1858)
- Greece – Kingdom of Greece
- → → Guatemala – Republic of Guatemala
- Gumma – Kingdom of Gumma
- Gyaaman – State of Gyaaman

=== H ===
- Ha'il – Emirate of Ha'il
- → Haiti
  - Empire of Haiti (to January 15, 1859)
  - Republic of Haiti (from January 15, 1859)
- Hamburg – Free city of Hamburg
- Hanover – Kingdom of Hanover
- Hawaii – Kingdom of Hawaii
- Hesse-Darmstadt – Grand Duchy of Hesse and by Rhine
- Hesse-Homburg – Landgraviate of Hesse-Homburg
- Hesse-Kassel (or Hesse-Cassel) – Electorate of Hesse
- Hohenzollern-Hechingen – Principality of Hohenzollern-Hechingen (to April 8, 1850)
- Hohenzollern-Sigmaringen – Principality of Hohenzollern-Sigmaringen (to April 6, 1850)
- Holstein – Duchy of Holstein
- Honduras – Republic of Honduras
- Huahine – Kingdom of Huahine
- Hungary – Kingdom of Hungary
- Huraa – Huraa dynasty
- Hyderabad State (princely state of British India)

=== J ===
- Janjero – Kingdom of Janjero
- Japan – Tokugawa shogunate
- Jimma – Kingdom of Jimma
- Johor – Johor Sultanate
- Jolof – Jolof Kingdom

=== K ===
- Kaabu – Kingdom of Kaabu
- Kabul – Emirate of Kabul (to 1855)
- Kabulistan – Kingdom of Kabul (from 1858)
- Kaffa – Kingdom of Kaffa
- Kathiri – Kathiri Sultanate of Seiyun in Hadramaut
- Kénédougou – Kénédougou Kingdom
- Khasso – Kingdom of Khasso
- Khiva – Khanate of Khiva
- Kokand – Khanate of Kokand
- Kong – Kong Empire
- Kongo – Kingdom of Kongo
- → Korea – Kingdom of Great Joseon
- Koya Temne – Kingdom of Koya

=== L ===
- Liberia – Republic of Liberia
- → Liechtenstein – Principality of Liechtenstein
- Limburg – Duchy of Limburg
- Limmu-Ennarea – Kingdom of Limmu-Ennarea
- Lippe – Principality of Lippe-Detmoldt
- Loango – Kingdom of Loango
- Lombardy–Venetia – Kingdom of Lombardy–Venetia
- Luba – Luba Empire
- Lubeck – Free City of Lubeck
- Lunda – Lunda Empire
- Luxembourg – Grand Duchy of Luxembourg

=== M ===
- Maldives – Sultanate of Maldives
- Mangareva – Kingdom of Mangareva
- Manipur – Kingdom of Manipur
- Maryland – State of Maryland in Africa (from 29 May 1854 to 18 March 1857)
- Massina – Massina Empire
- Matabeleland – Matabele Kingdom
- Mecklenburg-Schwerin – Grand Duchy of Mecklenburg-Schwerin
- Mecklenburg-Strelitz – Grand Duchy of Mecklenburg-Strelitz
- Mexico – Republic of Mexico
- Mindanao – Sultanate of Maguindanao
- Modena – Duchies of Modena and Reggio
- Moldavia - Principality of Moldavia
- Monaco – Principality of Monaco
- → Montenegro
  - Prince-Bishopric of Montenegro (to March 13, 1852)
  - Principality of Montenegro (from March 13, 1852)
- Morocco – Sultanate of Morocco
- Muscat and Oman – Sultanate of Muscat and Oman (from 1856)

=== N ===
- Najran – Principality of Najran
- Nassau – Duchy of Nassau
- Negeri Sembilan – Negeri Sembilan
- Nejd – Emirate of Nejd
- Nepal - Kingdom of Nepal
- Netherlands – Kingdom of the Netherlands
- New Granada – Republic of New Granada (renamed Granadine Confederation on May 22, 1858)
- → → Nicaragua – Republic of Nicaragua

Norway → Sweden and Norway

- Nri – Kingdom of Nri

=== O ===
- Oldenburg – Grand Duchy of Oldenburg
- Orange Free State – Republic of Orange Free State (from February 17, 1854)
- Ottoman Empire – Sublime Ottoman State
- Ouaddai – Ouaddai Empire
- Oyo – Oyo Empire

=== P ===
- Pahang – Sultanate of Pahang
- Papal States – States of the Church
- Paraguay – Republic of Paraguay
- Parma – Duchy of Parma, Piacenza and Guastalla (to December 8, 1859)
- Perak – Sultanate of Perak
- Persia – Sublime State of Persia
- Peru – Peruvian Republic
- Portugal – Kingdom of Portugal
- Prussia – Kingdom of Prussia

=== Q ===
- Qu'aiti – Qu'aiti Sultanate of Shihr and Muqalla in Hadramaut

=== R ===
- Raiatea – Kingdom of Raiatea
- Rapa Nui – Kingdom of Rapa Nui
- Rarotonga – Kingdom of Rarotonga (from 1858)
- Reuss Elder Line – Principality of Reuss Elder Line
- Reuss Junior Line – Principality of Reuss Junior Line
- → Russia – Russian Empire
- Rwanda – Kingdom of Rwanda
- Ryūkyū Kingdom – Kingdom of Ryūkyū

=== S ===
- Samoa – Kingdom of Samoa
- San Marino – Most Serene Republic of San Marino
- Sarawak – Kingdom of Sarawak
- Sardinia – Kingdom of Sardinia
- Saxe-Altenburg – Duchy of Saxe-Altenburg
- Saxe-Coburg-Gotha – Duchy of Saxe-Coburg and Gotha
- Saxe-Meiningen – Duchy of Saxe-Meiningen
- Saxe-Weimar-Eisenach – Grand Duchy of Saxe-Weimar-Eisenach
- Saxony – Kingdom of Saxony
- Schaumburg-Lippe – Principality of Schaumburg-Lippe
- Schleswig – Duchy of Schleswig
- Schwarzburg-Rudolstadt – Principality of Schwarzburg-Rudolstadt
- Schwarzburg-Sondershausen – Principality of Schwarzburg-Sondershausen
- Selangor – Sultanate of Selangor
- Serbia – Principality of Serbia
- Siak Sri Indrapura – Sultanate of Siak Sri Indrapura (to 1858)
- (Thailand) Siam – Kingdom of Siam
- Sikkim – Chogyalate of Sikkim
- Sokoto – Sokoto Caliphate

South African Republic → Transvaal

- Spain – Kingdom of Spain
- Sulu – Sultanate of Sulu

Sweden → Sweden and Norway

- Sweden and Norway – United Kingdoms of Sweden and Norway
- Switzerland – Swiss Confederation

=== T ===
- Tahiti – Kingdom of Tahiti
- Tonga – Tu'i Tonga
- Toro – Toro Kingdom
- Toucouleur – Toucouleur Empire
- Transvaal – South African Republic (from June 27, 1856)
- Tuscany – Grand Duchy of Tuscany
- Two Sicilies – Kingdom of the Two Sicilies

=== U ===
- United Kingdom – United Kingdom of Great Britain and Ireland
- → United States – United States of America
- United States of the Ionian Islands – United States of the Ionian Islands
- Uruguay – Eastern Republic of Uruguay

=== V ===
- → → Venezuela
  - State of Venezuela (to 1856)
  - Republic of Venezuela (from 1856)

=== W ===
- Wajoq – Kingdom of Wajoq
- Waldeck-Pyrmont – Principality of Waldeck and Pyrmont
- Welayta – Kingdom of Welayta
- Württemberg – Kingdom of Württemberg

=== Y ===
- Yeke – Yeke Kingdom (from 1856)

=== Z ===
- Zululand – Kingdom of Zululand

== Non-sovereign territories ==
=== Oldenburg ===
- Lordship of In- and Kniphausen, protectorate of Oldenburg to 1854.

=== United Kingdom ===
- Cape Colony – Cape of Good Hope

== States claiming sovereignty ==
- Aceh – Sultanate of Aceh
- Germany – German Empire (to November 29, 1850)
- Goust – Republic of Goust
- State of Buenos Aires (from September 11, 1852)
- Taiping Heavenly Kingdom - Heavenly Kingdom of Great Peace (from January 11, 1851)
- Tavolara – Kingdom of Tavolara

Political entities in the 19th century
Preceded by 1840s	Political entities in the 1850s	Succeeded by 1860s
