= Joseph Karakitie Azigbo =

Nigerian business magnate

Joseph Karakitie Azigbo (1918–1986) was a Nigerian business magnate and notable figure within the Okpe Kingdom of Nigeria. In the early 1950s, Azigbo achieved substantial success as an industrial entrepreneur-a position that made him attain a level of affluence within Nigeria. However, his life was marked by the Nigerian Civil War, during which a considerable portion of his assets were either confiscated or damaged by the Nigerian army.

== Early life and career in business ==
Azigbo was born in Orerokpe on December 29, 1918. He worked with the United African Company (UAC) in Jos before establishing his mining business (Azigbo Brothers Limited). He soon became very successful in the mining field and became one of the richest men in Nigeria in the 1950s. He was the biggest miner of tin and columbite in all of West Africa, owning over 150 mining sites. At the outbreak of the Nigerian Civil War in 1967, he moved part of his business from Jos, Plateau State, to Sapele, in the Niger Delta. There he established a palm produce export business and also built a sawmill factory on the exclusive Elder Dempster Embankment by the River Ethiope.

== Seizure of property by the Nigerian army ==
After the war, on his return to Jos, most of Azigbo's properties had either been vandalized or commandeered by the Nigerian army; others had been occupied by locals who laid claims to them. Among these was his private residence in Anglo Jos, a part of which was turned into the Nigerian Air Force office at the junction of Bukuru road and Miango road. His attempts to regain possession of his properties from the Nigerian government dragged on for decades, which was a huge financial blow from which chief J.K. (as he was referred to) never recovered. He had spent most of his early adult life working and investing heavily in Jos, assuming that after the war, it would be business as usual.

== Return to Niger Delta ==
In the face of these setbacks, Azigbo left his eldest son, Raymond, in charge of the mining business in Jos and returned to the Niger Delta, which turned out to be one of the worst decisions he ever made. Raymond was a pampered child, and his father ensured that he had the best in life. Raymond had never worked even for a day and lived a sheltered life and being put in charge of Azigbo Brothers Limited brought out the worst in him. There is a saying that money brings out the worst in some people; in the case of Raymond, power and money sent him on a destructive course—he started selling off properties and company vehicles.

By the time the word got to the Azigbo, a lot of financial damage had been done. He quickly issued a disclaimer in most of the newspapers in northern Nigeria, including The Nigerian Standard in Jos, against Raymond Azigbo. Azigbo now had a new enemy; it was neither the Nigerian government nor the locals in Jos, this was an enemy from within. Azigbo still lived a wealthy life with servants and stewards, some of whom migrated with the family from Jos, but he was now a shadow of his former self. He was no longer ranked as one of the richest men in the country. Gone were the days when he would be met by the governor of Plateau State at the airport on his return from trips abroad.

== Death ==
He died on 11 July 11, 1986, at the age of 68. He was survived by 18 children, amongst whom is Edesiri Azigbo (former Member of the Federal House of Representatives).
