= List of political entities in the 19th century =

This is a list of political entities in the 19th century AD (i.e. 1801–1900). It includes both sovereign states, self-declared unrecognized states, and any political predecessors of current sovereign states.

== Political entities ==
| Flag | Name | Capital(s) | Type | Existed | Region | Today part of |
|---|---|---|---|---|---|---|
| | Kingdom of Bailundo | | Kingdom | 1700–1904 | Africa: Central | Angola |
| | Portuguese Angola | Luanda | Colony of Portugal | 1575–1975 | Africa: Central | Angola |
| Kingdom of Kongo according to Giovanni Cavazzi da Montecuccolo | Kingdom of Kongo | São Salvador | Kingdom/client | 1390–1914 | Africa: Central | Angola |
| | Kakonda | | Kingdom | 1720–present | Africa: Central | Angola |
| | Kasanje Kingdom | Not specified | Kingdom | 1620–1910 | Africa: Central | Angola |
| | Kingdom of Matamba | | Kingdom | 1631–1810 | Africa: Central | Angola |
| | Mbunda Kingdom | Lumbala N'guimbo | Kingdom | 1500–1917 | Africa: Central | Angola |
| | Mbwila | | Vassal state | 1550–1820 | Africa: Central | Angola |
| | Kingdom of Ndongo | | Kingdom | 1515–1909 | Africa: Central | Angola |
| | Oukwanyama | | Kingdom | 1600–present | Africa: Central | Angola |
| | Viye | | Kingdom | 1700s–present | Africa: Central | Angola |
| | Bandjoun | | Kingdom | 1552–present | Africa: Central | Cameroon |
| | Duala Kingdom | | Kingdom | 16th century-present | Africa: Central | Cameroon |
| | Kingdom of Bamum | | Kingdom | 1394–1923 | Africa: Central | Cameroon |
| | Bangassou Sultanate | | Sultanate | 18th century–present | Africa: Central | Cameroon |
| | Kotoko kingdom | | Kingdom | | Africa: Central | Cameroon |
| | Mandara Kingdom | | Kingdom | 1500–present | Africa: Central | Cameroon |
| | Mankon | | Kingdom | 1187–present | Africa: Central | Cameroon |
| | Ngoyo | | Kingdom | 15th century–1885 | Africa: Central | Cameroon |
| Deutsch-Kamerun | Kamerun | Yaoundé | Colony of Germany | 1884–1916 | Africa: Central | Cameroon |
| | Dar al Kuti | | Sultanate | 1830–1911 | Africa: Central | Central African Republic |
| | Rabih's Empire | | Empire | 1894–1900 | Africa: Central | Chad |
| | Sultanate of Bagirmi | Massenya, Chekna | Sultanate | 1522–1897 | Africa: Central | Chad |
| France | French Chad | Fort Lamy | Colony of France | 1900–1960 | Africa: Central | Chad |
| | Wadai Empire | Abéché | Empire | 1635–1908 | Africa: Central | Chad |
| | Comancheria | | Empire | c. 18th century – 1860s | Americas: North America | United States |
| | Congo Free State | Boma | Kingdom | 1885–1908 | Africa: Central | Democratic Republic of the Congo |
| | Kuba Kingdom | Not specified | Kingdom | c.1600–19th century | Africa: Central | Democratic Republic of the Congo |
| | Kakongo | Kinguele | Kingdom | 15th century–1885 | Africa: Central | Democratic Republic of the Congo |
| | Kingdom of Luba | Mwibele | Kingdom | 1585–1889 | Africa: Central | Democratic Republic of the Congo |
| | Kingdom of Lunda | Not specified | Kingdom | c.1665–1887 | Africa: Central | Democratic Republic of the Congo |
| | Mwene Muji | Mushie | Kingdom | 1400–1900 | Africa: Central | Democratic Republic of the Congo |
| | Nsonso Kingdom | | Kingdom | 16th–19th century | Africa: Central | Democratic Republic of Congo |
| | Yeke Kingdom | Bunkeya | Kingdom | 1856–1891 | Africa: Central | Democratic Republic of the Congo |
| | Kingdom of Orungu | | Kingdom | c.1700–1927 | Africa: Central | Gabon |
| | Anziku Kingdom | | Kingdom | 17th century–1875 | Africa: Central | Republic of the Congo |
| France | French Congo | | Colony of France | 1882–1910 | Africa: Central | Republic of the Congo |
| | Kingdom of Loango | | Kingdom | c.1550–c.1883 | Africa: Central | Republic of the Congo |
| | Portuguese São Tomé and Príncipe | | Colony of Portugal | 1470–1975 | Africa: Central | São Tomé and Príncipe |
| | Kazembe chiefdom | | Chiefdom | 1740–1904 | Africa: Central | Zambia |
| | Sultans of the Comoros | | Sultanate | 15th century–c.1912 | Africa: East | Comoros |
| | Merina Kingdom | Antananarivo | Kingdom | 1540–1897 | Africa: East | Madagascar |
| | Boina Kingdom | Boina bay | Kingdom | 1690–1840 | Africa: East | Madagascar |
| | Guingemaro | ? | Kingdom | 1600–1900 | Africa: East | Madagascar |
| | Medri Bahri | Debarwa | Kingdom | 1137–1890 | Africa: East, Horn | Eritrea |
| | Sultanate of Aussa | Asaita | Sultanate | 1734–1902 | Africa: East, Horn | Ethiopia |
| | Ethiopian Empire | Addis Ababa | Empire | 1137–1935; 1942–1974 | Africa: East, Horn | Ethiopia |
| | Kingdom of Garo | | Kingdom | 1567–1883 | Africa: East, Horn | Ethiopia |
| | Kingdom of Gera | | Kingdom | 1835–1887 | Africa: East, Horn | Ethiopia |
| | Kingdom of Gomma | | Kingdom | c.1780–1886 | Africa: East, Horn | Ethiopia |
| | Kingdom of Gumma | | Kingdom | c.1770–1902 | Africa: East, Horn | Ethiopia |
| | Hadiya | Ge | Governor | 14th century–1850 | Africa: East, Horn | Ethiopia |
| | Emirate of Harar | Ge | Emirate | 1647–1887 | Africa: East, Horn | Ethiopia |
| | Kingdom of Janjero | | Kingdom | 15th century–1894 | Africa: East, Horn | Ethiopia |
| | Kingdom of Jimma | | Kingdom | 1790–1932 | Africa: East, Horn | Ethiopia |
| | Kingdom of Kaffa | | Kingdom | c.1390–1897 | Africa: East, Horn | Ethiopia |
| | Kingdom of Limmu-Ennarea | | Kingdom | 1801–1891 | Africa: East, Horn | Ethiopia |
| | Kingdom of Welayta | | Kingdom | c.1250–1894 | Africa: East, Horn | Ethiopia |
| | Kingdom of Yamma | | Kingdom | 15th century–1894 | Africa: East, Horn | Ethiopia |
| | British Somaliland | Hargeisa | Colony, British | 1884–1940; 1941–1960 | Africa: East, Horn | Somaliland |
| | Gadabuursi Ughazate | | Sultanate | 1575/1607–1884 | Africa: East, Horn | Somalia |
| | Sultanate of the Geledi | | Sultanate | Late 17th century–1911 | Africa: East, Horn | Somalia |
| | Habr Yunis Sultanate | | Kingdom | 1769–1907 | Africa: East, Horn | Somalia |
| | Hiraab Imamate | | Kingdom | Early 17th century–1889 | Africa: East, Horn | Somalia |
| | Sultanate of Hobyo | | Sultanate | 1878–1926 | Africa: East, Horn | Somalia |
| | Majeerteen Sultanate | | Sultanate | c.1600–1924 | Africa: East, Horn | Somalia |
| | Isaaq Sultanate | Hargeisa | Sultanate | ~1750s–1884 | Africa: East, Horn | Somaliland |
| | Kingdom of Burundi | | Kingdom | 1680–1966 | Africa: East, Lakes | Burundi |
| | Wanga Kingdom | | | 16th century–1926 | Africa: East, Lakes | Kenya |
| | Wituland | | | 1858–1885 | Africa: East, Lakes | Kenya |
| | Bukunzi | | Kingdom | 1730–1925 | Africa: East, Lakes | Tanzania |
| | Kingdom of Rwanda | | Kingdom | 11th century–1962 | Africa: East, Lakes | Rwanda |
| | Shilluk Kingdom | Fashoda | Kingdom | c.1490–1865 | Africa: East, Lakes | South Sudan |
| | Chagga states | | Kingdom | 1600–1963 | Africa: East, Lakes | Tanzania |
| | Kingdom of Karagwe | | Kingdom | 1450–1963 | Africa: East, Lakes | Tanzania |
| | Kilindi dynasty | | Kingdom | 1730–2000 | Africa: East, Lakes | Tanzania |
| | Ugweno | | Kingdom | 14th–19th century | Africa: East, Lakes | Tanzania |
| | Sultanate of Zanzibar | | Sultanate | 1856–1964 | Africa: East, Lakes | Tanzania |
| | Ankole | | Kingdom | late 15th century–1967 | Africa: East, Lakes | Uganda |
| | Buganda | Kampala | Kingdom | early 14th century–1967 | Africa: East, Lakes | Uganda |
| Bunyoro, Uganda | Bunyoro | | Kingdom | 16th century–1967 | Africa: East, Lakes | Uganda |
| | Empire of Kitara | | Kingdom | 1300–1500 | Africa: East, Lakes | Uganda |
| | Kooki | | Kingdom | late 1740–1896 | Africa: East, Lakes | Uganda |
| | Khedivate of Egypt | | Khedivate | 1867–1914 | Africa: Northeast | Egypt |
| | Funj Sultanate | | Sultanate | 1504–1821 | Africa: Northeast | Sudan |
| | Mahdist State | | Islamic state | 1885–1889 | Africa: Northeast | Sudan |
| | Anglo-Egyptian Sudan | | Colony, British/Egyptian | 1899–1956 | Africa: Northeast | Sudan |
| | Sultanate of Darfur | | Sultanate | 1603–1874; 1898–1916 | Africa: Northeast | Sudan |
| | Taqali | | Kingdom | 1750–1969 | Africa: Northeast | Sudan |
| | Emirate of Abdelkader | Emirate | | 1832–1837 | Africa: Northwest | Algeria |
| | Kingdom of Beni Abbas | Kingdom | | 1510–1872 | Africa: Northwest | Algeria |
| France | French Algeria | | Colony, French | 1830–1962 | Africa: Northwest | Algeria |
| | Regency of Algiers | Algiers | De-facto independent Stratocracy | 1516–1830 | Africa: Northwest | Algeria |
| | Sultanate of Tuggurt | Sultanate | | 1516–1830 | Africa: Northwest | Algeria |
| | Fezzan Sultanate | Sultanate | | 1550–1812 | Africa: Northwest | Libya |
| | Sultanate of Morocco | Fes | Sultanate | 1668–1912 | Africa: Northwest | Morocco |
| Spain | Spanish Sahara | | Territory, Spanish | 1884–1975 | Africa: Northwest | Western Sahara |
| United Kingdom | Bechuanaland Protectorate | | Protectorate | 1885–1966 | Africa: South | Botswana |
| | Malete Kingdom | | Protectorate | 1780–present | Africa: South | Botswana |
| | Basutoland | | | 1884–1966 | Africa: South | Lesotho |
| | Maravi | | | Late 15th century–1870 | Africa: South | Malawi |
| | Gaza Empire | | Empire | 1824–1895 | Africa: South | Mozambique |
| | Portuguese Mozambique | | Colony, Portuguese | 1498–1975 | Africa: South | Mozambique |
| | Angoche Sultanate | Angoche, Moma | Sultanate | 1485–1910 | Africa: South | Mozambique |
| | German South West Africa | | Colony, German | 1884–1915 | Africa: South | Namibia |
| | Odonga Kingdom | | Kingdom | 1650–present | Africa: South | Namibia |
| Dutch East India Company | Kaapstad | | Colony, Dutch | | Africa: South | South Africa |
| | Hlubi kingdom | | Kingdom | 1300–present | Africa: South | South Africa |
| | Mthethwa Paramountcy | | Empire | c.1780–1817 | Africa: South | South Africa |
| | Ndwandwe | | Empire | c.1780–1825 | Africa: South | South Africa |
| Natal Colony | Colony of Natal | | Colony, British | 1843–1910 | Africa: South | South Africa |
| | Nieuwe Republiek | | Republiek | 1884–1888 | Africa: South | South Africa |
| → | Cape Colony | Cape Town | Colony, British | 1795–1910 | Africa: South | South Africa |
| | Orange Free State | | | 1854–1902 | Africa: South | South Africa |
| → → | South African Republic | | Republic | 1856–1877; 1881–1902; 1914–1915 | Africa: South | South Africa |
| | Transvaal Colony | | Colony, British | 1877–1881; 1902–1910 | Africa: South | South Africa |
| | Xhosa Kingdom | | Kingdom | 14th century–1890 | Africa: South | South Africa |
| | Zulu Kingdom | | Kingdom | 1816–1897 | Africa: South | South Africa |
| Swaziland | Kingdom of Eswatini | | | 1745–1906; 1968–present | Africa: South | Swaziland |
| | Barotseland | | | 17th century–1900 | Africa: South | Zambia |
| | Maungwe | | | 1635–1896 | Africa: South | Zimbabwe |
| | Mthwakazi | | | 1830s–1889 | Africa: South | Zimbabwe |
| | Rozvi Empire | | Empire | 1660–1866 | Africa: South | Zimbabwe |
| | Company rule in Rhodesia by the British South Africa Company | | Company rule | 1890–1924 | Africa: South | Zimbabwe |
| | Dahomey | | Kingdom | c.1600–1904 | Africa: West | Benin |
| | Savalou | | Kingdom | 1557–1894 | Africa: West | Benin |
| | Kingdom of Whydah | | Kingdom | 1580–1817 | Africa: West | Benin |
| | Mossi Kingdoms | | Kingdoms | 11th century–1896 | Africa: West | Burkina Faso |
| | Gwiriko | | Kingdoms | 1714–1897 | Africa: West | Burkina Faso |
| | Portuguese Cape Verde | | Colony, Portuguese | 1462–1975 | Africa: West | Cape Verde |
| | Bornu Empire (Kanem–Bornu) | Ngazargamu | Empire | 1380–1893 | Africa: West | Chad |
| | Gambia Colony and Protectorate | | Colony, British | 1821–1965 | Africa: West | Gambia |
| | Kombo | | Kingdom | 1281–1875 | Africa: West | Gambia |
| | Niumi | | Kingdom | 1680–1897 | Africa: West | Gambia |
| | Ahanta kingdom | | | 1350–1838 | Africa: West | Ghana |
| | Akropong | | Kingdom | 1733–1880 | Africa: West | Ghana |
| | Akyem-Abuakwa | | Kingdom | 1500–present | Africa: West | Ghana |
| | Akyem Kotoku | | Kingdom | 1400–present | Africa: West | Ghana |
| | Anlo | | Kingdom | 1468–presenr | Africa: West | Ghana |
| | Aowin | | Kingdom | 1500–1840 | Africa: West | Ghana |
| | Asebu | | Kingdom | 1500–1820 | Africa: West | Ghana |
| | Kingdom of Ashanti | | Empire | 1670–1902; 1935–1957 | Africa: West | Ghana |
| | Kingdom of Dagbon | | Kingdom | 15th century–presenr | Africa: West | Ghana |
| | Nkran kingdom | | | 1510–present | Africa: West | Ghana |
| | Gyaaman | | | 1450–1895 | Africa: West | Ghana |
| | Fante Confederacy | | Confederation | 1868–1874 | Africa: West | Ghana |
| | Mankessim Kingdom | | Kingdom | 1252–1844 | Africa: West | Ghana |
| | Kingdom of Wala | | Kingdom | 1317–1894 | Africa: West | Ghana |
| | Zabarma Emirate | | Emirate | 1860–1897 | Africa: West | Ghana |
| | Portuguese Guinea | | Colony, Portuguese | 1474–1974 | Africa: West | Guinea |
| | Imamate of Futa Jallon | | Imamate | 1725–1896 | Africa: West | Guinea |
| | Wassoulou Empire | | Empire | 1878–1898 | Africa: West | Guinea |
| | Baté Empire | | Empire | until 1879 | Africa: West | Guinea |
| | Assinie-Mafia | | Kingdom | 1600–1907 | Africa: West | Ivory Coast |
| | Kabadougou Kingdom | | Kingdom | 1848–1980 | Africa: West | Ivory Coast |
| | Kong Empire | | Empire | 1710–1898 | Africa: West | Ivory Coast |
| | Kingdom of Sanwi | | Kingdom | 1740–present | Africa: West | Ivory Coast |
| | Republic of Maryland | | Republic | 1854–1857 | Africa: West | Liberia |
| | Liberia | | Republic | 1847–present | Africa: West | Liberia |
| | Kingdom of Diarra | | Kingdom | 1076–1860 | Africa: West | Mali |
| | Gajaaga | | Kingdom | 950–1850 | Africa: West | Mali |
| | Kaabu | | Kingdom | 1537–1867 | Africa: West | Mali |
| | Kénédougou Kingdom | | Kingdom | c.1650–1898 | Africa: West | Mali |
| | Khasso | | Kingdom | 17th century–1880 | Africa: West | Mali |
| | Bamana Empire | | Empire | 1712–1861 | Africa: West | Mali |
| | Kaarta | | | 1753–1890 | Africa: West | Mali |
| | Pashalik of Timbuktu | | | 1591–1833 | Africa: West | Mali |
| | Toucouleur Empire | | Empire | 1848–1893 | Africa: West | Mali |
| | Massina Empire | | Empire | c.1818–1862 | Africa: West | Mali |
| | Emirate of Trarza | | Emirate | 1480–present | Africa: West | Mauritania |
| | Sultanate of Damagaram | | Sultanate | 1731–1851 | Africa: West | Niger |
| | Dendi Kingdom: Askiya dynasty | | Kingdom | 1591–1901 | Africa: West | Niger |
| | Dosso Kingdom | | Kingdom | 1750–present | Africa: West | Niger |
| | Emirate of Say | | Emirate | 1825–1894 | Africa: West | Niger |
| | Téra | | Kingdom | 1600–1885 | Africa: West | Niger |
| | Agbon Kingdom | | Kingdom | 1400–present | Africa: West | Nigeria |
| | Akure Kingdom | | Kingdom | 1150–present | Africa: West | Nigeria |
| | Akwamu | | Kingdom | 1505–present | Africa: West | Nigeria |
| | Atakpa | | Kingdom | 1786–present | Africa: West | Nigeria |
| | Aro Confederacy | | Confederation | 1690–1902 | Africa: West | Nigeria |
| | Kingdom of Bonny | | Kingdom | 1759–present | Africa: West | Nigeria |
| | Bono state | | Kingdom | 11th–20th century | Africa: West | Nigeria |
| | Dassa | | Kingdom | 1660–present | Africa: West | Nigeria |
| | Edem | | Kingdom | 1200–1893 | Africa: West | Nigeria |
| | Egbaland Kingdom | | Kingdom | 17th century–present | Africa: West | Nigeria |
| | Eko Kingdom | | Kingdom | 1716–present | Africa: West | Nigeria |
| | Idoani Confederacy | | Kingdom | 1860–present | Africa: West | Nigeria |
| | Igala Kingdom | | Kingdom | 1507–present | Africa: West | Nigeria |
| | Ijebu Kingdom | | Kingdom | 1400–present | Africa: West | Nigeria |
| | Isinkan | | Kingdom | 1150–present | Africa: West | Nigeria |
| | Iwo Kingdom | | Kingdom | 1415–present | Africa: West | Nigeria |
| | Kalabari Kingdom | | Kingdom | 1550–1900 | Africa: West | Nigeria |
| | Ketu | | Kingdom | 1795–present | Africa: West | Nigeria |
| | Kano Emirate | | Emirate | 1807–1903 | Africa: West | Nigeria |
| | Mbot Abasi Kingdom | | Kingdom | 1630–1914 | Africa: West | Nigeria |
| | Ibadan | Ibadan | Kingdom | 1829–1893 | Africa: West | Nigeria |
| | Nnewi | | Kingdom | 1786–present | Africa: West | Nigeria |
| | Kingdom of Nri | Igbo-Ukwu | Kingdom | 948–1911 | Africa: West | Nigeria |
| | Kwararafa | | Kingdom | 1550–1840 | Africa: West | Nigeria |
| | Nembe Kingdom | | Kingdom | 1745–present | Africa: West | Nigeria |
| | Ondo Kingdom | | Kingdom | 1510–present | Africa: West | Nigeria |
| | Sabe | | Kingdom | 1738–present | Africa: West | Nigeria |
| | Sokoto Caliphate | | Caliphate | 1804–1903 | Africa: West | Nigeria |
| | Okpe | | Kingdom | 17th century–present | Africa: West | Nigeria |
| | Oyo Empire | Oyo-Ile | Kingdom | c.1400–1896 | Africa: West | Nigeria |
| | Kingdom of Benin | Benin City | Empire | 1180–1897 | Africa: West | Nigeria |
| | Sakur Kingdom | | Kingdom | 16th century–1922 | Africa: West | Nigeria |
| | Ughelli | | Kingdom | 1440–present | Africa: West | Nigeria |
| | Kingdom of Warri | | Kingdom | 1480–present | Africa: West | Nigeria |
| | Wukari Federation | | Kingdom | 1833–present | Africa: West | Nigeria |
| | French West Africa | | Colony, French | 1895–1958 | Africa: West | Senegal |
| | Cayor | | Kingdom | 1549–1879 | Africa: West | Senegal |
| | Fuladu | | Kingdom | 1867–1903 | Africa: West | Senegal |
| | Imamate of Futa Toro | | Imamate | 1776–1861 | Africa: West | Senegal |
| | Kingdom of Jolof | | Kingdom | 1549–1875 | Africa: West | Senegal |
| | Kasa kingdom | | | 15th century–1830 | Africa: West | Senegal |
| | Bundu | | | 17th century–1858 | Africa: West | Senegal |
| | Kingdom of Niani | | Kingdom | 14th century–1888 | Africa: West | Senegal |
| | Saloum | | Kingdom | 1494–1969 | Africa: West | Senegal |
| | Kingdom of Sine | | Kingdom | 1350–1969 | Africa: West | Senegal |
| | Baol | | Kingdom | 1555–1874 | Africa: West | Senegal |
| | Waalo | | Kingdom | 1287–1855 | Africa: West | Senegal |
| | Kingdom of Koya | | Kingdom | 1505–1896 | Africa: West | Sierra Leone |
| | Sierra Leone Colony and Protectorate | | Colony, British | 1800–1961 | Africa: West | Sierra Leone |
| | Notsé | | Kingdom | 1600–1884 | Africa: West | Togo |
| | German Togoland | | Colony, German | 1884–1916 | Africa: West | Togo |
| | Colonial Antigua | | Colony, British | 1632–1981 | Americas: Caribbean | Antigua |
| | Colony of the Bahamas | | Colony, British | 1648–1973 | Americas: Caribbean | Bahamas |
| | Colonial Barbados | | | 1627–1958; 1962–1966 | Americas: Caribbean | Barbados |
| | Captaincy General of Cuba | | Territory, Spanish | 1607–1898 | Americas: Caribbean | Cuba |
| | Colonial Dominica | | Colony, British | 1715–1978 | Americas: Caribbean | Dominica |
| | Dominican Republic | | Republic | 1844–1861; 1865–present | Americas: Caribbean | Dominican |
| | Colonial Saint Vincent and the Grenadines | | Colony, British | 1763–1979 | Americas: Caribbean | Grenadines |
| | First Empire of Haiti | | Empire | 1804–1806 | Americas: Caribbean | Haiti |
| | Haiti | | | 1859–present | Americas: Caribbean | Haiti |
| Haiti 1806 | Kingdom of Haiti | | Kingdom | 1811–1820 | Americas: Caribbean | Haiti |
| Haiti 1806 | State of Haiti | | | 1806–1811 | Americas: Caribbean | Haiti |
| | Saint-Domingue | | Colony, French | 1625–1804 | Americas: Caribbean | Haiti |
| | Colonial Saint Lucia | | Colony, British | 1762–1979 | Americas: Caribbean | Saint Lucia |
| | Colonial Trinidad and Tobago | | Colony, British | 1889–1962 | Americas: Caribbean | Trinidad and Tobago |
| | British Honduras | | Colony, British | 1862–1981 | Americas: Central | Belize |
| | Costa Rica | | | 1823–present | Americas: Central | Costa Rica |
| | El Salvador | | | 1841–present | Americas: Central | El Salvador |
| | United Provinces of Central America | | Republic | 1823–1838 | Americas: Central | Guatemala |
| | Federal Republic of Central America | | Republic | 1823–1838 | Americas: Central | Guatemala |
| | Captaincy General of Guatemala | | Territory, Spanish | 1609–1821 | Americas: Central | Guatemala |
| | Guatemala | | | 1823–present | Americas: Central | Guatemala |
| State of Los Altos | Los Altos (state) | | | 1838–1840; 1848–1849 | Americas: Central | Guatemala |
| | Greater Republic of Central America | | Republic | 1896–1898 | Americas: Central | Honduras |
| | Honduras | | | 1838–present | Americas: Central | Honduras |
| | Mosquito Coast | | | 1838–1894 | Americas: Central | Nicaragua |
| | Nicaragua | | | 1894–present | Americas: Central | Nicaragua |
| | Canada | | Kingdom | 1867–present | Americas: North | Canada |
| | Republic of Manitoba | | Republic | 1867–1870 | Americas: North | Canada |
| | Greenland | | Company rule | 1774–1908 | Americas: North | Greenland |
| | Chan Santa Cruz | | | c.1850–1901 | Americas: North | Mexico |
| | First Mexican Empire | | Empire | 1821–1823 | Americas: North | Mexico |
| | Mexico | | Republic | 1867–present | Americas: North | Mexico |
| | Republic of the Rio Grande | | Republic | 1840–1840 | Americas: North | Mexico |
| | Second Mexican Empire | | Empire | 1864–1867 | Americas: North | Mexico |
| | Republic of Sonora | | Republic | 1854–1854 | Americas: North | Mexico |
| | Republic of Yucatán | | Republic | 1823; 1841–1848 | Americas: North | Mexico |
| | California Republic | | Republic | 1846–1846 | Americas: North | United States |
| | Cherokee Nation | | | 1794–1907 | Americas: North | United States |
| → → → → → | Confederate States | Montgomery (1861); Richmond (1861–1865) | Confederation | 1861–1865 | Americas: North | United States |
| | Republic of Indian Stream | | Republic | 1832–1835 | Americas: North | United States |
| Creek Nation | State of Muskogee | | | 1799–1803 | Americas: North | United States |
| | Republic of Texas | | Republic | 1836–1846 | Americas: North | United States |
| → → → → → → → → → → → → → → → → → → → → → | United States | Washington (1801–1871); Washington, D.C. (1871–1900) | Republic | 1776–present | Americas: North | United States |
| | Republic of West Florida | | Republic | 1810–1810 | Americas: North | United States |
| | Kingdom of Araucanía and Patagonia | | Kingdom | 1860–1862 | Americas: South | Argentina |
| | Argentina | | | 1861–present | Americas: South | Argentina |
| Argentina | Buenos Aires | | | 1852–1861 | Americas: South | Argentina |
| | Argentine Confederation | | Confederation | 1831–1861 | Americas: South | Argentina |
| Argentina | United Provinces of the Río de la Plata | | | 1810–1831 | Americas: South | Argentina |
| | Viceroyalty of the Río de la Plata | | Territory, Spanish | 1776–1810 | Americas: South | Argentina |
| | Bolivia | | | 1839–present | Americas: South | Bolivia |
| | Republic of Acre | | Republic | 1899–1900; 1903 | Americas: South | Brazil |
| Brazil | First Brazilian Republic | | Republic | 1889–1930 | Americas: South | Brazil |
| | Portugal, Brazil and the Algarves | | Kingdom | 1815–1822/1825 | Americas: South | Brazil |
| | Captaincy General of Chile | | Territory, Spanish | 1541–1818 | Americas: South | Chile |
| | Chile | | Republic | 1818–present | Americas: South | Chile |
| | Republic of Colombia | | | 1886–present | Americas: South | Colombia |
| | United States of Colombia | | | 1863–1886 | Americas: South | Colombia |
| | Gran Colombia | | | 1821–1831 | Americas: South | Colombia |
| | Granadine Confederation | | Confederation | 1858–1863 | Americas: South | Colombia |
| | Republic of New Granada | | Republic | 1831–1858 | Americas: South | Colombia |
| | United Provinces of New Granada | | Republic | 1810–1816 | Americas: South | Colombia |
| | Viceroyalty of New Granada | | Territory, Spanish | 1717–1819 | Americas: South | Colombia |
| | Ecuador | | | 1830–present | Americas: South | Ecuador |
| | British Guiana | | Colony, British | 1814–1966 | Americas: South | Guyana |
| → | Paraguay | | | 1811–present | Americas: South | Paraguay |
| | Peru | | | 1839–present | Americas: South | Peru |
| | Viceroyalty of Peru | | Territory, Spanish | 1542–1824 | Americas: South | Peru |
| | Peru–Bolivian Confederation | | Confederation | 1836–1839 | Americas: South | Peru |
| | Dutch Surinam | | Colony, Dutch | 1667–1954 | Americas: South | Suriname |
| | Liga Federal | | Federation | 1815–1820 | Americas: South | Uruguay |
| | Uruguay | | | 1828–present | Americas: South | Uruguay |
| | United States of Venezuela | | | 1864–1953 | Americas: South | Venezuela |
| | Kazakh Khanate | | Khanate | 1456–1847 | Asia: Central | Kazakhstan |
| | Khanate of Kokand | | Khanate | 1709–1876 | Asia: Central | Uzbekistan |
| | Emirate of Bukhara | | Emirate | 1747–1826 | Asia: Central | Uzbekistan |
| | Khanate of Khiva | | Khanate | 1511–1920 | Asia: Central | Uzbekistan |
| → | Qing dynasty | Peking | Monarchy | 1644–1912 | Asia: East | China |
| | Republic of Formosa | | Republic | 1895 | Asia: East | Taiwan |
| | Taiping Heavenly Kingdom | | | 1851–1864 | Asia: East | China |
| | Republic of Ezo | | Republic | 1869 | Asia: East | Japan |
| | Empire of Japan | | Empire | 1868–1947 | Asia: East | Japan |
| (Ryukyu Kingdom) | Ryukyu Kingdom | | Kingdom | 1429–1879 | Asia: East | Japan |
| | Tokugawa shogunate | | Shogunate | 1600–1868 | Asia: East | Japan |
| → → → | Joseon | Hanseong | Kingdom | 1392–1897 | Asia: East | Korea |
| Korea | Korean Empire | Hanseong | Empire | 1897–1910 | Asia: East | Korea |
| | Kingdom of Chakla | | Kingdom | 1407–1950 | Asia: East | Tibet |
| | Kingdom of Derge | Dêgê | Kingdom | 15th century–1956 | Asia: East | Tibet |
| | Kingdom of Lingtsang | Ezhi | Kingdom | 11th century–1959 | Asia: East | Tibet |
| Kingdom of Powo | Kanam | | Empire | 1330–1928 | Asia: East | Tibet |
| | Emirate of Afghanistan: Barakzai dynasty | | Emirate | 1823–1926; 1929 | Asia: South | Afghanistan |
| | Durrani Empire | | Empire | 1747–1823; 1839–1842 | Asia: South | Afghanistan |
| | Theocratic Bhutan | | Kingdom | 1616–1907 | Asia: South | Bhutan |
| | Bhutan | | Kingdom | 1650–1905 | Asia: South | Bhutan |
| | Balochistan:Khanate of Kalat | Kalat | Kingdom | 1666–1736; 1758–1839; 1839–1947 | Asia: South | Pakistan, Iran |
| | British India | | Colony, British | 1858–1947 | Asia: South | India |
| | Company rule in India | | Company rule | 1757–1858 | Asia: South | India |
| | Kharan | | Princely state (subsidiary alliance) | 1697–1948 | Asia: South | Pakistan |
| | Las Bela | | Princely state (subsidiary alliance) | 1742–1948 | Asia: South | Pakistan |
| | Makran | | Princely state (subsidiary alliance) | 18th century–1948 | Asia: South | Pakistan |
| | Manipur | | Princely state (subsidiary alliance) | 1110–1949 | Asia: South | India |
| | Alirajpur State | | Princely state (subsidiary alliance) | 1437–1948 | Asia: South | India |
| | Alwar State | | Princely state (subsidiary alliance) | 1296–1949 | Asia: South | India |
| | Athgarh | | Princely state (subsidiary alliance) | 1178–1949 | Asia: South | India |
| | Bhoi dynasty | | | 1541–1957 | Asia: South | India |
| | Kingdom of Cochin | Various | Kingdom | 12th century–1947 | Asia: South | India |
| | Hyderabad State | | | 1803–1948 | Asia: South | India |
| India | Kashmir and Jammu | | Kingdom | 1846–1953 | Asia: South | India |
| | Ahom kingdom | | Kingdom | 1228–1826 | Asia: South | India |
| | Ajaigarh State | | | 1765–1949 | Asia: South | India |
| | Alipura State | | | 1757–1950 | Asia: South | India |
| | Raj Darbhanga | Darbhanga | Kingdom | 1557–1947 | Asia: South | India |
| | Garhwal Kingdom | Various | Kingdom | 888–1949 | Asia: South | India |
| | Jaisalmer State | Jaisalmer | Principality | 1156–1947 | Asia: South | India |
| | Mughal Empire | | Empire | 1526–1540; 1555–1857 | Asia: South | India |
| | Sirmoor State | Sirmür | Principality | 1095–1948 | Asia: South | India |
| | Maratha Empire | | Empire | 1674–1820 | Asia: South | India |
| | Kingdom of Mysore | Mysore, Srirangapatna | Kingdom | 1399–1947 | Asia: South | India |
| | Nayakas of Chitradurga | | | 1588–1779 | Asia: South | India |
| | Sikh Empire | | Empire | 1799–1849 | Asia: South | India |
| | Kingdom of Sikkim | | Kingdom | 1642–1975 | Asia: South | India |
| | Travancore | | | 1729–1949 | Asia: South | India |
| | Twipra Kingdom | | | 14th century–1949 | Asia: South | India |
| | Huraa dynasty | | Monarchy | 1757–1952; 1954–1968 | Asia: South | Maldives |
| Maldives until 1903 | Sultanate of the Maldives | | Sultanate | 1117–1952; 1954–1968 | Asia: South | Maldives |
| | Kingdom of Nepal | Kathmandu | Kingdom | 1768–2008 | Asia: South | Nepal |
| | British Ceylon | | Colony, British | 1815–1948 | Asia: South | Sri Lanka |
| | Bruneian Empire | Various | Empire | 7th century–1888 | Asia: Southeast | Brunei |
| | British rule in Burma | | Colony, British | 1824–1942; 1945–1948 | Asia: Southeast | Myanmar |
| | Portuguese Timor | | Colony, Portuguese | 1702–1975 | Asia: Southeast | East Timor |
| | Dutch East Indies | | Colony, Dutch | 1800–1942; 1945–1949 | Asia: Southeast | Indonesia |
| | Lanfang Republic | | Republic | 1777–1884 | Asia: Southeast | Indonesia |
| | Aceh Sultanate | | Sultanate | 1496–1903 | Asia: Southeast | Indonesia |
| | Asahan Sultanate | | Sultanate | 1630–1946 | Asia: Southeast | Indonesia |
| | Sultanate of Banjar | | Kingdom | 1526–1860 | Asia: Southeast | Indonesia |
| | Sultanate of Bacan | | Sultanate | 1332–1965 | Asia: Southeast | Indonesia |
| | Banten Sultanate | | Sultanate | 1527–1813 | Asia: Southeast | Indonesia |
| | Bima Sultanate | | Sultanate | 1640–1958 | Asia: Southeast | Indonesia |
| | Sultanate of Bulungan | | Sultanate | 1731–1964 | Asia: Southeast | Indonesia |
| | Sultanate of Buton | | Sultanate | 1332–1960 | Asia: Southeast | Indonesia |
| | Kingdom of Bolaang Mongondow | | Kingdom | 1670–c.1940 | Asia: Southeast | Indonesia |
| | Sultanate of Deli | | Sultanate | 1632–1946 | Asia: Southeast | Indonesia |
| | Sultanate of Gowa | | Sultanate | 14th century–1947 | Asia: Southeast | Indonesia |
| | Jambi Sultanate | | Sultanate | 1615–1904 | Asia: Southeast | Indonesia |
| | Sultanate of Langkat | | Sultanate | 1468–1947 | Asia: Southeast | Indonesia |
| | Luwu | | Kingdom | 10–14th century–19th century | Asia: Southeast | Indonesia |
| | Mempawah Kingdom | | Kingdom | 1740–1944 | Asia: Southeast | Indonesia |
| | Pagaruyung Kingdom | | Kingdom | 1347–1833 | Asia: Southeast | Indonesia |
| | Palembang Sultanate | | Sultanate | 1659–1823 | Asia: Southeast | Indonesia |
| | Sultanate of Serdang | | Kingdom | 1888–c.1890 | Asia: Southeast | Indonesia |
| | Sultanate of Siak Sri Indrapura | | Sultanate | 1722–1949 | Asia: Southeast | Indonesia |
| | Surakarta Sunanate | | Sultanate | 1745–present | Asia: Southeast | Indonesia |
| | Kingdom of Tallo | | Kingdom | 15th century–1856 | Asia: Southeast | Indonesia |
| | Sultanate of Ternate | | Kingdom | 1257/1486–1918 | Asia: Southeast | Indonesia |
| | Sultanate of Tidore | | Kingdom | 1081?/1450–1967 | Asia: Southeast | Indonesia |
| | Yogyakarta Sultanate | | Kingdom | 1755–present | Asia: Southeast | Indonesia |
| | Amanatun | | Principality | 1642–1962 | Asia: Southeast | Indonesia |
| | Amanuban | | Principality | 1613–1958 | Asia: Southeast | Indonesia |
| | Amarasi | | Principality | | Asia: Southeast | Indonesia |
| | Sonbai | | Principality | 17th century–1950s | Asia: Southeast | Indonesia |
| | Sonbai Besar | | Principality | 1658–1906 | Asia: Southeast | Indonesia |
| | Sonbai Kecil | | Principality | 1658–1917 | Asia: Southeast | Indonesia |
| | Wehali | | Principality | 1500–1949 | Asia: Southeast | Indonesia |
| | Amanatun | | Principality | 1642–1962 | Asia: Southeast | Indonesia |
| | Kingdom of Champasak | | Kingdom | 1713–1946 | Asia: Southeast | Laos |
| | Kingdom of Luang Phrabang | | Kingdom | 1707–1947 | Asia: Southeast | Laos |
| | Muang Phuan | | Kingdom | 13th century–1833 | Asia: Southeast | Laos |
| | Kingdom of Vientiane | | Kingdom | 1707–1828 | Asia: Southeast | Laos |
| | Federated Malay States | | | 1895–1942; 1945–1946 | Asia: Southeast | Malaysia |
| | Sultanate of Pahang | | Sultanate | 1470–1896 | Asia: Southeast | Malaysia |
| | Perak Sultanate: Siak dynasty | | Sultanate | 1528–1896 | Asia: Southeast | Malaysia |
| | Sultanate of Sambas | Sambas | Sultanate | 1609–1956 | Asia: Southeast | Malaysia |
| | Selangor Sultanate | | Sultanate | 1745–1896 | Asia: Southeast | Malaysia |
| Alaungpaya Dynasty of Myanmar | Konbaung dynasty | | Monarchy | 1752–1885 | Asia: Southeast | Myanmar |
| | Kingdom of Cambodia: Middle Period | | Kingdom | early 15th century–1863 | Asia: Southeast | Cambodia |
| | Sultanate of Maguindanao | | Sultanate | 1500–1888 | Asia: Southeast | Philippines |
| | Spanish East Indies, part of the Captaincy General of the Philippines | | Colony, Spanish | 1565–1898 | Asia: Southeast | Philippines |
| | Kingdom of Chiang Mai | | Kingdom | 1802–1899 | Asia: Southeast | Thailand |
| | Principality of Hà Tiên | | Principality | 1707–1832 | Asia: Southeast | Thailand |
| Thailand 1855 | Rattanakosin Kingdom of Siam | | Kingdom | 1782–1932 | Asia: Southeast | Thailand |
| | Annam (French protectorate) | | Protectorate, French | 1884–1945; 1945–1949 | Asia: Southeast | Vietnam |
| | Champa | Indrapura, Vijaya, Panduranga | Kingdom | 192–1832 | Asia: Southeast | Vietnam |
| | Sip Song Chau Tai | | Chiefdoms | 17th century–1954 | Asia: Southeast | Vietnam |
| | Cochinchina | | Colony, French | 1862–1945; 1945–1949 | Asia: Southeast | Vietnam |
| | Việt Nam: Nguyễn dynasty | | Empire (1802–1883), Protectorate (1884–1945) | 1802–1945 | Asia: Southeast | Vietnam |
| | Tây Sơn dynasty | | Kingdom | 1778–1802 | Asia: Southeast | Vietnam |
| | Tonkin | | | 1884–1945; 1945–1949 | Asia: Southeast | Vietnam |
| | North Borneo | | | 1882–1941 | Asia: Southeast | Malaysia |
| | Kingdom of Sarawak | | Kingdom | 1841–1941; 1945–1946 | Asia: Southeast | Malaysia |
| | Johor Sultanate | | Sultanate | 1528–c.1949 | Asia: Southeast | Malaysia |
| | Pattani kingdom | | Kingdom | 1516–1902 | Asia: Southeast | Malaysia |
| | Straits Settlements | | Territory, British | 1826–1942; 1945–1946 | Asia: Southeast | Malaysia |
| | Sultanate of Sulu | Various | Sultanate/client | 1405–1915 | Asia: Southeast | Philippines |
| Emirate of Ha'il | Emirate of Jabal Shammar | | Emirate | 1836–1921 | Asia: West | Arabia |
| Emirate of Soran | Soran Emirate | | Emirate | 1530s–1835 | Asia: West | Iran |
| | Sheikhdom of Kuwait | | Sheikhdom | 1752–1961 | Asia: West | Kuwait |
| | Muscat and Oman | | | 1820–1970 | Asia: West | Oman |
| | Imamate of Oman | | Imamate | 751–1970 | Asia: West | Oman |
| | Omani Empire | | Empire | 1696–1856 | Asia: West | Oman |
| | Persia: Qajar dynasty | | Monarchy | 1789–1925 | Asia: West | Persia |
| | Bani Khalid Emirate | | Emirate | 1669–1800 | Asia: West | Saudi Arabia |
| | Emirate of Nejd | | Emirate | 1812–1891 | Asia: West | Saudi Arabia |
| | Emirate of Diriyah | | Emirate | 1744–1818 | Asia: West | Saudi Arabia |
| | Ottoman Empire | | Empire | 1299–1923 | Asia: West | Turkey |
| | Trucial States | | | 1820–1971 | Asia: West | United Arab Emirates |
| | Baidah Sultanate | | | 1636–1930 | Asia: West | Yemen |
| | Emirate of Beihan | | Emirate | 17th century–1967 | Asia: West | Yemen |
| | Emirate of Dhala | | Emirate | 15th century–1967 | Asia: West | Yemen |
| | Mahra Sultanate | | | 1432–1967 | Asia: West | Yemen |
| | Principality of Najran | | | 1633–1934 | Asia: West | Yemen |
| | Upper Aulaqi Sheikhdom | | Sheikhdom | 18th century–1967 | Asia: West | Yemen |
| | Upper Aulaqi Sultanate | | Sultanate | 18th century–1967 | Asia: West | Yemen |
| State of Upper Yafa | Upper Yafa | | Sultanate | c.1800–1967 | Asia: West | Yemen |
| | Wahidi Balhaf | | | c.1640–1967 | Asia: West | Yemen |
| | Wahidi Haban | | | c.1640–1967 | Asia: West | Yemen |
| | Yemeni Zaidi State | | | 1597–1849 | Asia: West | Yemen |
| | Principality of Guria | | Principality | 1460s–1829 | Eurasia: Caucasus | Georgia |
| | Elisu Sultanate | | Sultanate | 1260–1810 | Eurasia: Caucasus | Azerbaijan |
| | Caucasian Imamate | | Imamate | 1829–1859 | Eurasia: Caucasus | Dagestan |
| | Kingdom of Imereti | Ilisu | Kingdom | 1604–1844 | Eurasia: Caucasus | Georgia |
| | Kingdom of Kartli-Kakheti | | Kingdom | 1762–1801 | Eurasia: Caucasus | Georgia |
| | Principality of Mingrelia | | Principality | 1557–1867 | Eurasia: Caucasus | Georgia |
| | Samtskhe-Saatabago | | Principality | 1266–1625 | Eurasia: Caucasus | Georgia |
| | Principality of Bulgaria | | Principality | 1878–1908 | Europe: Balkans | Bulgaria |
| Croatia Landesfarben | Kingdom of Croatia (Habsburg) | | Kingdom | 1527–1868 | Europe: Balkans | Croatia |
| | Kingdom of Croatia-Slavonia | | Kingdom | 1868–1918 | Europe: Balkans | Croatia |
| | Republic of Ragusa | Ragusa | Republic | 1358–1807 | Europe: Balkans | Croatia |
| | Kingdom of Greece | Various | Kingdom | 1832–1924; 1935–1941; 1944–1974 | Europe: Balkans | Greece |
| | United States of the Ionian Islands | | | 1815–1864 | Europe: Balkans | Greece |
| | Septinsular Republic | | Republic | 1800–1815 | Europe: Balkans | Greece |
| | First Hellenic Republic | | Republic | 1828–1832 | Europe: Balkans | Greece |
| | Kosovo Vilayet | | | 1877–1913 | Europe: Balkans | Kosovo |
| Prince-Bishopric of Montenegro2 | Prince-Bishopric of Montenegro | | Prince-Bishopric | 1696–1852 | Europe: Balkans | Montenegro |
| | Principality of Montenegro | | Principality | 1852–1910 | Europe: Balkans | Montenegro |
| ➝ | Kingdom of Serbia | | Kingdom | 1882–1918 | Europe: Balkans | Serbia |
| | Principality of Serbia | | Principality | 1815–1882 | Europe: Balkans | Serbia |
| | Illyrian Provinces | | Protectorate, French | 1809–1816 | Europe: Balkans | Slovenia |
| ➝ | United Kingdom of Great Britain and Ireland | London | Kingdom | 1801–1922 | Europe: British Isles | United Kingdom |
| | Austria-Hungary | Vienna, Budapest | Monarchy | 1867–1918 | Europe: Central | Austria |
| | Archduchy of Austria | Vienna | Archduchy | 1453–1806/1918 | Europe: Central | Austria |
| | Habsburg monarchy | | Composite monarchy | 1526–1804 | Europe: Central | Austria |
| Habsburg Monarchy | Austrian Empire | Vienna | Empire | 1804–1867 | Europe: Central | Austrian |
| | Kingdom of Bohemia | | Kingdom | 1198–1918 | Europe: Central | Czech Republic |
| | German Confederation | | Confederation | 1815–1866 | Europe: Central | Germany |
| | German Empire | Berlin | Empire | 1871–1918 | Europe: Central | Germany |
| | Holy Roman Empire | Hamburg | Empire | 962–1806 | Europe: Central | Germany |
| | North German Confederation | | Confederation | 1867–1871 | Europe: Central | Germany |
| | Confederation of the Rhine | | Confederation | 1806–1813 | Europe: Central | Germany |
| | Duchy of Anhalt | | Duchy | 1806–1918 | Europe: Central | Germany |
| Anhalt Duchies | Anhalt-Bernburg | | Monarchy | 1252–1468; 1603–1863 | Europe: Central | Germany |
| | Anhalt-Dessau | | Monarchy | 1396–1561; 1603–1863 | Europe: Central | Germany |
| Anhalt Duchies | Anhalt-Köthen | | Monarchy | 1396–1561; 1603–1853 | Europe: Central | Germany |
| | Principality of Aschaffenburg | | Principality | 1803–1810 | Europe: Central | Germany |
| | Grand Duchy of Baden | | Grand Duchy | 1806–1918 | Europe: Central | Germany |
| | Kingdom of Bavaria | | Kingdom | 1805–1918 | Europe: Central | Germany |
| | Grand Duchy of Berg | | Grand Duchy | 1806–1813 | Europe: Central | Germany |
| | Bremen | | City-state republic | 1806–1867 | Europe: Central | Germany |
| | Duchy of Brunswick | Braunschweig | Duchy | 1815–1918 | Europe: Central | Germany |
| | Free City of Frankfurt | | City-state republic | 1372–1806; 1816–1866 | Europe: Central | Germany |
| | Grand Duchy of Frankfurt | | Client Grand Duchy | 1810–1813 | Europe: Central | Germany |
| | Free Imperial City of Hamburg | | City-state | 1806–1867 | Europe: Central | Germany |
| Hanover | Electorate of Brunswick-Lüneburg | | Electorate | 1692–1807 | Europe: Central | Germany |
| | Kingdom of Hanover | | Kingdom | 1814–1866 | Europe: Central | Germany |
| | Electorate of Hesse | | Monarchy | 1803–1807; 1813–1866 | Europe: Central | Germany |
| | Grand Duchy of Hesse and by Rhine | | Grand Duchy | 1806–1918 | Europe: Central | Germany |
| | Landgraviate of Hesse-Darmstadt | | Landgraviate | 1567–1806 | Europe: Central | Germany |
| | Hesse-Homburg | | Landgraviate | 1622–1866 | Europe: Central | Germany |
| Hohenzollern-Hechingen and Sigmaringen | Hohenzollern-Hechingen | | Monarchy | 1576–1850 | Europe: Central | Germany |
| Hohenzollern-Hechingen and Sigmaringen | Hohenzollern-Sigmaringen | | Monarchy | 1576–1850 | Europe: Central | Germany |
| | Principality of Leyen | | Client Principality | 1806–1814 | Europe: Central | Germany |
| | Principality of Lippe | | Principality | 1123–1918 | Europe: Central | Germany |
| | Free City of Lübeck | | City-state | 1226–1811; 1815–1937 | Europe: Central | Germany |
| | Electorate of Mainz | | Monarchy | 780–1803 | Europe: Central | Germany |
| | Duchy of Mecklenburg-Schwerin | | Duchy | 1379–1815 | Europe: Central | Germany |
| | Grand Duchy of Mecklenburg-Schwerin | | Grand Duchy | 1815–1918 | Europe: Central | Germany |
| | Duchy of Mecklenburg-Strelitz | | Duchy | 1701–1815 | Europe: Central | Germany |
| | Grand Duchy of Mecklenburg-Strelitz | | Grand Duchy | 1815–1918 | Europe: Central | Germany |
| | Duchy of Nassau | | Duchy | 1806–1866 | Europe: Central | Germany |
| | Grand Duchy of Oldenburg | | Grand Duchy | 1814–1918 | Europe: Central | Germany |
| | Kingdom of Prussia | | Kingdom | 1701–1918 | Europe: Central | Germany |
| Kingdom of Prussia | Prussia | | Kingdom | 1525–1947 | Europe: Central | Germany |
| | Principality of Regensburg | | Principality | 1803–1810 | Europe: Central | Germany |
| | Reuss | | | c.1010–1778/1806 | Europe: Central | Germany |
| | Reuss-Ebersdorf | | Monarchy | 1678–1824 | Europe: Central | Germany |
| | Principality of Reuss-Gera | | Principality | 1806–1918 | Europe: Central | Germany |
| | Principality of Reuss-Greiz | | Principality | 1778–1918 | Europe: Central | Germany |
| | Reuss-Lobenstein | | Monarchy | 1425–1547; 1647–1824 | Europe: Central | Germany |
| | Duchy of Saxe-Altenburg | | Duchy | 1602–1672; 1826–1920 | Europe: Central | Germany |
| | Saxe-Coburg and Gotha | | Duchy | 1826–1918 | Europe: Central | Germany |
| | Saxe-Coburg-Saalfeld | | Duchy | 1699–1825 | Europe: Central | Germany |
| | Saxe-Gotha-Altenburg | | Duchy | 1680–1826 | Europe: Central | Germany |
| | Saxe-Hildburghausen | | Duchy | 1680–1826 | Europe: Central | Germany |
| | Saxe-Lauenburg | | Duchy | 1296–1803; 1814–1876 | Europe: Central | Germany |
| | Duchy of Saxe-Meiningen | | Duchy | 1680–1918 | Europe: Central | Germany |
| | Grand Duchy of Saxe-Weimar-Eisenach | | Grand Duchy | 1809–1918 | Europe: Central | Germany |
| Saxony | Kingdom of Saxony | | Kingdom | 1806–1918 | Europe: Central | Germany |
| | Principality of Schaumburg-Lippe | | Principality | 1643–1918 | Europe: Central | Germany |
| | Schwarzburg-Rudolstadt | | Principality | 1599–1919 | Europe: Central | Germany |
| | Schwarzburg-Sondershausen | | Principality | 1599–1920 | Europe: Central | Germany |
| Germany | Waldeck | | Principality | 1180–1918 | Europe: Central | Germany |
| | Kingdom of Westphalia | | Kingdom | 1807–1813 | Europe: Central | Germany |
| | Württemberg | | Monarchy | 11th century–1918 | Europe: Central | Germany |
| Grandduchy of Wurzburg | Grand Duchy of Würzburg | | Grand Duchy | 1805–1814 | Europe: Central | Germany |
| | Kingdom of Hungary | Various | Kingdom | 1000–1918 | Europe: Central | Hungary |
| | Liechtenstein | | Principality | 1806–present | Europe: Central | Liechtenstein |
| | Kingdom of Galicia and Lodomeria | | Kingdom | 1772–1918 | Europe: Central | Poland |
| | Free City of Kraków | | City-state republic | 1815–1846 | Europe: Central | Poland |
| | Duchy of Warsaw | | Occupation | 1807–1815 | Europe: Central | Poland |
| | Helvetic Republic | | Republic | 1798–1803 | Europe: Central | Switzerland |
| | Switzerland of the Napoleonic era | | Confederation | 1803–1815 | Europe: Central | Switzerland |
| | Restoration and Regeneration in Switzerland | | | 1815–1848 | Europe: Central | Switzerland |
| | Switzerland | | | 1848–present | Europe: Central | Switzerland |
| | Principality of Moldavia | | Principality | 1346–1859 | Europe: East | Romania |
| United Principalities of Romania | United Principalities of Moldavia and Wallachia | | Principalities | 1859–1881 | Europe: East | Romania |
| | Kingdom of Romania | | Kingdom | 1881–1947 | Europe: East | Romania |
| | Principality of Wallachia | | Principality | 1330–1859 | Europe: East | Romania |
| | Governorate of Estonia | | Province (Russia) | 1721–1917 | Europe: East, Baltic | Estonia |
| | Russian Empire | | Empire | 1721–1917 | Europe: East; Asia: Central | Russia |
| | Denmark | Various | Kingdom | 1814–present | Europe: Nordic | Denmark |
| | Denmark–Norway | | Kingdom | 1524–1814 | Europe: Nordic | Denmark |
| | Duchy of Schleswig | | Duchy | 1058–1866 | Europe: Nordic | Denmark |
| Russia | Grand Duchy of Finland | | Grand Duchy | 1809–1917 | Europe: Nordic | Finland |
| | Kingdom of Norway (1814) | | Kingdom | 1814 | Europe: Nordic | Norway |
| | Gustavian era Sweden | | | 1523–1814; 1905–present | Europe: Nordic | Sweden |
| | Sweden and Norway | Various | Kingdom | 1814–1905 | Europe: Nordic | Sweden |
| Repubblica Cisalpina | Cisalpine Republic | | Republic | 1797–1802 | Europe: Southcentral | Italy |
| | Republic of Cospaia | | Republic | 1440–1826 | Europe: Southcentral | Italy |
| | Sovereign Principality of Elba | | Principality | 1814–1815 | Europe: Southcentral | Italy |
| | Kingdom of Etruria | | Kingdom | 1801–1807 | Europe: Southcentral | Italy |
| | Republic of Genoa | | Republic | 1005–1797; 1814–1815 | Europe: Southcentral | Italy |
| | Italian Republic (Napoleonic) | | Republic/client | 1802–1805 | Europe: Southcentral | Italy |
| Napoleonic Kingdom of Italy | Kingdom of Italy (Napoleonic) | | Kingdom | 1805–1814 | Europe: Southcentral | Italy |
| | Kingdom of Italy | | Kingdom | 1861–1946 | Europe: Southcentral | Italy |
| Genoa | Ligurian Republic | | Republic | 1797–1805 | Europe: Southcentral | Italy |
| Kingdom of Lombardy-Venetia | Kingdom of Lombardy–Venetia | | Kingdom | 1815–1866 | Europe: Southcentral | Italy |
| | Lucca | | Duchy | 1815–1847 | Europe: Southcentral | Italy |
| Massa and Carrara | Republic of Lucca | Lucca | Republic | 1160–1805 | Europe: Southcentral | Italy |
| Massa and Carrara | Duchy of Massa and Principality of Carrara | | Duchy | 15th–19th century | Europe: Southcentral | Italy |
| | Duchy of Modena and Reggio | | Duchy | 1452–1796; 1814–1859 | Europe: Southcentral | Italy |
| | Kingdom of Naples | | Kingdom | 1285–1816 | Europe: Southcentral | Italy |
| | Kingdoms of Naples and Sicily | | Kingdom | 1043–1410; 1442–1500; 1735–1816 | Europe: Southcentral | Italy |
| | Duchy of Parma | | Duchy | 1545–1859 | Europe: Southcentral | Italy |
| | Kingdom of Sardinia | Cagliari, Turin | Kingdom | 1324–1861 | Europe: Southcentral | Italy |
| | Kingdom of Trinacria: Sicily | Various | Kingdom | 1130–1816 | Europe: Southcentral | Italy |
| | Duchy of Tridentum | Benevento | Duchy/Principality | 574–1802 | Europe: Southcentral | Italy |
| | Grand Duchy of Tuscany | | Grand Duchy | 1569–1801; 1815–1859 | Europe: Southcentral | Italy |
| | Kingdom of the Two Sicilies | | Kingdom | 1816–1861 | Europe: Southcentral | Italy |
| Kingdom of the Two Sicilies | Gozo | | | 1798–1801 | Europe: Southcentral | Italy |
| | Roman Republic (19th century) | | Republic | 1849 | Europe: Southcentral | Italy |
| United Kingdom | Malta Protectorate | | Protectorate, British | 1800–1813 | Europe: Southcentral | Malta |
| | Crown Colony of Malta | | Colony, British | 1813–1964 | Europe: Southcentral | Malta |
| | Papal States | Rome | Pontificate | 754–1870 | Europe: Southcentral | Papal |
| → | San Marino | San Marino | Republic | AD 301–present | Europe: Southcentral | San Marino |
| | Andorra | | Principality | 1278–present | Europe: Southwest | Andorra |
| | Kingdom of Portugal | Various | Kingdom | 1139–1910 | Europe: Southwest | Portugal |
| | Bourbon Spain | | Kingdom | 1700–1812 | Europe: Southwest | Spain |
| Spain | First Spanish Republic | | Republic | 1873–1874 | Europe: Southwest | Spain |
| | Kingdom of Spain (1810–1873) | | Kingdom | 1813–1873 | Europe: Southwest | Spain |
| | Bourbon Restoration of Spain | Toledo, Madrid | Kingdom | 1874–1931 | Europe: Southwest | Spain |
| | Kingdom of Galicia | Santiago de Compostela | Kingdom | 409–1833 | Europe: Southwest | Spain |
| | Alsace-Lorraine | | German Colony | 1871–1918 | Europe: West | France |
| | Bourbon Restoration in France | Paris | | 1814–1815; 1815–1830 | Europe: West | France |
| France | First French Empire | | Empire | 1804–1814; 1815 | Europe: West | France |
| France official | French First Republic | | Republic | 1792–1804 | Europe: West | France |
| France | French Second Republic | | Republic | 1848–1852 | Europe: West | France |
| France | July Monarchy | | Monarchy | 1830–1848 | Europe: West | France |
| France | French Third Republic | | Republic | 1870–1940 | Europe: West | France |
| France | Second French Empire | | Empire | 1852–1870 | Europe: West | France |
| | Roquebrune-Cap-Martin | | | 1848–1860 | Europe: West | France |
| | Monaco | | | 1419–1793; 1814–present | Europe: West | Monaco |
| | Belgium | Brussels | Kingdom | 1830–present | Europe: West, Low Countries | Belgium |
| | Luxembourg | | | 1815–present | Europe: West, Low Countries | Luxembourg |
| Netherlands | Batavian Republic | | Republic | 1795–1806 | Europe: West, Low Countries | Netherlands |
| Netherlands | Kingdom of Holland | | Kingdom | 1806–1810 | Europe: West, Low Countries | Netherlands |
| | Sovereign Principality of the United Netherlands | | Principality | 1813–1815 | Europe: West, Low Countries | Netherlands |
| | United Kingdom of the Netherlands | | Kingdom | 1815–1839 | Europe: West, Low Countries | Netherlands |
| | Kingdom of the Netherlands | | Kingdom | 1839–present | Europe: West, Low Countries | Netherlands |
| →→ | Colony of New South Wales | Syndey | Colony, British | 1788-1900 | Oceania | Australia, New Zealand |
| | Colony of Queensland | Brisbane | Colony, British | 1859-1900 | Oceania | Australia, Papua New Guinea |
| → | Colony of South Australia | Adelaide | Colony, British | 1836-1900 | Oceania | Australia |
| → | Colony of Tasmania | Hobart | Colony, British | 1856-1900 | Oceania | Australia |
| | Van Dieman's Land | Hobart | Colony, British | 1825-1856 | Oceania | Australia |
| → | Colony of Victoria | Melbourne | Colony, British | 1851-1900 | Oceania | Australia |
| | Easter Island | | Kingdom | 900–1878 | Oceania | Chile (Easter Island) |
| | Cook Islands Federation | | Federation | 1893–1901 | Oceania | Cook Islands |
| Rarotonga 1888-1893 | Kingdom of Rarotonga | | Kingdom | 1858–1893 | Oceania | Cook Islands |
| | Colony of Fiji | | Colony, British | 1874–1970 | Oceania | Fiji |
| | Kingdom of Fiji | | Kingdom | 1871–1874 | Oceania | Fiji |
| | Kingdom of Bora Bora | | Kingdom | Early 19th century–1895* | Oceania | French Polynesia |
| | Kingdom of Huahine | | Kingdom | 1760–1895 | Oceania | French Polynesia |
| Kingdom of Mangareva 1832-1843 | Kingdom of Mangareva | | Kingdom | 18th century–1881 | Oceania | French Polynesia |
| | Raiatea | | Monarchy | 18th century–1888 | Oceania | French Polynesia |
| | Kingdom of Tahiti | | Kingdom | 1788–1880 | Oceania | French Polynesia |
| | Gilbert and Ellice Islands | | British Colony | 1892–1976 | Oceania | Kiribati |
| Territory of Papua | British New Guinea | Port Moresby | Colony, British | 1884-1902 | Oceania | Papua New Guinea |
| | German New Guinea | | Colony, German | 1884–1919 | Oceania | Papua New Guinea |
| United Kingdom | Colony of New Zealand | Okiato (1841) Auckland (1841-1865) Wellington (from 1865) | Colony, British | 1841–1907 | Oceania | New Zealand |
| | United Tribes of New Zealand | Waitangi | Māori confederation | 1835-1840 | Oceania | New Zealand |
| | Niuean monarchy | | Monarchy | c. 1700–1900 | Oceania | Niue |
| | British protectorate of Niue | | Protectorate, British | 1900–1974 | Oceania | Niue |
| Kingdom of Samoa | Malietoa dynasty (Samoa) | | Monarchy | pre-1858–1900 | Oceania | Samoa |
| Deutsch-Samoa | German Samoa | | Colony, German | 1900–1920 | Oceania | Samoa |
| United Kingdom | British Solomon Islands | | Colony, British | 1893–1978 | Oceania | Solomon Islands |
| | Tui Manua dynasty (Samoa) | | Monarchy | up to 1900 | Oceania | Samoa |
| | Kingdom of Tonga (1900–1970) | | Protectorate | 1900–1970 | Oceania | Tonga |
| | Tonga | | Kingdom | 1845–1900; 1970–present | Oceania | Tonga |
| | Tuʻi Tonga Empire | | Empire | 450s–1865 | Oceania | Tonga |
| → | Hawaiian Kingdom | | Kingdom | 1795–1893 | Oceania | United States |
| | Provisional Government of Hawaii | | Provisional Government | 1893–1894 | Oceania | United States |
| | Republic of Hawaii | | Republic | 1894–1898 | Oceania | United States |
| Franceville | Anglo-French Joint Naval Commission | | Colony, British/French | 1887–1906 | Oceania | Vanuatu |

== See also ==
- List of Bronze Age states
- List of Iron Age states
- List of Classical Age states
- List of states during Late Antiquity
- List of states during the Middle Ages

List of political entities in the 19th century
| Preceded by 18th century | Political entities of the 19th century | Succeeded by 20th century |
