= Amanuban =

Former country

Coordinates: 9°49′S 124°28′E

Amanuban was a traditional princedom in West Timor, Indonesia. It lay in the regency (kabupaten) Timor Tengah Selatan. In the late colonial period, according to an estimate in 1930, Amanuban covered 2,075 square kilometers. The centre of the princedom since the 19th century was Niki-Niki. The population belongs to the Atoni group. Today they are predominantly Protestants, with a significant Catholic minority and some Muslims.

== Early history ==
The ancestor of the royal line is said to have come from Roti island, west of Timor. Amanuban is mentioned in Dutch sources as early as 1613, when the Dutch East India Company (Vereenigde Oost-Indische Compagnie or VOC) first approached Timor. Amanuban had resources of sandalwood, which was the main Western interest on the island. The Dutch concluded a contract with the King of Amanuban in 1616, but the princedom came under the influence of the Portuguese, political and commercial rivals of the Dutch. This influence lasted up to 1748. During this period there was intermittent warfare with the VOC enclave around Kupang in westernmost Timor. A political crisis in 1748 turned a number of Atoni princedoms, including Amanuban, against the Topasses or Portuguese Eurasians on Timor. After the Topass defeat at the hand of the VOC in the Battle of Penfui on November 1749, the territory of Amanuban was included in the Dutch political alliance network.

== Anti-Dutch resistance ==
After 1770 dynastic disputes led to a split. The larger part of Amanuban joined the prince Tobani who ruled independently of the Dutch. His son Louis (c. 1807-c. 1824) led a violently anti-Dutch policy and trained a large mounted corps of warriors with firearms. The Dutch (and the British during the 1812–1816 interregnum) sent a number of armed expeditions against Louis, without much success. In later tradition Louis is pointed out as the founder of the royal seat Niki-Niki. After his death the coherence of Amanuban declined.

The last independent king, Bil Nope alias Hau Sufa Leu (c. 1870–1910) befriended the encroaching Dutch colonial authorities in the early years of the 20th century. However, the arrogant stance of the local Dutch officer caused anti-colonial resistance. Finally Bil Nope died in the flames of his residence in Niki-Niki in October 1910. In modern Indonesia he is regarded as an anti-colonial hero.

== Under colonial rule ==
Another branch of the dynasty was enthroned, and Amanuban continued as a zelfbesturende landschap (self-ruling territory) under colonial surveillance until the departure of the Dutch (1942 and 1949). In 1952, a few years after the formation of a unitary Indonesian republic, the princedom was turned into a so-called swapraja, still with the old ruler as headman (kepala daerah swapraja). In 1959 a new administrative region (Daerah Tingkat II), Timor Tengah Selatan was formed, and included the old swaprajas Mollo, Amanuban and Amanatun. In 1962–63 the swapraja, and with it the last remnants of traditional governance, was abrogated by official decree. Members of the old ruling family, Nope, still have an amount of local informal influence.

== List of rulers ==
- Don Michel before 1749–1751
- Don Louis 1751–1770 (brother)
- Don Jacobus Albertus 1770–1786 (son)
- Tobani 1786–c. 1807 (cousin)
- Louis c. 1807–c. 1824 (son)
- Baki c. 1824–1862 (son)
- Sanu 1862-c. 1870 (son)
- Bil Nope c. 1870–1910 (son)
- Noni Nope 1910–1920 (brother)
- Pae Nope 1920–1946 (son)
- Paulus Nope 1946–1949 (son)
- Kusa Nope 1946–1958 (brother)
