= Osubi =

- Location in Nigeria
- Coordinates: 5°35′50″N 5°49′10″E
- Country: Nigeria
- State: Delta State

Osubi is a town in Okpe Local Government Area of Delta state, southern Nigeria. The population is approximately over 8000 people.

Osubi Airport is located in Osubi. There is a rapid infrastructural development around the airport region due to the closeness and prominence to the Niger Delta oil-producing area of Nigeria.

The Osubi community has a democratically elected board of trustees. The board is headed by Chief Okakuro (Councillor), PA Gbinije and Anthony Agbude. ('Members of the Traditional Ruling Council of Okpe Kingdom, headed by his majesty H.R.M. Orhue I, King of Okpe). Amongst other members, the board of trustees duties are to ensure democracy, equality and economic growth of the community.

Revenue is generated from the proceeds of sales and lease of the vast landed properties for domestic construction, agricultural and industrial use. Land mass had been allocated in the past to dredging and potentially other natural mineral resources prospects. Typically, revenue is re-invested back into the community through carrying out projects of social economic growth for the benefit of the community.

As an ongoing process the community had been able to provide electricity, roads, and redevelopment of its market place. A town hall was also provided at the town centre.

The Delta State Trade Fair Complex is located within Osubi.
