= Warri Airport =

Osubi Airstrip
- IATA: QRW; ICAO: DNSU

Summary
- Airport type: Public
- Owner/Operator: Shell
- Location: Osubi, Nigeria
- Time zone: WAT (UTC+01:00)
- Elevation AMSL: 27 ft (8.2 m)
- Coordinates: 5°35′50″N 5°49′10″E

Map
- Location of the airport in Nigeria

Runways
Direction	Length		Surface
Direction	m	ft	Surface
06/24	1,800	5,906	Asphalt

Statistics (2015)
- Passengers: 187,630
- Passenger change 14–15: ▼15.2%
- Sources: Google Maps GCM

Osubi Airstrip (IATA: QRW, ICAO: DNSU) is an aviation facility located in Osubi, within Okpe Local Government, serving the city of Effurun, Warri and its environs in Delta State, Nigeria. It is about 10 kilometres (6.2 mi) northeast of the city.

Osubi is a town in Okpe Local Government Area of Delta State, Southern Nigeria.

The runway length does not include a 150 metres (490 ft) displaced threshold/overrun on each end, making the total paved length 2,100 metres (6,900 ft). The Osubi non-directional beacon (Ident: OS) is located on the field.

== Airstrip ==
Before the construction of the airport, a small airstrip had been created next to a congested part of the city of Warri during the 1960s. The runway was approximately 700 metres (2,300 ft) in length. There was a small terminal building and an aircraft hangar. Small charter aircraft of Aero Contractors and other firms provided service to and from Lagos airport and other Nigerian cities.

== Construction of the airport ==
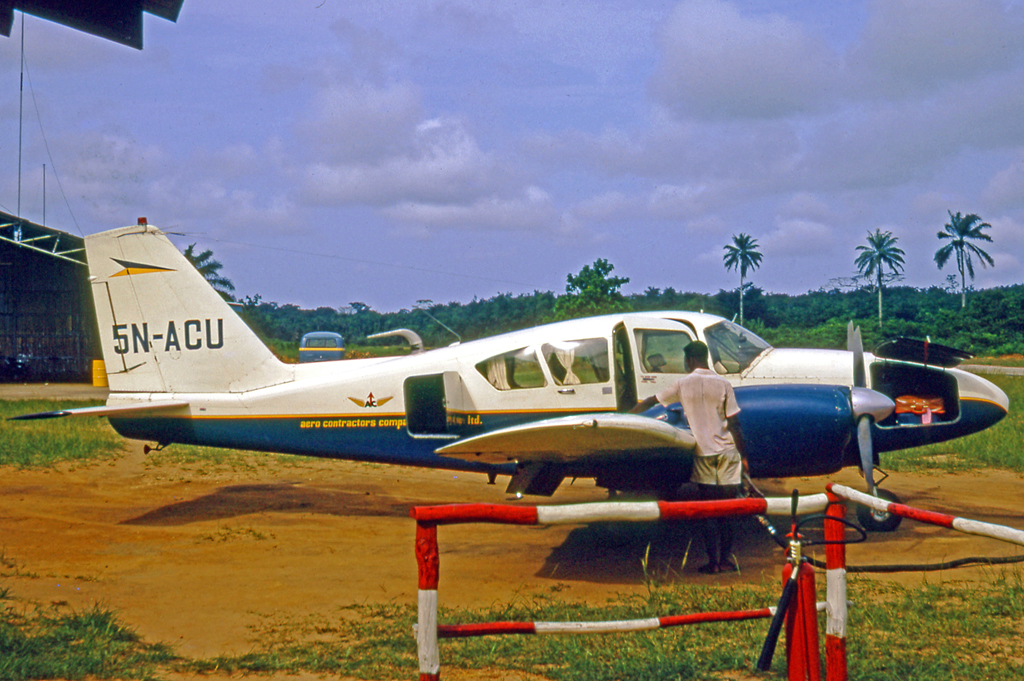
Piper PA-23 Aztec of Aero Contractors (Nigeria) at Warri airstrip in May 1970

The federal government first drew up plans to build an airport here in the late 1970s to allow easy transport into Warri by air because of its status as an oil city, but the plan languished for over two decades. Meanwhile, people coming in and out of Warri continued to use the old airstrip in a congested part of the city. The airstrip could only accommodate small aircraft on its short runway, so that whenever a plane took off or landed, the authorities had to close off an adjacent road to traffic so that a passing car would not be clipped.

Finding it harder and harder to conduct business with the old airstrip, Shell decided to build one on its own. The airport was commissioned and opened for commercial use on 1 April 1999 with Shell (SPDC) landing a modern Dornier 328 and Aero Contractors 50-passenger Dash aircraft at the Osubi airport. Since the airstrip opened for public use, it is reckoned to be one of the busiest aviation facilities in Nigeria and it is being operated in partnership with other oil companies.

The maintenance and facilities are among the best in the country and traffic flow is one of the highest. In the first six months of the opening of Osubi Airstrip, more than 100,000 passengers passed through just as it handled 3,500 aircraft movements.

The Delta State government is making plans with the airstrip operator Shell to upgrade and build a longer second runway of 3,700 metres (12,100 ft) due to the increase in air traffic.

== Airlines and destinations ==
Airlines	Destinations
Aero Contractors	Lagos
Air Peace	Abuja, Lagos
Arik Air	Abuja, Lagos

== Statistics ==
These data show the number of passengers' movements into the airport, according to the Federal Airports Authority of Nigeria's Aviation Sector Summary Reports.

Year	2010	2011	2012	2013	2014	2015
Passengers	343,333	365,875	355,661	238,463	221,250	187,630
Growth (%)	▼0.57%	▲6.57%	▼2.79%	▼32.95%	▼7.22%	▼15.20%
Source: Federal Airports Authority of Nigeria (FAAN). Aviation Sector Reports (2010-2013, 2014, Q3-Q4 of 2015, and Q1-Q2 of 2016,)

== See also ==
- Transport in Nigeria
- List of airports in Nigeria
- List of the busiest airports in Africa
