= Okpe =

- LGA and Kingdom
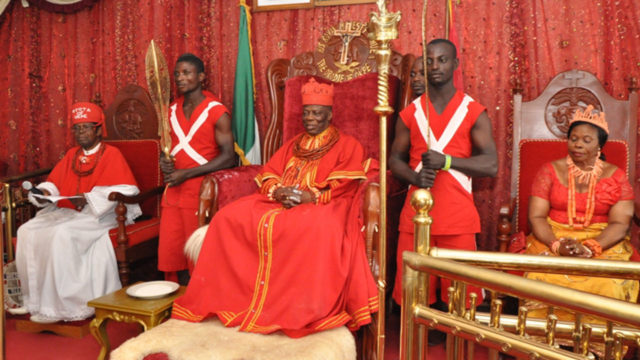
- Interactive map of Okpe
- Location within Nigeria
- Coordinates: 5°26′N 5°57′E
- Country: Nigeria
- State: Delta State
- Headquarters: Orerokpe

Government
  - Orodje (King): H.R.M (Maj-Gen) Orhue I (rtd)

Population (2006)
  - Total: 128,398

Demographics
  - Ethnicity: Urhobo
- Time zone: UTC+1 (WAT)

Okpe is a kingdom in Delta State, Nigeria. Today, it is also the name of a local government area. It is one of the many kingdoms that make up Urhobo nation. Its capital is Orerokpe. This LGA has a total population of 128,398 as at the 2006 census.The kingdom plays host to the Osubi Airport, which is actually located at Osubi and the Delta State Trade Fair Complex. The Orodje celebrated ten years on ancestral throne. Major General Felix Mujakperuo is the king of Okpe. The kingship is usually rotated between the four ruling houses.

== History ==
The Okpe kingdom was established in 1770 , with Orodje Esezi the first becoming the first king . It has a traditional ruler with the title Orodje of Okpe. The Okpe people are known to have migrated to found the present day Sapele and the Orodje of Okpe still exercises authority over the land of Sapele.

The first king produced by this system was H.R.M. Esezi I, Orodje of Okpe, whose sovereignty was around the period of 1770–1779.

H.R.M. Esezi II became the second Orodje of Okpe. As a pioneer advocate of democracy in the land of okpe, he also was pivotal to Nigeria. He was among the delegated kings that attended the 1957 Lyttelton Conference held in London in order to seek the Nigerian independence from the indirect government of the colonial master. He ruled the kingdom around the period of 1945–1966.

H.R.M Orhoro I, the third Orodje of Okpe, ruled the kingdom from around the period of 1972–2004. He was educated at a catholic school and also served in the Nigeria police force. He later earned a Business Administration Diploma in the United Kingdom. His early life experience served him well as a springboard for establishing and becoming a director of a company, the New Africa Industries Limited.

H.R.M Orhue I is the fourth and current king of Okpe. He has served as a major general in the Nigerian Army. He was officially crowned on 29 July 2006.

== Climate ==
The climate in Okpe is classified as tropical monsoon (Am). The city's average annual temperature is 0.82% lower than Nigeria's averages at 28.64 °C (83.55 °F). Okpe generally has 296.16 wet days (81.14% of the time) and receives about 241.52 millimetres (9.51 inches) of precipitation annually.

== Notable people ==
- Joseph Karakitie Azigbo
- Patrick Aziza
- David Dafinone
- Harris Eghagha
