= Orerokpe =

- Location in Nigeria
- Coordinates: 5°36′06″N 5°53′22″E
- Country: Nigeria
- State: Delta State
- Local Government Area: Urhobo

Government
  - Type: Executive
  - Governor: Ifeanyi Okowa
  - Monarchy: H.R.M Orhue I

Population
  - Ethnicities: Urhobo
  - Religions: Christianity; African Traditional Religion
- Time zone: UTC+1 (WAT (UTC+1))

Orerokpe is the headquarters of Okpe LGA in Delta state, Nigeria and the seat of the Orodje of Okpe Kingdom, H.R.M Orhue I.
