= Amanatun =

Atoni princedom

Amanatun was an Atoni princedom situated in what is today Indonesian West Timor, which existed up to 1962. It was also known as the princedom of Onam. The area once included one of the best ports where the commercially important sandalwood was loaded on Dutch and Portuguese ships.

== Origins of the kingdom ==
According to local legend, the ancestor of the royal line, Banu Naek, emerged from the sea together with his brothers Liurai and Sonbai. Liurai settled in South Belu and Sonbai in West Timor, and they were the ancestors of princely lineages in these regions. Banu Naek remained in Nokas and Nitibani near the south coast and was acknowledged as ruler by the locals. Since his belongings, and his own body, were golden (natun), his princedom was given the name Amanatun. The sonaf (residence) of the prince was situated in Nunkolo in the interior, which was inaccessible to enemies. At his side there was a lineage of Uis Pah (lords of the land) with various practical tasks, such as surveying land, defining borders, and deciding shares of the harvest. The Uis Pah stayed at Menu on the south coast, close to the port Boking where trading activities took place. On lower levels of the traditional ruling system, there were fettors (district chiefs) and greater and smaller temukungs (settlement chiefs).

== Contacts with Europeans and Eurasians ==
In European documentary sources the area first appears in the 16th century as Batumean, actually the name of a coastal village. The princedom of Batumean consisted of the more important Amanatun in the west, which subsequently gave its name to the entire domain, and Amanesi (Nenometan) to the east. The sandalwood riches of Batumean soon attracted the Portuguese traders based on Solor and later Larantuka. After 1613 the Dutch East India Company (Vereenigde Oost-Indische Compagnie or VOC) likewise competed for the wood. A third rival was the Indonesian kingdom of Makassar which devastated Batumean with a fleet in 1641. After this calamity Batumean approached the Portuguese Eurasians or Topasses in Larantuka and the princely family was baptized by the Dominican missionaries. In spite of a brief anti-Portuguese resistance in 1655, Batumean stayed a vassal under the Topasses for the next century. The name Batumean disappeared by the end of the 17th century, and the domain was subsequently known just as Amanatun. The resources in sandalwood appears to have dwindled in this period, and the area was left much to itself.

== Under Dutch suzerainty ==
After a major Topass defeat against the VOC forces of Kupang in 1749, large parts of West Timor submitted to Dutch suzerainty, including Amanatun. However, it was too distant from Kupang to be effectively monitored. It was only in the early 20th century that a real colonial rule was implemented. A Dutch column marched into Amanatun in 1906 as a part of a larger campaign of pacification of West Timor. A number of skirmishes with local chiefs took place in the years up to 1910. Some eastern parts of the princedom, Anas-Nenometan, which had previously been absorbed by the Wehali kingdom, were returned to Amanatun in 1910. By this time the princedom covered 917 square kilometers and had 15,300 inhabitants. The raja Muti Banu Naek was deposed in 1915 for his opposition against Dutch designs. His three successors governed as zelfbestuurders (rajas under colonial surveillance) until the definite departure of the Dutch in 1949. The last raja Lodeweyk Lourens Don Louis Banu Naek was in charge of Amanatun in the first years of Indonesian independence to 1962, when it was changed into a kecamatan (administrative district). It is now a part of the kabupaten (regency) Timor Tengah Selatan.

== List of rulers ==
Additional information needed

- Pedro of Batumean mentioned 1642
- João of Batumean mentioned 1645
- Don Louis Nai Konof before 1751-1766
- Don Joan Benao 1766-? (son)
- Nai Taman mentioned 1832
- Loit Banu Naek ?-c. 1899
- Muti Banu Naek c. 1899-1915 (son)
- Kusa Banu Naek 1916-1919 (distant kinsman)
- Kolo Banu Naek 1920-1946 (son of Muti Banu Naek)
- Lodeweyk Lourens Don Louis Banu Naek 1946-1962 (cousin)
