= Goust =

- Hamlet
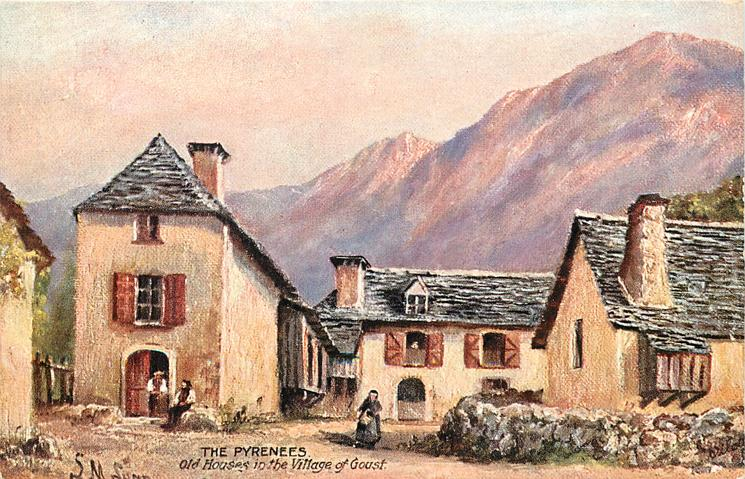
- "Old houses in the village of Goust" (early 1900s postcard)

- Location within France
- Coordinates: 42°57′N 00°27′W
- Country: France
- Region: Aquitaine
- Department: Pyrénées-Atlantiques
- Arrondissement: Oloron-Sainte-Marie
- Canton: Oloron-Sainte-Marie-2
- Commune: Laruns

Area
  - Total: 2.5 km^{2} (0.97 sq mi)

Goust is a French hamlet in the Pyrénées-Atlantiques department of southwestern France. At some point in the 19th century, folklore began to describe it as an independent Republic. Noted for its centenarians, one pensioner was reported to have reached the age of 123, although this is unconfirmed.

== Geography ==
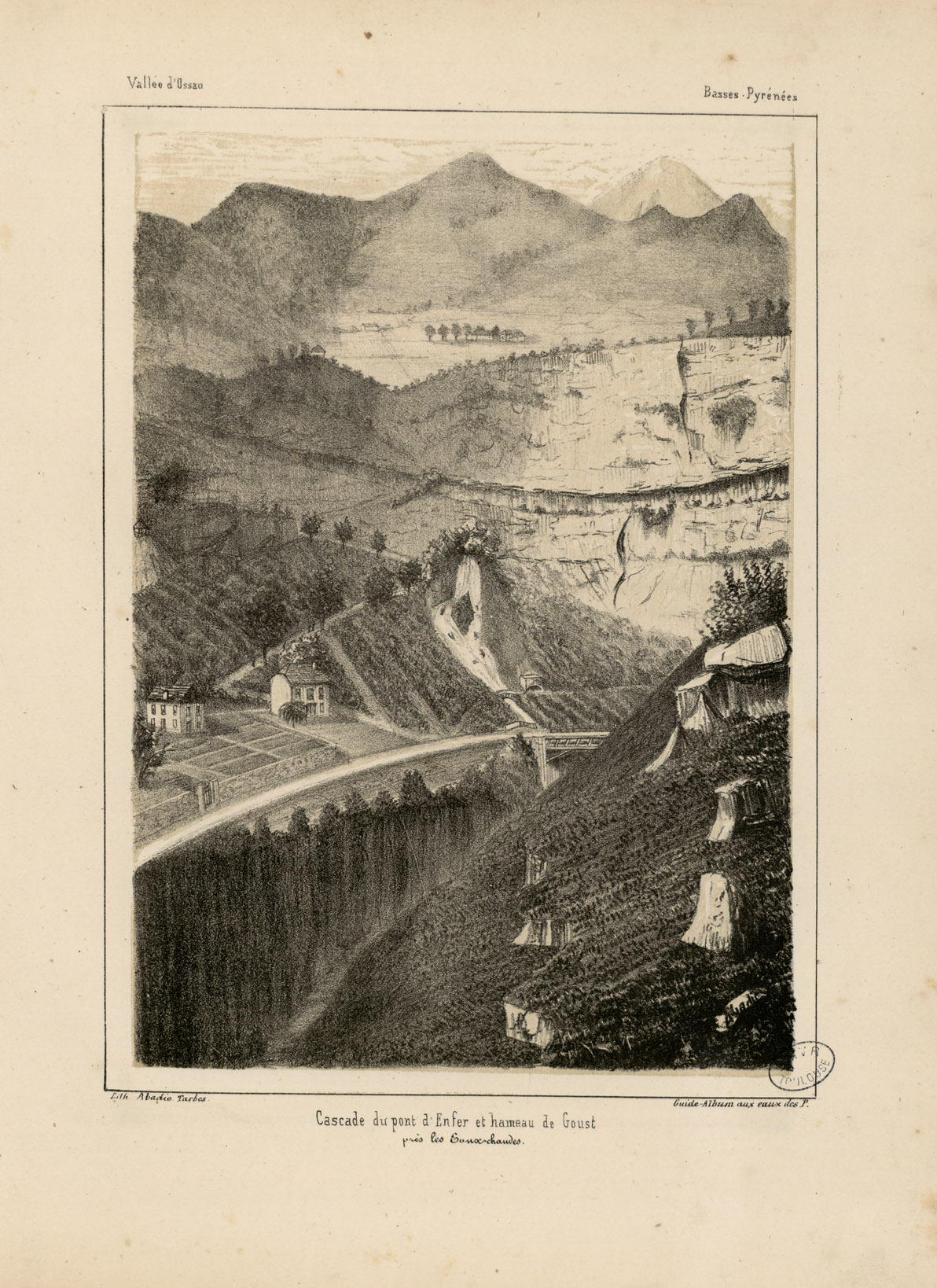
1853 view of Goust and the Pont d'Enfer

Goust is located on the territory of the commune of Laruns. It occupies one square mile on a plateau at the southern (upper) end of the valley of the Gave d'Ossau in the Western Pyrenees, across the river from Eaux-Chaudes. At an elevation of 995 m/3264 ft, it is accessible only by a narrow mountain footpath across the Pont d'Enfer ("Bridge of Hell"). The nearest town is Laruns in the valley below.

The community is made up of 10–12 households, with a population fluctuating between 50 and 150 residents. The traditional economy was based on animal husbandry, wool, and silk production, augmented more recently by tourism. All baptisms, weddings, and burials are performed at the Catholic Church in Laruns.

Due to its isolated situation, the inhabitants of Goust evolved a curious funeral custom: the deceased was placed in a coffin and sent down the mountainside via a specially-constructed chute, to be collected at the bottom for burial in the Laruns cemetery.

== History ==
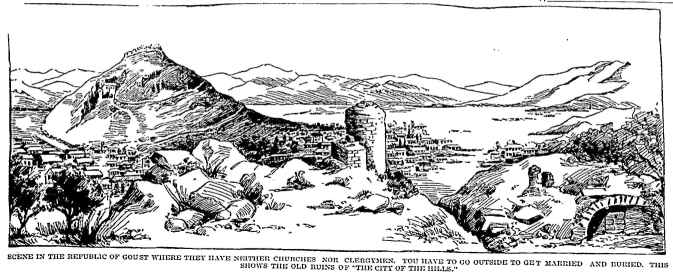
Artist's rendering of Goust and its ruined "City of the Hills" (1899)

Jean-François Samazeuilh (1858) attributes the claims of Goust's independence to an 1827 description by the former French Minister of the Interior Joseph Lainé. Samazeuilh says that Lainé was speaking metaphorically when he labeled Goust a "republic," and that other writers took this literally ("on a pris au sérieux cette fantaisie du spirituel écrivain"). He then provides a long quotation from the Album Pyrénéen which demonstrates the fallacy of this interpretation—for example, the residents of Goust pay taxes to the government in Laruns. In the late 19th century however, newspapers from the United States mention Goust and goings on in the “Republic.” One of them is the story that in 1896 the authorities proclaimed a ban on publication of any newspaper without executive authorization, which led to an uprising of the citizens.

== See also ==
- Longevity claims
