= Principality of Najran =

Historical state in the Arabian Peninsula from 1633 to 1934

- 1633–1934
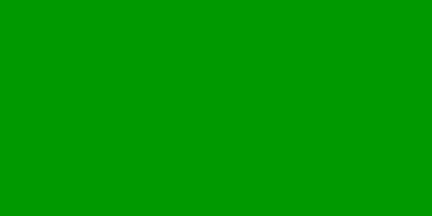
- Flag

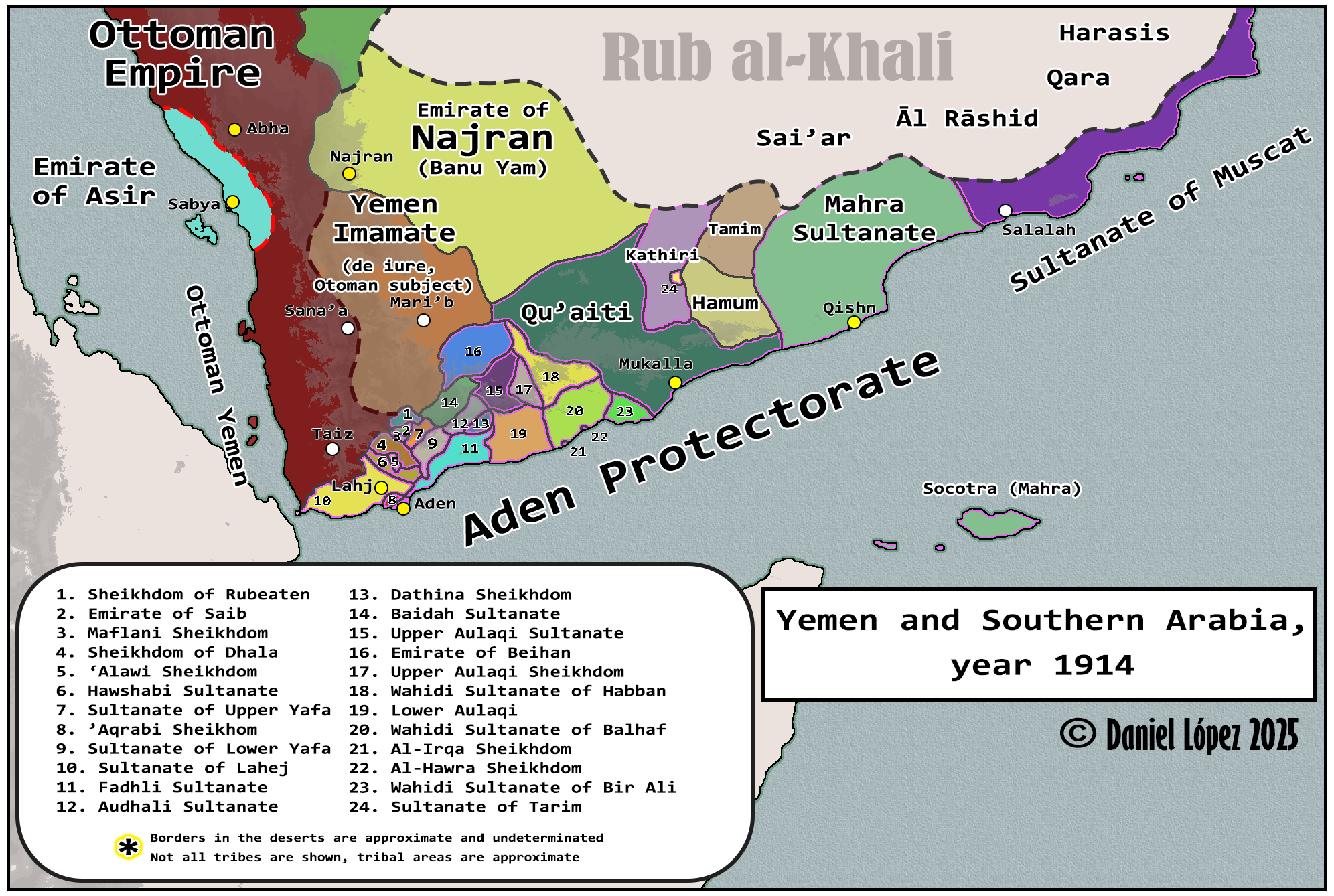
- Najran in 1914
- Capital: Najran
- Common languages: Arabic
- Religion: Ismaili Shia Islam
- Government: Principality
- Da'i
  - 1677–1717: Muhammad ibn Isma'il Al Makrami
  - 1912–1934: Ali bin Muhsin Al Shibami
- History
  - Established: 1633
  - Disestablished: 1934
Preceded by	Succeeded by
Qasimid State	Kingdom of Yemen
- Today part of: Saudi Arabia

The Principality of Najran was a state that existed in the Arabian Peninsula from 1633 to 1934.

== History ==
It originated as an Islamic ecclesiastic principality under Yemeni suzerainty in 1633, although it later came under Ottoman influence, and control as part of the formation of Ottoman Arabia. Najran opposed a Yemeni rebellion against the Ottomans in the 1880s. In the Saudi-Idrisi treaty of 1920, the Emirate of Nejd and Hasa officially laid claim to the territories of Najran, and in 1921 the Ikhwan militia invaded Najran. The Mutawakkilite Kingdom of Yemen also had ambitions in Najran, and thus attempted its own conquest in 1924. In the winter of 1931/1932, Yemeni forces once again attempted to take Najran, but were expelled by the Saudis in 1932. In November 1933, Yemeni forces occupied Najran. In 1934, following the Saudi-Yemeni War, Najran's independence definitively ended when Yemen renounced its claims to Najran and the principality was annexed into Saudi Arabia.
