= Lists of political entities by century =

This is a list of lists of political entities by century.

== 3rd millennium ==
=== 21st century ===
- List of sovereign states in the 2020s
- List of sovereign states in the 2010s
- List of sovereign states in the 2000s

== 2nd millennium by century ==
=== 20th century ===
Sovereign states by decade:

1900s	1910s	1920s	1930s	1940s	1950s	1960s	1970s	1980s	1990s

=== 19th century ===
Sovereign states by decade:

1800s	1810s	1820s	1830s	1840s	1850s	1860s	1870s	1880s	1890s

=== 18th century ===
Sovereign states by year:

1750	1768	1769	1775	1776	1777	1778	1779	1799	1800

=== 17th century ===
Sovereign states by year:

1648	1660	1661	1662

=== 16th century ===
Sovereign states by year:

1528

=== 15th century ===
Sovereign states by year:

1496	1500

=== 11th century ===
- List of political entities in the 11th century

== 1st millennium by century ==
- List of political entities in the 10th century
- List of political entities in the 9th century
- List of political entities in the 8th century
- List of political entities in the 7th century
- List of political entities in the 6th century
- List of political entities in the 5th century
- List of political entities in the 4th century
- List of political entities in the 3rd century
- List of political entities in the 2nd century
- List of political entities in the 1st century

== 1st millennium BC by century ==
- List of political entities in the 1st century BC
- List of political entities in the 2nd century BC
- List of political entities in the 3rd century BC
- List of political entities in the 4th century BC
- List of political entities in the 5th century BC
- List of political entities in the 6th century BC
- List of political entities in the 7th century BC
- List of political entities in the 8th century BC
- List of political entities in the 9th century BC
- List of political entities in the 10th century BC

== 2nd millennium BC by century ==
- List of political entities in the 11th century BC
- List of political entities in the 12th century BC
- List of political entities in the 13th century BC
- List of political entities in the 14th century BC
- List of political entities in the 15th century BC
- List of political entities in the 16th century BC
- List of political entities in the 17th century BC
- List of political entities in the 18th century BC
- List of political entities in the 19th century BC
- List of political entities in the 20th century BC

== 3rd and 4th millennium BC by century ==
- List of political entities in the 21st century BC

== Pre-modern polities by age ==
- List of states during the Middle Ages
  - List of medieval great powers
- List of Classical Age states
  - List of states during Late Antiquity
- List of Iron Age states
- List of Bronze Age states
- List of cities of the ancient Near East
- Copper Age state societies § List of known polities
