= Haasan =

Haasan is a surname. Notable people with the surname include:

- Akshara Haasan, Indian actress who has appeared in Tamil and Hindi-language films
- Kamal Haasan (born 1954), Indian actor, filmmaker, screenwriter, television presenter, politician
- Shruti Haasan (born 1986), Indian actress and singer who works in Tamil, Hindi and Telugu films

== See also ==
- Haas (disambiguation)
- Haasa
- Hassan (disambiguation)
- Hassane
- Hassani (disambiguation)
- Hassaïne (disambiguation)
