= List of sovereign states in the 2020s =

This is a list of sovereign states in the 2020s, giving an overview of states around the world during the period between 1 January 2020 and the present day. It contains 218 entries, arranged alphabetically, with information on the status and recognition of their sovereignty. It includes 195 widely recognized sovereign states, two associated states, 16 states with limited recognition, and 9 entities which either were not fully sovereign or did not claim to be independent.

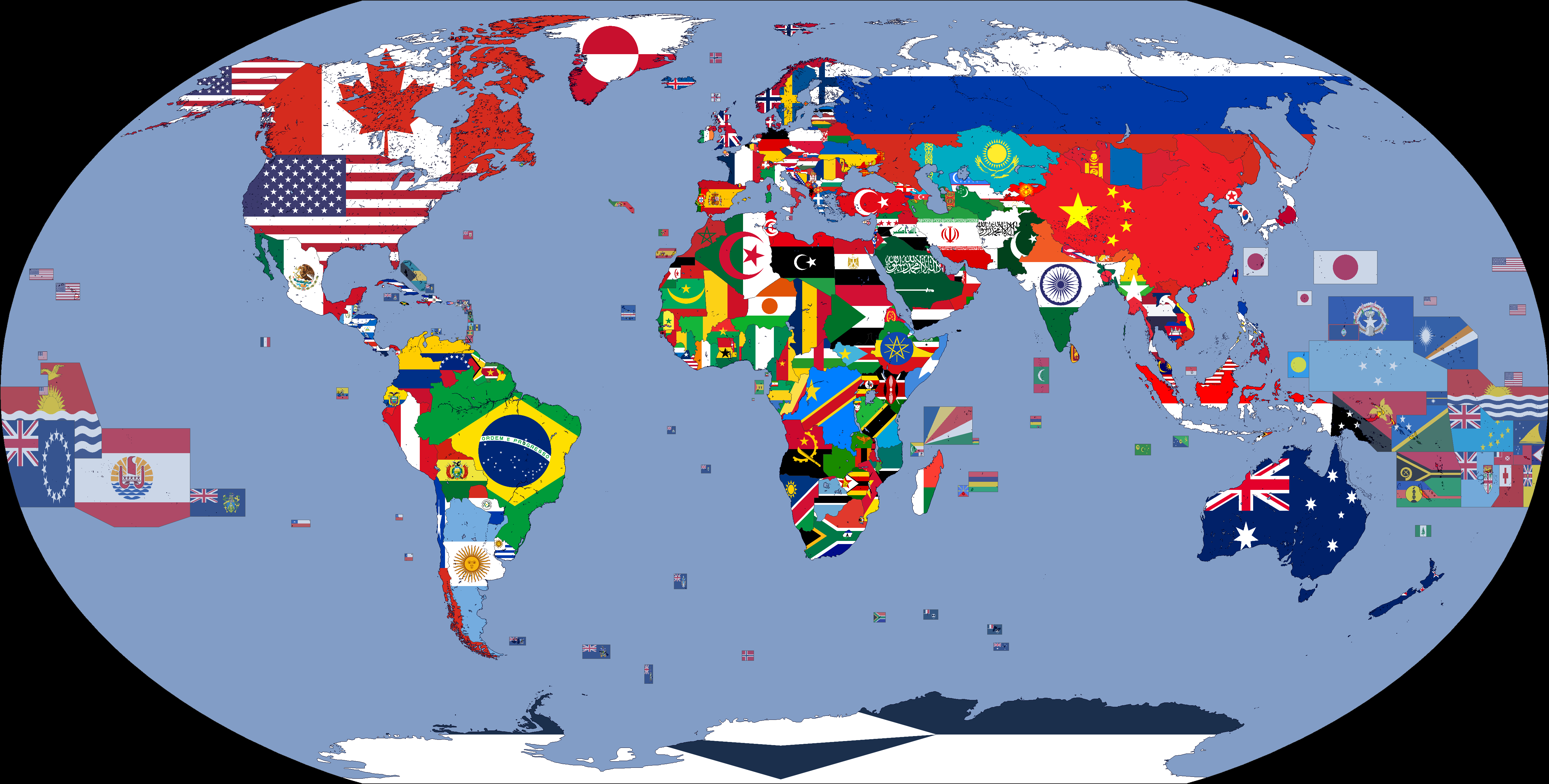
Map of the World in 2026

== Members or observers of the United Nations ==
Name and capital city	Information on status and recognition of sovereignty
=== A ===
Afghanistan – Islamic Republic of Afghanistan (to 15 August 2021); Capital: Kabul	Widely-recognized UN member state. The United Nations continues to recognize the exiled government of the Islamic Republic of Afghanistan as the de jure legitimate government (from 15 August 2021).
Albania – Republic of Albania; Capital: Tirana	Widely recognized UN member state.
Algeria – People's Democratic Republic of Algeria; Capital: Algiers	Widely recognized UN member state.
Andorra – Principality of Andorra; Capital: Andorra la Vella	Widely recognized UN member state. The President of France and Bishop of Urgell were ex officio Co-Princes of Andorra. The defense of Andorra was the responsibility of France and Spain.
Angola – Republic of Angola; Capital: Luanda	Widely recognized UN member state.
Antigua and Barbuda; Capital: St. John's	Widely recognized UN member state and a Commonwealth realm. Antigua and Barbuda had two dependencies, Barbuda and Redonda.
Argentina – Argentine Republic (Note: The name "Argentine Nation" is also used for the purposes of legislation.); Capital: Buenos Aires	Widely recognized UN member state. Argentina was a federation of 23 provinces and an autonomous city. It had a claim over Argentine Antarctica, which was suspended under the Antarctic Treaty. It also claimed the Falkland Islands and South Georgia and the South Sandwich Islands, both of which were British overseas territories.
Armenia – Republic of Armenia; Capital: Yerevan	Widely recognized UN member state. (Note: Armenia was not recognized by Pakistan until 31 August 2025.)
Australia – Commonwealth of Australia; Capital: Canberra	Widely recognized UN member state and a Commonwealth realm. Australia was a federation of six states and three territories. It had sovereignty over the following external territories: Ashmore and Cartier Islands; Australian Antarctic Territory (suspended under the Antarctic Treaty); Christmas Island; Cocos (Keeling) Islands; Coral Sea Islands; Heard Island and McDonald Islands; Norfolk Island
Austria – Republic of Austria; Capital: Vienna	Widely recognized UN member state and an EU member. Austria was a federation of nine states.
Azerbaijan – Republic of Azerbaijan; Capital: Baku	Widely recognized UN member state. Azerbaijan had one autonomous republic, Nakhchivan. It included the disputed region of Nagorno-Karabakh, where a partially recognized breakaway republic had declared independence (to 1 January 2024).
=== B ===
The Bahamas – Commonwealth of the Bahamas; Capital: Nassau	Widely recognized UN member state; Commonwealth realm.
Bahrain – Kingdom of Bahrain; Capital: Manama	Widely recognized UN member state.
Bangladesh – People's Republic of Bangladesh; Capital: Dhaka	Widely recognized UN member state.
Barbados; Capital: Bridgetown	Widely recognized UN member state; Commonwealth realm until 30 November 2021, when it became a republic.
Belarus – Republic of Belarus; Capital: Minsk	Widely recognized UN member state.
Belgium – Kingdom of Belgium; Capital: Brussels	Widely recognized UN member state. EU member. Belgium was a federation of three communities and three regions.
Belize; Capital: Belmopan	Widely recognized UN member state; Commonwealth realm.
Benin – Republic of Benin; Capital: Porto-Novo (official), Cotonou (seat of government)	Widely recognized UN member state.
Bhutan – Kingdom of Bhutan; Capital: Thimphu	Widely recognized UN member state.
Bolivia – Plurinational State of Bolivia; Capital: Sucre (official), La Paz (administrative)	Widely recognized UN member state.
Bosnia and Herzegovina; Capital: Sarajevo	Widely recognized UN member state. Bosnia and Herzegovina was a federation of two constituent entities: the Federation of Bosnia and Herzegovina, which was itself a federation of ten cantons, and Republika Srpska.
Botswana – Republic of Botswana; Capital: Gaborone	Widely recognized UN member state.
Brazil – Federative Republic of Brazil; Capital: Brasília	Widely recognized UN member state. Brazil was a federation of 26 states and one federal district.
Brunei – Nation of Brunei, Abode of Peace; Capital: Bandar Seri Begawan	Widely recognized UN member state. Brunei claimed part of the Spratly Islands (disputed by the People's Republic of China, the Republic of China, Vietnam, the Philippines, and Malaysia).
Bulgaria – Republic of Bulgaria; Capital: Sofia	Widely recognized UN member state. EU member.
Burkina Faso; Capital: Ouagadougou	Widely recognized UN member state.
Burma → Myanmar
Burundi – Republic of Burundi; Capital: Gitega	Widely recognized UN member state.
=== C ===
Cambodia – Kingdom of Cambodia; Capital: Phnom Penh	Widely recognized UN member state.
Cameroon – Republic of Cameroon; Capital: Yaoundé	Widely recognized UN member state.
Canada; Capital: Ottawa	Widely recognized UN member state; Commonwealth realm; Canada was a federation of ten provinces and three territories.
Cape Verde – Republic of Cabo Verde; Capital: Praia	Widely recognized UN member state.
Central African Republic; Capital: Bangui	Widely recognized UN member state.
Chad – Republic of Chad; Capital: N'Djamena	Widely recognized UN member state.
Chile – Republic of Chile; Capital: Santiago	Widely recognized UN member state; Chile had two special territories, Easter Island and the Juan Fernández Islands. It had a claim over Chilean Antarctic Territory, although it was suspended under the Antarctic Treaty.
China – People's Republic of China; Capital: Beijing	Widely recognized UN member state (Note: Both the People's Republic of China and the Republic of China claim to be the sole legitimate government of the entirety of China (including Taiwan). The following states maintain diplomatic relations with the Republic of China instead of the People's Republic of China: Belize, Eswatini, Guatemala, Haiti, Honduras, Marshall Islands, Nauru, Nicaragua, Palau, Paraguay, Saint Kitts and Nevis, Saint Lucia, Saint Vincent and the Grenadines, Tuvalu, and Vatican City.). The People's Republic of China had 22 provinces, four direct controlled municipalities and five autonomous regions: Guangxi, Inner Mongolia, Ningxia, Xinjiang and Tibet. Additionally, it had sovereignty over two special administrative regions: Hong Kong; Macau; The People's Republic of China claimed Taiwan, Penghu, Kinmen, the Matsu Islands, Pratas Island and the Vereker Banks, and Itu Aba, all of which were governed by the Republic of China. It also claimed the Paracel Islands (disputed by the Republic of China and Vietnam), the Spratly Islands (disputed by the Republic of China, Vietnam, the Philippines, Malaysia and Brunei), and South Tibet (controlled by India). The People's Republic of China administered Aksai Chin and the Trans-Karakoram Tract, which were within the disputed region of Kashmir.
Colombia – Republic of Colombia; Capital: Bogotá	Widely recognized UN member state; Colombia administered Serranilla Bank and claimed Bajo Nuevo Bank (disputed by Nicaragua and the United States).
Comoros – Union of the Comoros; Capital: Moroni	Widely recognized UN member state. The Comoros was a federation of three islands autonomous islands: Grande Comore, Mohéli, and Anjouan. Comoros also claimed sovereignty over the French region of Mayotte and the Glorioso Islands. Comoros also claimed Banc du Geyser (disputed by Madagascar and France).
Congo, Democratic Republic of the Capital: Kinshasa	Widely recognized UN member state.
Congo, Republic of the Capital: Brazzaville	Widely recognized UN member state.
Costa Rica – Republic of Costa Rica; Capital: San José	Widely recognized UN member state.
Côte d'Ivoire → Ivory Coast
Croatia – Republic of Croatia; Capital: Zagreb	Widely recognized UN member state and an EU member.
Cuba – Republic of Cuba; Capital: Havana	Widely recognized UN member state. The Cuban region of Guantánamo Bay was under the control of the United States.
Cyprus – Republic of Cyprus; Capital: Nicosia	Widely recognized UN member state; (Note: Cyprus is not recognized by Turkey or Northern Cyprus.) EU member. The northeastern part of the island was the de facto independent state of Northern Cyprus, which was recognized only by Turkey.
Czech Republic; Capital: Prague	Widely recognized UN member state. EU member.
=== D ===
Denmark – Kingdom of Denmark; Capital: Copenhagen	Widely recognized UN member state. EU member. The Kingdom of Denmark also included two autonomous countries: Greenland; Faroe Islands
Djibouti – Republic of Djibouti; Capital: Djibouti	Widely recognized UN member state.
Dominica – Commonwealth of Dominica; Capital: Roseau	Widely recognized UN member state.
Dominican Republic; Capital: Santo Domingo	Widely recognized UN member state.
=== E ===
East Timor (Note: Also known as "Timor-Leste".) – Democratic Republic of Timor-Leste; Capital: Dili	Widely recognized UN member state.
Ecuador – Republic of Ecuador; Capital: Quito	Widely recognized UN member state.
Egypt – Arab Republic of Egypt; Capital: Cairo	Widely recognized UN member state.
El Salvador – Republic of El Salvador; Capital: San Salvador	Widely recognized UN member state.
Equatorial Guinea – Republic of Equatorial Guinea; Capital: Malabo (to 2 January 2026), Ciudad de la Paz (from 2 January 2026)	Widely recognized UN member state.
Eritrea – State of Eritrea; Capital: Asmara	Widely recognized UN member state.
Estonia – Republic of Estonia; Capital: Tallinn	Widely recognized UN member state. EU member.
Eswatini – Kingdom of Eswatini; Capital: Mbabane (administrative), Lobamba (royal and legislative)	Widely recognized UN member state.
Ethiopia – Federal Democratic Republic of Ethiopia; Capital: Addis Ababa	Widely recognized UN member state. Ethiopia was a federation of nine regions and two chartered cities.
=== F ===
Fiji – Republic of Fiji; Capital: Suva	Widely recognized UN member state. Fiji had an autonomous dependency, Rotuma.
Finland – Republic of Finland; Capital: Helsinki	Widely recognized UN member state. EU member. Finland had a neutral and demilitarised region: Åland
→ France – French Republic; Capital: Paris	Widely recognized UN member state. EU member. France included five overseas departments: French Guiana, Guadeloupe, Martinique, Mayotte and Réunion. It also had sovereignty over the following overseas territories: Clipperton Island; French Polynesia; French Southern and Antarctic Lands (including a claim to Adélie Land which was suspended under the Antarctic Treaty.); New Caledonia; Saint-Barthélemy; Saint Martin; Saint Pierre and Miquelon; French Southern and Antarctic Lands (district of Scattered Islands in the Indian Ocean): Bassas da India (disputed by Madagascar); Europa Island (disputed by Madagascar); Glorioso Islands (disputed by Madagascar and Comoros); Juan de Nova Island (disputed by Madagascar); Tromelin Island (disputed by Mauritius); Wallis and Futuna; France also claimed Banc du Geyser (disputed by Madagascar and the Comoros).
=== G ===
Gabon – Gabonese Republic; Capital: Libreville	Widely recognized UN member state.
The Gambia – Republic of the Gambia; Capital: Banjul	Widely recognized UN member state.
Georgia; Capital: Tbilisi	Widely recognized UN member state. Georgia had two autonomous regions, Adjara and Abkhazia; the latter was home to a de facto independent state. Georgia also included the disputed region of South Ossetia, where a partially-recognized breakaway republic had declared independence.
Germany – Federal Republic of Germany; Capital: Berlin	Widely recognized UN member state. EU member. Germany was a federation of sixteen states.
Ghana – Republic of Ghana; Capital: Accra	Widely recognized UN member state.
Greece – Hellenic Republic; Capital: Athens	Widely recognized UN member state. EU member. Greece had sovereignty over Mount Athos, an autonomous monastic state that was jointly governed by the multi-national "Holy Community" on the mountain and the Civil Governor appointed by the Greek Ministry of Foreign Affairs, and spiritually under the direct jurisdiction of the Ecumenical Patriarchate.
Grenada; Capital: St. George's	Widely recognized UN member state; Commonwealth realm. Grenada had one autonomous dependency, Carriacou and Petite Martinique.
Guatemala – Republic of Guatemala; Capital: Guatemala City	Widely recognized UN member state.
Guinea – Republic of Guinea; Capital: Conakry	Widely recognized UN member state.
Guinea-Bissau – Republic of Guinea-Bissau; Capital: Bissau	Widely recognized UN member state.
Guyana – Co-operative Republic of Guyana; Capital: Georgetown	Widely recognized UN member state.
=== H ===
Haiti – Republic of Haiti; Capital: Port-au-Prince	Widely recognized UN member state. Haiti claimed the uninhabited U.S. possession of Navassa Island.
Holy See → Vatican City
→ → Honduras – Republic of Honduras; Capital: Tegucigalpa	Widely recognized UN member state.
Hungary; Capital: Budapest	Widely recognized UN member state. EU member.
=== I ===
Iceland – Republic of Iceland; Capital: Reykjavík	Widely recognized UN member state.
India – Republic of India; Capital: New Delhi	Widely recognized UN member state. India was a federation of twenty-eight states and nine union territories. Indian sovereignty over South Tibet was disputed by China. India administered part of the disputed region of Kashmir as the union territory of Jammu and Kashmir.
Indonesia – Republic of Indonesia; Capital: Jakarta	Widely recognized UN member state. Indonesia had five special provinces: Aceh, Jakarta, Papua, West Papua, and Yogyakarta.
Iran – Islamic Republic of Iran; Capital: Tehran	Widely recognized UN member state.
Iraq – Republic of Iraq; Capital: Baghdad	Widely recognized UN member state. Iraq was constitutionally designated as a federation of autonomous regions, but only one region (Iraqi Kurdistan) had been established.
Ireland (Note: Ireland also had the legal description of "Republic of Ireland", although this is not its constitutional name.); Capital: Dublin	Widely recognized UN member state. EU member.
Israel – State of Israel; Capital: Jerusalem	Widely recognized UN member state. (Note: Israel is not recognized by Afghanistan, Algeria, Bangladesh, Brunei, Comoros, Cuba, Djibouti, Indonesia, Iran, Iraq, Kuwait, Lebanon, Libya, Malaysia, Maldives, Mali, Mauritania, Niger, North Korea, Oman, Pakistan, Qatar, Saudi Arabia, Somalia, Syria, Tunisia, Venezuela, or Yemen.) Israel occupied East Jerusalem, the Gaza Strip, the Golan Heights, and the West Bank. These areas were not generally recognized as being part of Israel.
Italy – Italian Republic; Capital: Rome	Widely recognized UN member state. EU member. Italy had 5 autonomous regions, Aosta Valley, Friuli-Venezia Giulia, Sardinia, Sicily, and Trentino-Alto Adige/Südtirol.
Ivory Coast – Republic of Côte d'Ivoire; Capital: Yamoussoukro (official), Abidjan (seat of government)	Widely recognized UN member state.
=== J ===
Jamaica; Capital: Kingston	Widely recognized UN member state; Commonwealth realm.
Japan; Capital: Tokyo	Widely recognized UN member state. Its claim over the Liancourt Rocks was disputed by North Korea and South Korea. Its claim over Iturup, Kunashir, Shikotan, and the Habomai Islands was disputed by Russia.
Jordan – Hashemite Kingdom of Jordan; Capital: Amman	Widely recognized UN member state.
=== K ===
Kazakhstan – Republic of Kazakhstan; Capital: Nur-Sultan (renamed Astana on 13 September 2022)	Widely recognized UN member state.
Kenya – Republic of Kenya; Capital: Nairobi	Widely recognized UN member state.
Kiribati – Republic of Kiribati; Capital: South Tarawa	Widely recognized UN member state.
Korea, North – Democratic People's Republic of Korea; Capital: Pyongyang	Widely recognized UN member state. (Note: North Korea is not recognized by Taiwan, Estonia, France, Japan, or South Korea.) It claimed to be the sole legitimate government of Korea and its claim over the Liancourt Rocks was disputed by South Korea and Japan.
Korea, South – Republic of Korea; Capital: Seoul	Widely recognized UN member state. (Note: South Korea is not recognized by North Korea.) South Korea had one autonomous region, Jeju. It claimed to be the sole legitimate government of Korea and its claim over the Liancourt Rocks was disputed by North Korea and Japan.
Kuwait – State of Kuwait; Capital: Kuwait City	Widely recognized UN member state.
→ Kyrgyzstan – Kyrgyz Republic; Capital: Bishkek	Widely-recognized UN member state.
=== L ===
Laos – Lao People's Democratic Republic; Capital: Vientiane	Widely recognized UN member state.
Latvia – Republic of Latvia; Capital: Riga	Widely recognized UN member state. EU member.
Lebanon – Lebanese Republic; Capital: Beirut	Widely recognized UN member state.
Lesotho – Kingdom of Lesotho; Capital: Maseru	Widely recognized UN member state.
Liberia – Republic of Liberia; Capital: Monrovia	Widely recognized UN member state.
Libya – State of Libya; Capital: Tripoli	Widely recognized UN member state.
Liechtenstein – Principality of Liechtenstein; Capital: Vaduz	Widely recognized UN member state. The defense of Liechtenstein was the responsibility of Switzerland.
Lithuania – Republic of Lithuania; Capital: Vilnius	Widely recognized UN member state. EU member.
Luxembourg – Grand Duchy of Luxembourg; Capital: Luxembourg	Widely recognized UN member state. EU member.
=== M ===
Madagascar – Republic of Madagascar; Capital: Antananarivo	Widely recognized UN member state. Madagascar claimed the French possessions of Bassas da India, Europa Island, Glorioso Islands and Juan de Nova Island. It also claimed Banc du Geyser (disputed by Comoros and France).
Malawi – Republic of Malawi; Capital: Lilongwe	Widely recognized UN member state.
Malaysia; Capital: Kuala Lumpur (official), Putrajaya (administrative)	Widely recognized UN member state. Malaysia was a federation of thirteen states and three federal territories. Malaysia claimed part of the Spratly Islands (disputed by China, Taiwan, Vietnam, the Philippines, and Brunei).
Maldives – Republic of Maldives; Capital: Malé	Widely recognized UN member state.
Mali – Republic of Mali; Capital: Bamako	Widely recognized UN member state.
Malta – Republic of Malta; Capital: Valletta	Widely recognized UN member state. EU member.
Marshall Islands – Republic of the Marshall Islands; Capital: Majuro	Widely recognized UN member state under Compact of Free Association with the United States. The Marshall Islands claimed the United States territory of Wake Island.
Mauritania – Islamic Republic of Mauritania; Capital: Nouakchott	Widely recognized UN member state.
Mauritius – Republic of Mauritius; Capital: Port Louis	Widely recognized UN member state. Mauritius had one autonomous dependency, Rodrigues, and two other dependencies, Agalega Islands and Cargados Carajos. It claimed the British Indian Ocean Territory (until its sovereignty was transferred to Mauritius in 2025) and the French territory of Tromelin Island.
Mexico – United Mexican States; Capital: Mexico City	Widely recognized UN member state. Mexico was a federation of 31 states and one federal district.
(Federated States of Micronesia) Micronesia, Federated States of Capital: Palikir	Widely recognized UN member state under Compact of Free Association with the United States. The FSM was a federation of four states.
Moldova – Republic of Moldova; Capital: Chişinău	Widely recognized UN member state. Moldova had two autonomous territorial units, Gagauzia and Transnistria; the latter was controlled by a de facto independent state.
Monaco – Principality of Monaco; Capital: Monaco	Widely recognized UN member state. The defense of Monaco was the responsibility of France.
Mongolia; Capital: Ulaanbaatar	Widely recognized UN member state.
Montenegro; Capital: Podgorica	Widely recognized UN member state.
Morocco – Kingdom of Morocco; Capital: Rabat	Widely recognized UN member state. Morocco claimed sovereignty over Western Sahara, which was disputed and partially controlled by the de facto independent Sahrawi Arab Democratic Republic. Morocco disputed Spanish sovereignty over Ceuta, Isla de Alborán, Isla Perejil, Islas Chafarinas, Melilla, and Peñón de Alhucemas.
Mozambique – Republic of Mozambique; Capital: Maputo	Widely recognized UN member state.
Myanmar (Note: Commonly known in English as "Burma".) – Republic of the Union of Myanmar; Capital: Naypyidaw	Widely recognized UN member state.
=== N ===
Namibia – Republic of Namibia; Capital: Windhoek	Widely recognized UN member state.
Nauru – Republic of Naoero; Capital: Yaren (unofficial, seat of parliament): Republic of Nauru (to 26 June 2026); Republic of Naoero (from 26 June 2026)	Widely recognized UN member state. The defense of Nauru was the responsibility of Australia.
Nepal – Federal Democratic Republic of Nepal; Capital: Kathmandu	Widely recognized UN member state. Nepal was a federation of seven provinces.
(Kingdom of the Netherlands) Netherlands – Kingdom of the Netherlands; Capital: Amsterdam (official), The Hague (seat of government)	Widely recognized UN member state. The Kingdom of the Netherlands consisted of four autonomous countries: Aruba; Netherlands; Curaçao; Sint Maarten; It also had sovereignty over one non-autonomous region (consisting of three special municipalities that are part of the Netherlands): Caribbean Netherlands; The Kingdom of the Netherlands, excluding Aruba, Curaçao, Sint Maarten, and the Caribbean Netherlands, was a member of the EU.
New Zealand; Capital: Wellington	Widely recognized UN member state; Commonwealth realm. New Zealand had responsibilities for the two free associated states of: Cook Islands; Niue; It also had sovereignty over two dependent territories: Ross Dependency (suspended under the Antarctic Treaty); Tokelau; The government of Tokelau claimed Swains Island, part of American Samoa (an unincorporated territory of the United States). New Zealand did not recognize this claim.
Nicaragua – Republic of Nicaragua; Capital: Managua	Widely recognized UN member state. Nicaragua had two autonomous regions: the North Caribbean Coast Autonomous Region and South Caribbean Coast Autonomous Region.
Niger – Republic of Niger; Capital: Niamey	Widely recognized UN member state.
Nigeria – Federal Republic of Nigeria; Capital: Abuja	Widely recognized UN member state. Nigeria was a federation of 36 states and one federal territory.
North Macedonia – Republic of North Macedonia; Capital: Skopje	Widely recognized UN member state.
Norway – Kingdom of Norway; Capital: Oslo	Widely recognized UN member state. Norway had two integral overseas areas: Jan Mayen and Svalbard. The latter had a special status due to the Spitsbergen Treaty. Norway had sovereignty over the following dependencies: Bouvet Island; Peter I Island (suspended under the Antarctic Treaty); Queen Maud Land (suspended under the Antarctic Treaty)
=== O ===
Oman – Sultanate of Oman; Capital: Muscat	Widely recognized UN member state.
=== P ===
Pakistan – Islamic Republic of Pakistan; Capital: Islamabad	Widely recognized UN member state. Pakistan was a federation of four provinces and four territories. It administered part of the disputed region of Kashmir as the territories of Azad Kashmir and the autonomous territory of Gilgit-Baltistan.
Palau – Republic of Palau; Capital: Ngerulmud	Widely recognized UN member state under a Compact of Free Association with the United States.
Palestine – State of Palestine; Capital: Ramallah (administrative), Gaza City (administrative), Jerusalem (claims)	Partially-recognised de facto self-governing entity. (Note: Palestine is recognized by Afghanistan, Albania, Algeria, Angola, Antigua and Barbuda, Argentina, Azerbaijan, Bahrain, Bangladesh, Belarus, Belize, Benin, Bhutan, Bolivia, Bosnia and Herzegovina, Botswana, Brazil, Brunei, Bulgaria, Burkina Faso, Burundi, Cambodia, Cape Verde, Chad, the Central African Republic, Chile, China, Comoros, the Democratic Republic of the Congo, the Republic of the Congo, Costa Rica, Côte d'Ivoire, Cuba, Cyprus, Czech Republic, Djibouti, Dominica, the Dominican Republic, East Timor, Ecuador, Egypt, El Salvador, Equatorial Guinea, Eswatini, Ethiopia, Gabon, Gambia, Georgia, Ghana, Grenada, Guatemala, Guinea, Guinea-Bissau, Guyana, Haiti, Holy See, Honduras, Hungary, Iceland, India, Indonesia, Iraq, Iran, Jordan, Kazakhstan, Kenya, Kuwait, Kyrgyzstan, Laos, Lebanon, Lesotho, Liberia, Libya, Madagascar, Malawi, Malaysia, Maldives, Mali, Malta, Mauritania, Mauritius, Mongolia, Montenegro, Morocco, Mozambique, Namibia, Nepal, Nicaragua, Niger, Nigeria, North Korea, Oman, Pakistan, Papua New Guinea, Paraguay, Peru, the Philippines, Poland, Qatar, Romania, Russia, Rwanda, Saint Lucia, Saint Vincent and the Grenadines, São Tomé and Príncipe, Saudi Arabia, Senegal, Serbia, Seychelles, Sierra Leone, Slovakia, Somalia, South Africa, Sri Lanka, Sudan, Suriname, Sweden, Syria, Tajikistan, Tanzania, Thailand, Togo, Tunisia, Turkey, Turkmenistan, Uganda, Ukraine, the United Arab Emirates, Uruguay, Uzbekistan, Vanuatu, Venezuela, Vietnam, Yemen, Zambia, and Zimbabwe.) Palestine claimed sovereignty over a disputed region consisting of three Israeli-occupied territories: the West Bank, the Gaza Strip, and East Jerusalem. Palestine was a non-member observer state of the United Nations General Assembly. The Palestinian National Authority was an interim administrative body that exercised limited control over parts of the West Bank and the Gaza Strip. Gaza was under the control of Hamas.
Panama – Republic of Panama; Capital: Panama City	Widely recognized UN member state.
Papua New Guinea – Independent State of Papua New Guinea; Capital: Port Moresby	Widely recognized UN member state; Commonwealth realm. Papua New Guinea had one autonomous region, Bougainville.
Paraguay – Republic of Paraguay; Capital: Asunción	Widely recognized UN member state.
Peru – Republic of Peru; Capital: Lima	Widely recognized UN member state.
Philippines – Republic of the Philippines; Capital: Manila	Widely recognized UN member state. The Philippines had one autonomous region, Bangsamoro. The Philippines administered Scarborough Shoal, which was disputed by the People's Republic of China and the Republic of China. It also claimed sovereignty over the Spratly Islands (disputed by China, Taiwan, Vietnam, Brunei, and Malaysia) and the Malaysian territory of Sabah.
Poland – Republic of Poland; Capital: Warsaw	Widely recognized UN member state. EU member.
Portugal – Portuguese Republic; Capital: Lisbon	Widely recognized UN member state. EU member. Portugal had two autonomous regions: the Azores and Madeira. Portugal claimed the Spanish municipalities of Olivenza and Táliga.
=== Q ===
Qatar – State of Qatar; Capital: Doha	Widely recognized UN member state.
=== R ===
Romania; Capital: Bucharest	Widely recognized UN member state. EU member.
Russia – Russian Federation; Capital: Moscow	Widely recognized UN member state and a permanent member of the UN Security Council. Russia was a federation of 22 republics, 46 oblasts, 9 krais, 3 federal cities, 1 autonomous oblast, and 4 autonomous okrugs. Its claim over Iturup, Kunashir, Shikotan, and the Habomai Islands was disputed by Japan and its claim over Crimea, Donetsk Oblast, Kherson Oblast, Luhansk Oblast and Zaporizhzhia Oblast was disputed by Ukraine.
Rwanda – Republic of Rwanda; Capital: Kigali	Widely recognized UN member state.
=== S ===
Saint Kitts and Nevis – Federation of Saint Christopher and Nevis; Capital: Basseterre	Widely recognized UN member state; Commonwealth realm. Saint Kitts and Nevis was a federation of fourteen parishes on two islands. It had one autonomous island, Nevis.
Saint Lucia; Capital: Castries	Widely recognized UN member state and a Commonwealth realm.
Saint Vincent and the Grenadines; Capital: Kingstown	Widely recognized UN member state; Commonwealth realm.
Samoa – Independent State of Samoa; Capital: Apia	Widely recognized UN member state.
San Marino – Republic of San Marino; Capital: San Marino	Widely recognized UN member state.
São Tomé and Príncipe – Democratic Republic of São Tomé and Príncipe; Capital: São Tomé	Widely recognized UN member state; São Tomé and Príncipe had one autonomous province, Príncipe.
Saudi Arabia – Kingdom of Saudi Arabia; Capital: Riyadh	Widely recognized UN member state.
Senegal – Republic of Senegal; Capital: Dakar	Widely recognized UN member state.
Serbia – Republic of Serbia; Capital: Belgrade	Widely recognized UN member state. Serbia claimed two autonomous provinces, Vojvodina and Kosovo and Metohija, with the latter controlled by a partially-recognized de facto independent state.
Seychelles – Republic of Seychelles; Capital: Victoria	Widely recognized UN member state. The Seychelles claimed the British Indian Ocean Territory.
Sierra Leone – Republic of Sierra Leone; Capital: Freetown	Widely recognized UN member state.
Singapore – Republic of Singapore; Capital: Singapore	Widely recognized UN member state.
Slovakia – Slovak Republic; Capital: Bratislava	Widely recognized UN member state. EU member.
Slovenia – Republic of Slovenia; Capital: Ljubljana	Widely recognized UN member state. EU member.
Solomon Islands; Capital: Honiara	Widely recognized UN member state; Commonwealth realm.
Somalia – Federal Republic of Somalia; Capital: Mogadishu	Widely recognized UN member state. Several autonomous regional governments existed in the de jure territory of Somalia. Although the following entities did not claim independence from Somalia, they were de facto self-governing: Ahlu Sunna Waljama'a; Islamic Wilayaat of Somalia; Galmudug; Jubaland; Puntland; South West State of Somalia (17 – 30 March 2026); There were also areas of the country that at various times had no effective government at all, or which were ruled by local clans. In addition, one state, Somaliland, had declared and established de facto independence from Somalia.
South Africa – Republic of South Africa; Capital: Pretoria (administrative), Cape Town (legislative), Bloemfontein (judicial)	Widely recognized UN member state.
→ South Sudan – Republic of South Sudan; Capital: Juba	Widely recognized UN member state. South Sudan was a federation of 10 states (32 states to 22 February 2020). It disputed Abyei with Sudan.
Spain – Kingdom of Spain; Capital: Madrid	Widely recognized UN member state and an EU member. Spain was divided into seventeen autonomous communities and two autonomous cities. Its sovereignty over Ceuta, Isla de Alborán, Isla Perejil, Islas Chafarinas, Melilla and Peñón de Alhucemas was disputed by Morocco. Its sovereignty over Olivenza and Táliga was disputed by Portugal. It claimed the British overseas territory of Gibraltar.
Sri Lanka – Democratic Socialist Republic of Sri Lanka; Capital: Sri Jayawardenapura-Kotte (administrative), Colombo (commercial)	Widely recognized UN member state.
Sudan – Republic of the Sudan; Capital: Khartoum	Widely recognized UN member state; Sudan was a federation of 18 states. Sovereignty over Abyei was disputed with South Sudan.
Suriname – Republic of Suriname; Capital: Paramaribo	Widely recognized UN member state.
Swaziland → Eswatini
Sweden – Kingdom of Sweden; Capital: Stockholm	Widely recognized UN member state. EU member.
Switzerland – Swiss Confederation; Capital: Bern	Widely recognized UN member state. Switzerland was a federation of 26 cantons.
→ Syria; Capital: Damascus: Syrian Arab Republic (Ba'athist Syria) (to 8 December 2024); Syrian Arab Republic (Syrian caretaker government) (from 9 December 2024 to 29 March 2025); Syrian Arab Republic (Syrian transitional government) (since 29 March 2025)	Widely recognized UN member state. Control passed due to civil war on 8 December 2024. Syria included the Golan Heights, which were occupied by Israel. It disputed the Turkish sovereignty over Hatay Province (to 8 December 2024).
=== T ===
Tajikistan – Republic of Tajikistan; Capital: Dushanbe	Widely recognized UN member state; Tajikistan had one autonomous province, Gorno-Badakhshan.
Tanzania – United Republic of Tanzania; Capital: Dodoma (official), Dar es Salaam (seat of government)	Widely recognized UN member state; Tanzania had one autonomous region, Zanzibar.
Thailand – Kingdom of Thailand; Capital: Bangkok	Widely recognized UN member state.
Timor-Leste → East Timor
Togo – Togolese Republic; Capital: Lomé	Widely recognized UN member state.
Tonga – Kingdom of Tonga; Capital: Nuku'alofa	Widely recognized UN member state.
Trinidad and Tobago – Republic of Trinidad and Tobago; Capital: Port of Spain	Widely recognized UN member state; Trinidad and Tobago had one autonomous island, Tobago.
Tunisia – Republic of Tunisia; Capital: Tunis	Widely recognized UN member state.
Turkey; Capital: Ankara: Republic of Turkey (to 1 June 2022); Republic of Türkiye (from 1 June 2022)	Widely recognized UN member state.
Turkmenistan; Capital: Ashgabat	Widely recognized UN member state.
Tuvalu; Capital: Funafuti	Widely recognized UN member state; Commonwealth realm.
=== U ===
Uganda – Republic of Uganda; Capital: Kampala	Widely recognized UN member state.
Ukraine; Capital: Kyiv	Widely recognized UN member state; Ukraine had one autonomous republic, Crimea. Crimea and the city of Sevastopol were under de facto Russian control, and Donetsk Oblast, Kherson Oblast, Luhansk Oblast and Zaporizhzhia Oblast were claimed by Russia beginning in 2022.
United Arab Emirates; Capital: Abu Dhabi	Widely recognized UN member state; the United Arab Emirates was a federation of seven emirates.
United Kingdom – United Kingdom of Great Britain and Northern Ireland; Capital: London	Widely recognized UN member state; Commonwealth realm. EU member (to 31 January 2020). The United Kingdom was composed of four "countries": England, Northern Ireland, Scotland, and Wales. It had sovereignty over the following British overseas territories: Anguilla; Bermuda; British Antarctic Territory (suspended under the Antarctic Treaty); British Indian Ocean Territory (disputed by Mauritius); British Virgin Islands; Cayman Islands; Falkland Islands (disputed by Argentina); Gibraltar (disputed by Spain); Montserrat; Pitcairn Islands; Saint Helena, Ascension and Tristan da Cunha; South Georgia and the South Sandwich Islands (disputed by Argentina); Sovereign Base Areas of Akrotiri and Dhekelia; Turks and Caicos Islands; In addition, the British Monarch (not the United Kingdom) had direct sovereignty over three self-governing Crown dependencies: Guernsey, with two dependencies: Alderney; Sark; Isle of Man; Jersey
United States – United States of America; Capital: Washington, DC	Widely recognized UN member state. The United States was a federation of 50 states, one federal district, and one incorporated territory. It asserted sovereignty over the following inhabited insular areas: American Samoa (including Swains Island, which was disputed by Tokelau); Guam; Northern Mariana Islands; Puerto Rico; United States Virgin Islands; It also had sovereignty over eight uninhabited unincorporated territories, which are sometimes designated for statistical purposes as the United States Minor Outlying Islands: Baker Island; Howland Island; Jarvis Island; Johnston Atoll; Kingman Reef; Midway Atoll; Navassa Island (claims by Haiti); Wake Island (claims by the Marshall Islands); The United States claimed Bajo Nuevo Bank and Serranilla Bank. Its claim to Serranilla was disputed by Colombia and Nicaragua and its claim to Bajo Nuevo was disputed by Colombia, Jamaica, and Nicaragua. Some government sources stated that these two areas were unincorporated territories of the United States.
Uruguay – Oriental Republic of Uruguay; Capital: Montevideo	Widely recognized UN member state.
Uzbekistan – Republic of Uzbekistan; Capital: Tashkent	Widely recognized UN member state. Uzbekistan had one autonomous republic, Karakalpakstan.
=== V ===
Vanuatu – Republic of Vanuatu; Capital: Port Vila	Widely recognized UN member state.
→ Vatican City – Vatican City State; Capital: Vatican City	Widely recognized independent state. Vatican City was administered by the Holy See, a sovereign entity recognized by a large number of countries and a non-member observer state of the United Nations General Assembly. The Holy See also administered a number of extraterritorial properties in Italy. The Pope was the ex officio head of state of Vatican City.
Venezuela – Bolivarian Republic of Venezuela; Capital: Caracas	Widely recognized UN member state. Venezuela was a federation of 23 states, one federal dependency, and one federal district.
Vietnam – Socialist Republic of Vietnam; Capital: Hanoi	Widely recognized UN member state. Vietnam claimed sovereignty over the Paracel Islands (disputed by China and Taiwan) and Spratly Islands (disputed by China, Taiwan, Brunei, the Philippines, and Malaysia).
=== Y ===
Yemen – Republic of Yemen; Capital: Sana'a	Widely recognized UN member state. It faced two civil wars: The Islamist, Iranian-backed Houthi movement; The socialist, UAE-backed Southern Movement
=== Z ===
Zambia – Republic of Zambia; Capital: Lusaka	Widely recognized UN member state.
Zimbabwe – Republic of Zimbabwe; Capital: Harare	Widely recognized UN member state.

== Non-UN members or observers ==
Name and capital city	Information on status and recognition of sovereignty
Abkhazia – Republic of Abkhazia; Capital: Sukhumi	Partially-recognized de facto self-governing entity. (Note: Abkhazia is recognized by six UN member states (Russia, Syria, Nicaragua, Venezuela, Nauru, and Vanuatu), and two non-UN member states (South Ossetia and Transnistria).) Claimed by Georgia.
Afghanistan – Islamic Emirate of Afghanistan (from 15 August 2021); Capital: Kabul	De facto ruling government of Afghanistan from 15 August 2021. It is only recognized by Russia. The United Nations continues to recognize the exiled government of the Islamic Republic of Afghanistan as the de jure legitimate government.
Artsakh – Republic of Artsakh (to 28 September 2023); Capital: Stepanakert	De facto self-governing entity (to 28 September 2023). It was not recognized by any other state and was claimed by Azerbaijan.
Cook Islands; Capital: Avarua	A state in free association with New Zealand, recognized by Japan, Netherlands, and China. The Cook Islands was a member of multiple UN agencies with full treaty making capacity. It shared a head of state and citizenship with New Zealand.
Donetsk – Donetsk People's Republic (to 30 September 2022); Capital: Donetsk	Partially-recognized de facto self-governing entity. (Note: Donetsk People's Republic was recognized by three UN member states (Russia (from 21 February 2022), Syria and North Korea) and two non-UN member states (Luhansk People's Republic and South Ossetia).) Claimed by Ukraine as part of the Donetsk Oblast. Annexed by Russia on 30 September 2022.
(Libya) Government of National Stability (from 3 March 2022)	Parallel government Formed by the Libyan House of Representatives in March 2022 in opposition to the Government of National Unity appointed by the Libyan Presidential Council. Based in Tobruk and controls most of eastern Libya.
(Sudan) Government of Peace and Unity (from 15 April 2025)	Parallel government established in April 2025 to administer areas of Sudan controlled by the Rapid Support Forces (RSF) and allied groups during the Sudanese Civil War, in opposition to the transitional cabinet appointed by the Transitional Sovereignty Council.
Kherson (from 29 September 2022 to 30 September 2022); Capital: Kherson	Partially-recognized de facto self-governing entity. (Note: Kherson was recognized only by Russia.) Claimed by Ukraine as the Kherson Oblast. Annexed by Russia on 30 September 2022.
Kosovo – Republic of Kosovo; Capital: Pristina	Partially-recognized de facto self-governing entity. (Note: Kosovo is recognized by Afghanistan, Albania, Andorra, Antigua and Barbuda, Australia, Austria, Bahrain, Bangladesh, Belgium, Belize, Benin, Brunei, Bulgaria, Burkina Faso, Burundi, Canada, Central African Republic, Chad, Colombia, Comoros, Cook Islands, Costa Rica, Croatia, the Czech Republic, Denmark, Djibouti, Dominica, Dominican Republic, Egypt, El Salvador, Estonia, Eswatini, Fiji, Finland, France, Gabon, the Gambia, Germany, Ghana, Grenada, Guinea-Bissau, Guyana, Haiti, Honduras, Hungary, Iceland, Ireland, Italy, Ivory Coast, Japan, Jordan, Kiribati, Kuwait, Latvia, Lesotho, Liberia, Libya, Liechtenstein, Lithuania, Luxembourg, Malawi, Malaysia, Maldives, Malta, Marshall Islands, Mauritania, Micronesia, Monaco, Montenegro, Nauru, Netherlands, New Zealand, Niger, Niue, North Macedonia, Norway, Oman, Palau, Pakistan, Panama, Papua New Guinea, Peru, Poland, Portugal, Qatar, Saint Kitts and Nevis, Saint Lucia, Samoa, San Marino, Saudi Arabia, Senegal, Sierra Leone, Singapore, Slovenia, the Solomon Islands, Somalia, South Korea, Suriname, Sweden, Switzerland, Taiwan, Tanzania, Thailand, Timor-Leste, Togo, Tonga, Turkey, Tuvalu, the United Arab Emirates, the United Kingdom, the United States, Vanuatu, and Yemen.) Claimed by Serbia as the Autonomous Province of Kosovo and Metohija.
Luhansk – Luhansk People's Republic (to 30 September 2022); Capital: Luhansk	Partially-recognized de facto self-governing entity. (Note: Luhansk People's Republic was recognized by three UN member states (Russia (from 21 February 2022), Syria and North Korea) and two non-UN member states (Donetsk People's Republic and South Ossetia).) Claimed by Ukraine as part of the Luhansk Oblast. Annexed by Russia on 30 September 2022.
Niue; Capital: Alofi	A state in free association with New Zealand, recognized by China. Niue was a member of multiple UN agencies with full treaty making capacity. It shared a head of state and citizenship with New Zealand.
Northern Cyprus – Turkish Republic of Northern Cyprus; Capital: Lefkoşa	Partially-recognized de facto self-governing entity. (Note: Northern Cyprus is recognized only by Turkey.) Claimed by Cyprus.
Sahrawi Arab Democratic Republic; Capital: Tifariti (temporary), El Aaiún (claimed)	Partially-recognized de facto self-governing entity. (Note: the Sahrawi Arab Democratic Republic is recognized by Algeria, Angola, Antigua and Barbuda, Barbados, Belize, Bolivia, Botswana, Burundi, Cambodia, Chad, Colombia, Costa Rica, Cuba, Dominica, the Dominican Republic, Ecuador, Ethiopia, Ghana, Grenada, Guatemala, Guinea-Bissau, Guyana, Haiti, Honduras, Iran, Jamaica, Laos, Lesotho, Libya, Madagascar, Mali, Malawi, Mauritania, Mauritius, Mexico, Mozambique, Namibia, Nicaragua, Nigeria, North Korea, Panama, Papua New Guinea, Paraguay, Rwanda, Saint Kitts and Nevis, Saint Lucia, Saint Vincent and the Grenadines, Sierra Leone, South Africa, Suriname, Syria, Tanzania, Timor-Leste, Trinidad and Tobago, Uganda, Uruguay, Vanuatu, Venezuela, Vietnam, Zambia, Zimbabwe.) The Sahrawi Arab Democratic Republic claimed the disputed territory of Western Sahara, most of which was under control of Morocco. The territories under its control, the so-called Free Zone, were claimed by Morocco. Its government resided in exile in Tindouf, Algeria.
Somaliland – Republic of Somaliland; Capital: Hargeisa	De facto self-governing entity. It is only recognized by Israel. Claimed by Somalia.
South Ossetia – Republic of South Ossetia; Capital: Tskhinvali	Partially-recognized de facto independent state. (Note: South Ossetia is recognized by five UN member states (Russia, Syria, Nicaragua, Venezuela, and Nauru), and three non-UN member states (Abkhazia, Transnistria, and the Sahrawi Arab Democratic Republic).) Claimed by Georgia as the Provisional Administrative Entity of South Ossetia.
Taiwan – Republic of China; Capital: Taipei (seat of government), Nanjing (claimed)	Partially-recognized de facto independent state but de jure widely recognized UN member state. The Republic of China claimed to be the sole legitimate government of China, but only administered Taiwan, Penghu, Kinmen, the Matsu Islands, Pratas Island and Itu Aba (collectively known as the "free area"). The Republic of China had territorial claims over Mongolia; the Russian republic of Tuva; the Sixty-Four Villages East of the River (administered by Russia); The majority of Gorno-Badakhshan (administered by Tajikistan); The eastern tip of the Wakhan Corridor (administered by Afghanistan); a small portion of Gilgit-Baltistan (administered by Pakistan and part of the disputed Kashmir region); Aksai Chin (administered by the People's Republic of China and part of the disputed Kashmir region); eastern Bhutan; South Tibet (controlled by India); and Kachin State (administered by Myanmar). Territories controlled by the Republic of China were de facto claimed by the People's Republic of China.
Transnistria – Pridnestrovian Moldavian Republic; Capital: Tiraspol	Partially-recognized de facto self-governing entity. (Note: Transnistria is recognized by Abkhazia and South Ossetia.) Claimed by Moldova.
Zaporozhye (from 29 September 2022 to 30 September 2022); Capital: Melitopol (temporary), Zaporozhye (claimed)	Partially-recognized de facto self-governing entity. (Note: Zaporozhye was recognized only by Russia.) Claimed by Ukraine as the Zaporizhzhia Oblast. Annexed by Russia on 30 September 2022.

== Other entities ==
Excluded from the list above are the following noteworthy entities which either were not fully sovereign or did not claim to be independent:

- Antarctica, as a whole, has no government and no permanent population. Seven states claim portions of Antarctica and five of these reciprocally recognize one another's claims. These claims, which were regulated by the Antarctic Treaty System, were neither recognised nor disputed by any other signatory state.
- The Capitol Hill Autonomous Zone (CHAZ) was a de facto self-governing proto-statelet that existed from 8 June 2020 to 1 July 2020 (effectively controlling the Cal Anderson Park in Seattle's Capitol Hill district and a portion of its immediate surrounding environs), though it was not recognized by any other state. Claimed by the United States as part of the State of Washington's King County.
- The Democratic Autonomous Administration of North and East Syria was a de facto autonomous region in northeastern Syria lasting until 20 August 2026. It consisted of self-governing sub-regions in the areas of Jazira and Euphrates. Until the January 2026 northeastern Syria offensive, it also included the regions of Raqqa, Tabqa, and Deir ez-Zor.
- The European Union is a sui generis supranational organization that had 27 member states (28 members until 31 January 2020). The member states transferred a measure of their legislative, executive, and judicial powers to the institutions of the EU, and as such the EU had some elements of sovereignty, without generally being considered a sovereign state. The European Union did not claim to be a sovereign state and had only limited capacity for relations with other states.
- The Islamic State (IS) is a proto-state and insurgent found in many nations throughout Asia and Africa. (Note: The Islamic State controls territory in Burkina Faso, Iraq, Mali, Mozambique, Niger, Nigeria, Somalia, and Syria.) The Islamic State is a quasi-state that claimed a global caliphate and changed its name from the Islamic State of Iraq and the Levant to simply the Islamic State on 29 June 2014.
- The Islamic Wilayat of Somalia (also called the Islamic Republic of Somalia) is an unrecognized emirate under the control and governance of al-Shabaab, which declared its territory as an Islamic emirate in 2008. It aimed at controlling and governing Somalia, although it remains unrecognized. The emirate's de facto capital has been Jilib since 2014.
- The Joseon Cybernation (officially the Joseon Empire), is a self-proclaimed "cyberstate" with limited recognition, claiming to be a legitimate continuation of the Joseon Empire (1392-1897). It has no physical territory, and stylizes itself as a "cloud-based, blockchain-backed kingdom" that exists only in cyberspace. It was recognized by the United Nations member state Antigua and Barbuda in 2023.
- The Sovereign Military Order of Malta (officially the Sovereign Military Hospitaller Order of Saint John of Jerusalem, of Rhodes and of Malta) is a United Nations observer. The order has bi-lateral diplomatic relations with a large number of states, but has no territory other than extraterritorial areas within Rome and Malta. The order's Constitution stated: "The Order is a subject of international law and exercises sovereign functions." Although the order frequently asserts its sovereignty, it does not claim to be a sovereign state, rather it claims to be a sovereign entity. It lacks a defined territory. Since all its members are citizens of other states, almost all of them live in their native countries, and those who reside in the order's extraterritorial properties in Rome do so only in connection with their official duties, the order lacks the characteristic of having a permanent population.
- Western Togoland declared independence from Ghana on 25 September, 2020 and took over police stations, however the insurgents were run out and now live on as a rebellion with no land being maintained by the WTRF.

== See also ==
- List of sovereign states by year
- List of state leaders in the 2020s
