= List of sovereign states in the 1950s =

This is a list of sovereign states in the 1950s, giving an overview of states around the world during the period between 1 January 1950 and 31 December 1959. It contains 108 entries, arranged alphabetically, with information on the status and recognition of their sovereignty. It includes 102 widely recognized sovereign states, 5 entities which were de facto sovereign but which were not widely recognized by other states, and 1 state which was initially unrecognized but then gained full recognition later in the decade.

Map of the World in 1956

== Sovereign states ==
Name and capital city	Information on status and recognition of sovereignty
=== A ===
Afghanistan – Kingdom of Afghanistan; Capital: Kabul	Widely-recognized UN member state.
Albania – People's Republic of Albania; Capital: Tirana	Widely-recognized independent state. UN member state (from 14 December 1955)
→ Andorra – Principality of Andorra; Capital: Andorra la Vella	Widely-recognized independent state. The President of France and Bishop of Urgell were ex officio Co-Princes of Andorra. The defense of Andorra was the responsibility of France and Spain.
Arab Federation – Arab Federation of Iraq and Jordan (from 14 February 1958 to 14 July 1958); Capital: Baghdad	Widely-recognized independent state. The Arab Federation occupied West Bank but these areas were not generally recognized as being part of the Arab Federation.
Argentina – Argentine Republic; Capital: Buenos Aires	Widely-recognized UN member state. Argentina was a federation of 23 provinces and 10 federal territories. It had a claim over Argentine Antarctica. It also claimed the Falkland Islands and South Georgia and the South Sandwich Islands, both of which were British overseas territories.
Australia – Commonwealth of Australia; Capital: Canberra	Widely-recognized UN member state. Commonwealth realm. Australia was a federation of six states and three territories. It had sovereignty over the following external territories: Australian Antarctic Territory; Christmas Island (from 1 October 1958); Cocos (Keeling) Islands (from 23 November 1955); Heard Island and McDonald Islands; Norfolk Island; Australia administered two United Nations Trust Territories: Nauru (with New Zealand and the United Kingdom); Papua and New Guinea
Austria – Republic of Austria; Capital: Vienna	Widely recognized state under Allied occupation. Independent state (from 27 July 1955). Permanent observer at the UN (from 1952 to 14 December 1955). UN member state (from 14 December 1955). Austria was a federation of nine states.
=== B ===
Belgium – Kingdom of Belgium; Capital: Brussels	Widely recognized UN member state. EEC member (from 25 March 1957). Belgium had sovereignty over one colony: Belgian Congo; Belgium administered one United Nations trust territory: Ruanda-Urundi
→ Bhutan – Kingdom of Bhutan; Capital: Punakha (to 1955), Thimphu (from 1955)	Widely recognized independent state. Bhutan was officially guided by India in its foreign affairs.
Bolivia – Republic of Bolivia; Capital: Sucre (official), La Paz (administrative)	Widely recognized UN member state.
Brazil – Republic of the United States of Brazil; Capital: Rio de Janeiro	Widely recognized UN member state. Brazil was a federation of 20 states, five territories, and one federal district. (Note: 20 states: Alagoas, Amazonas, Bahia, Ceará, Espírito Santo, Goiás, Maranhão, Mato Grosso, Minas Gerais, Pará, Paraíba, Paraná, Pernambuco, Piauí, Rio Grande do Norte, Rio Grande do Sul, Rio de Janeiro, Santa Catarina, São Paulo, Sergipe. 5 territories: Acre, Amapá, Fernando de Noronha, Guaporé (renamed Rondônia from 17 February 1956), Rio Branco. 1 federal district: Federal District.)
Bulgaria – People's Republic of Bulgaria; Capital: Sofia	Widely recognized independent state. UN member state (from 14 December 1955).
(Myanmar) Burma – Union of Burma; Capital: Rangoon	Widely recognized UN member state.
=== C ===
Cambodia – Kingdom of Cambodia (from 9 November 1953); Capital: Phnom Penh	Widely recognized independent state. UN member state (from 14 December 1955).
→ Canada – Dominion of Canada; Capital: Ottawa	Widely recognized UN member state; Commonwealth realm. Canada was a federation of ten provinces and two territories.
(Dominion of Ceylon) → Ceylon – Dominion of Ceylon; Capital: Colombo	Widely recognized independent state. UN member state (from 14 December 1955). Commonwealth realm.
Chile – Republic of Chile; Capital: Santiago	Widely recognized UN member state. It had a claim over the Chilean Antarctic Territory.
China, Republic of – Republic of China; Capital: Taipei (seat of government), Nanking (claimed)	Widely recognized UN member state. The Republic of China claimed to be the sole legitimate government of China, but only administered Taiwan, Kinmen, the Matsu Islands, Pratas Island, Itu Aba, and portions of Yunnan Province. The Republic of China had territorial claims over Mongolia; the Tuvan Autonomous Soviet Socialist Republic; the Sixty-Four Villages East of the River (administered by the Soviet Union); The majority of Gorno-Badakhshan (administered by the Soviet Union); The eastern tip of the Wakhan Corridor (administered by Afghanistan); part of the disputed Kashmir region; eastern Bhutan; South Tibet (controlled by India's North-East Frontier Agency); and Kachin State (administered by Burma).
Colombia – Republic of Colombia; Capital: Bogotá	Widely recognized UN member state. Colombia claimed Quita Sueño Bank, Roncador Bank, and Serrana Bank (disputed by the United States); Bajo Nuevo Bank (disputed by Jamaica, Nicaragua and the United States); and Serranilla Bank (disputed by Nicaragua and the United States)
Costa Rica – Republic of Costa Rica; Capital: San José	Widely recognized UN member state.
→ Cuba; Capital: Havana: Cuban First Republic (to 1 January 1959); Cuban Second Republic (from 1 January 1959)	Widely recognized UN member state. The Cuban area of Guantánamo Bay was under the permanent control of the United States.
(Czechoslovak Socialist Republic) Czechoslovakia – Czechoslovak Republic; Capital: Prague	Widely recognized UN member state.
=== D ===
Denmark – Kingdom of Denmark; Capital: Copenhagen	Widely recognized UN member state. The Danish Realm also included one autonomous region: Faroe Islands; Denmark had one colony: Greenland (from 1950 to 5 June 1953)
Dominican Republic – Third Dominican Republic; Capital: Santo Domingo	Widely recognized UN member state.
=== E ===
Ecuador – Republic of Ecuador; Capital: Quito	Widely recognized UN member state.
→ Egypt (to 1 February 1958); Capital: Cairo: Kingdom of Egypt (to 19 June 1953); Republic of Egypt (from 19 June 1953 to 1 February 1958)	Widely recognized UN member state. Egypt occupied Gaza Strip. Egypt administered one condominium: Anglo-Egyptian Sudan (to 31 December 1955, with the United Kingdom)
El Salvador – Republic of El Salvador; Capital: San Salvador	Widely recognized UN member state.
Ethiopia – Ethiopian Empire; Capital: Addis Ababa	Widely recognized UN member state.
=== F ===
Finland – Republic of Finland; Capital: Helsinki	Widely recognized independent state. Permanent observer at the UN (from 1952 to 14 December 1955). UN member state (from 14 December 1955). Finland had a neutral and demilitarised region: → Åland
France; Capital: Paris: Fourth Republic (to 4 October 1958); Fifth Republic (from 4 October 1958)	Widely recognized UN member state. EEC member (from 25 March 1957). France included 21 overseas departments: French Guiana, Guadeloupe, Martinique, Réunion, and multiple departments in French Algeria (three departments to 1955, four departments from 1955 to 1957, fourteen departments from 1957 to 1958, and seventeen departments from 1958 on.) The French Union contained the following autonomous associated states: Cambodia (to 9 November 1953); Laos (to 22 October 1953); (South Vietnam) Vietnam (to 21 July 1954); The French Community consisted of the following autonomous republics: Central African Republic (from 1 December 1958); (France) → Chad (from 28 November 1958); (France) → (Republic of the Congo) Congo (from 28 November 1958); (France) → (Benin) Dahomey (from 4 December 1958); (France) → Gabon (from 28 November 1958); (France) → Ivory Coast (from 4 December 1958); (Madagascar) Malagasy Republic (from 14 October 1958); Mali Federation (from 4 April 1959); (France) → Mauritania (from 28 November 1958); (France) → Niger (from 19 December 1958); Senegal (from 25 November 1958 to 4 April 1959); (French Sudan) Sudanese Republic (from 24 November 1958 to 4 April 1959); (France) Upper Volta (from 11 December 1958); France administered the foreign affairs of the following protectorates: Morocco (to 2 March 1956); Tunisia (to 20 March 1956); Saar (to 1 January 1957); France also had sovereignty over the following overseas territories: Adélie Land (to 6 August 1955); Comoros; French Equatorial Africa, consisting of four territories: Chad (to 28 November 1958); Gabon (to 28 November 1958); Middle Congo (to 28 November 1958); Ubangi-Shari (to 1 December 1958); French India (to 21 July 1954); French Oceania (renamed French Polynesia on 22 July 1957), with one dependency: Clipperton Island; French Somaliland; French Southern and Antarctic Lands (from 6 August 1955); French West Africa, consisting of eight territories: Dahomey (to 4 December 1958); French Guinea (to 1 October 1958); French Sudan (to 24 November 1958); Ivory Coast (to 4 December 1958); Mauritania (to 28 November 1958); Niger (to 19 December 1958); Senegal (to 25 November 1958); Upper Volta (to 11 December 1958); Madagascar (to 14 October 1958), with three dependencies; Crozet Islands (to 6 August 1955); Kerguelen Islands (to 6 August 1955); Saint-Paul and Amsterdam Islands (to 6 August 1955); New Caledonia, with one dependency; Wallis and Futuna; Saint Pierre and Miquelon; It also co-administered one condominium: New Hebrides (with the United Kingdom); France administered two United Nations Trust Territories: French Cameroons (to 31 December 1959); French Togoland (renamed Togo on 22 February 1958); France administered one occupied territory: Fezzan (to 23 December 1951, under UN supervision)
=== G ===
(East Germany) → Germany, East – German Democratic Republic; Capital: East Berlin (disputed)	Widely recognized state under Soviet occupation. Independent state (from 26 March 1954).
Germany, West – Federal Republic of Germany; Capital: Bonn	Widely-recognized state under Allied occupation until 5 May 1955; independent state from 5 May 1955. Permanent observer at the UN (from 1952). EEC member (from 25 March 1957). West Germany was a federation of thirteen states.
Ghana (from 6 March 1957); Capital: Accra	Widely recognized independent state. UN member state (from 8 March 1957). Commonwealth realm.
Greece – Kingdom of Greece; Capital: Athens	Widely recognized UN member state. Greece had sovereignty over Mount Athos, an autonomous monastic state that was jointly governed by the multi-national "Holy Community" on the mountain and the Civil Governor appointed by the Greek Ministry of Foreign Affairs, and spiritually came under the direct jurisdiction of the Ecumenical Patriarchate.
Guatemala – Republic of Guatemala; Capital: Guatemala City	Widely recognized UN member state.
Guinea – Republic of Guinea (from 2 October 1958); Capital: Conakry	Widely recognized independent state. UN member state (from 12 December 1958).
=== H ===
Haiti; Capital: Port-au-Prince: Second Haitian Republic (to 22 October 1957); Duvalier dynasty (from 22 October 1957)	Widely recognized UN member state. Haiti claimed the uninhabited United States possession of Navassa Island.
Holy See → Vatican City
Honduras – Republic of Honduras; Capital: Tegucigalpa	Widely recognized UN member state.
→ → Hungary – People's Republic of Hungary; Capital: Budapest	Widely recognized independent state. UN member state (from 14 December 1955).
=== I ===
Iceland – Republic of Iceland; Capital: Reykjavík	Widely recognized UN member state.
India; Capital: New Delhi: Dominion of India (to 26 January 1950); Republic of India (from 26 January 1950)	Widely recognized UN member state. Commonwealth realm (to 26 January 1950). From 26 January 1950 to 1 November 1956, India was a federation of ten Part A states, eight Part B states, nine Part C states, and four Part D Territories. After 1 November 1956, India was a federation of fourteen states and seven union territories. India had partial sovereignty over one protectorate: Sikkim (from 5 December 1950); Indian sovereignty over South Tibet, administered as part of its North-East Frontier Agency, was disputed by the People's Republic of China. India administered part of the disputed region of Kashmir as the state of Jammu and Kashmir.
Indonesia; Capital: Djakarta: Republic of the United States of Indonesia (to 17 August 1950); Republic of Indonesia (from 17 August 1950)	Widely recognized independent state. UN member state (from 28 September 1950). Until 17 August 1950, Indonesia was a federation of fourteen states. Indonesia had two special provinces: Aceh (from 26 May 1959) and Yogyakarta (from 3 August 1950).
Iran – Imperial State of Iran; Capital: Tehran	Widely recognized UN member state.
→ Iraq; Capital: Baghdad: Kingdom of Iraq (to 14 February 1958); Iraqi Republic (from 14 July 1958)	Widely recognized UN member state.
Ireland; Capital: Dublin	Widely recognized independent state. UN member state (from 14 December 1955).
Israel – State of Israel; Capital: Jerusalem	Widely recognized UN member state.
Italy – Italian Republic; Capital: Rome	Widely recognized independent state. UN member state (from 14 December 1955). Italy had 5 autonomous regions: Aosta Valley, Friuli-Venezia Giulia, Sardinia, Sicily, and Trentino-Alto Adige/Südtirol. EEC member (from 25 March 1957). Italy administered one United Nations Trust Territory: Somalia (from 1 April 1950)
=== J ===
→ Japan; Capital: Tokyo	Widely recognized state under United States occupation until 28 April 1952. Full sovereignty restored on 28 April 1952. Permanent observer at the UN (from 1952 to 18 December 1956). UN member state (from 18 December 1956). Japan had residual sovereignty over the Ryukyu Islands and the Bonin-Volcano Islands, which were occupied and administered by the United States.
Jordan – Hashemite Kingdom of Jordan (to 14 February 1958, from 14 July 1958); Capital: Amman	Widely recognized independent state. UN member state (from 14 December 1955). Jordan occupied West Bank but these areas were not generally recognized as being part of Jordan.
=== K ===
Korea, North – Democratic People's Republic of Korea; Capital: Seoul (de jure, claimed), Pyongyang (de facto)	Widely recognized independent state. (Note: North Korea was not recognized by Estonia, France, Japan, or South Korea. Was claimed by Japan until 28 April 1952 and by South Korea.) Claimed to be the sole legitimate government of Korea.
Korea, South – Republic of Korea; Capital: Seoul	Widely recognized independent state. (Note: South Korea was not recognized by the Soviet Union, the People's Republic of China, Romania or North Korea. Was claimed by Japan until 28 April 1952 and by North Korea.) Permanent observer at the UN. Claimed to be the sole legitimate government of Korea.
=== L ===
Laos – Kingdom of Laos (from 22 October 1953); Capital: Vientiane	Widely recognized independent state. UN member state (from 14 December 1955).
Lebanon – Lebanese Republic; Capital: Beirut	Widely recognized UN member state.
Liberia – Republic of Liberia; Capital: Monrovia	Widely recognized UN member state.
Libya – United Kingdom of Libya (from 24 December 1951); Capital: Tripoli	Widely recognized independent state. UN member state (from 14 December 1955). Libya was a federation of three provinces.
Liechtenstein; Capital: Vaduz	Widely recognized independent state. The defense of Liechtenstein was the responsibility of Switzerland.
Luxembourg – Grand Duchy of Luxembourg; Capital: Luxembourg	Widely recognized UN member state. EEC member (from 25 March 1957).
=== M ===
Malaya – Federation of Malaya (from 31 August 1957); Capital: Kuala Lumpur	Widely recognized independent state. UN member state (from 17 September 1957). Malaya was a federation of eleven states.
Mexico – United Mexican States; Capital: Mexico City	Widely recognized UN member state. Mexico was a federation of 29 states, three territories, and one federal district.
Monaco – Principality of Monaco; Capital: Monaco	Widely recognized independent state. Permanent observer at the UN (from 1956). The defense of Monaco was the responsibility of France.
Mongolia – Mongolian People's Republic; Capital: Ulaanbaatar	Widely recognized independent state.
Morocco (from 2 March 1956); Capital: Rabat: Sultanate of Morocco (from 7 April 1956 to 14 August 1957); Kingdom of Morocco (from 14 August 1957)	Widely recognized independent state. UN member state (from 12 November 1956). Morocco disputed the Spanish sovereignty over Ceuta, Isla de Alborán, Isla Perejil, Islas Chafarinas, Melilla and Peñón de Alhucemas. To 1 March 1956, de jure sovereign state under French protectorate Moroccan rule restored over the Spanish zone of Northern Morocco on 7 April 1956. Moroccan rule restored over the Tangier International Zone on 29 October 1956. Moroccan rule restored over Cape Juby on 2 April 1958.
=== N ===
Nepal – Kingdom of Nepal; Capital: Kathmandu	Widely recognized independent state. UN member state (from 14 December 1955).
Netherlands – Kingdom of the Netherlands; Capital: Amsterdam (official), The Hague (seat of government)	Widely recognized UN member state. The Kingdom of the Netherlands consisted of three autonomous countries: Netherlands (from 15 December 1954); Netherlands Antilles (from 15 December 1954); Suriname (from 15 December 1954); The Kingdom of the Netherlands as a whole was a member of the EEC (from 25 March 1957), but Suriname and the Netherlands Antilles were not. The Kingdom of the Netherlands had sovereignty over the following colonies: Netherlands Antilles (to 15 December 1954); Netherlands New Guinea; Suriname (to 15 December 1954)
New Zealand – Dominion of New Zealand; Capital: Wellington	Widely recognized UN member state. Commonwealth realm. New Zealand had sovereignty over four dependent territories: Cook Islands; Niue; Ross Dependency; Tokelau Islands; The government of Tokelau Islands claimed Swains Island, part of American Samoa (a U.S. dependence). New Zealand administered two United Nations Trust Territories: Nauru (with Australia and the United Kingdom); Western Samoa Trust Territory
Nicaragua – Republic of Nicaragua; Capital: Managua	Widely recognized UN member state.
Norway – Kingdom of Norway; Capital: Oslo	Widely recognized UN member state. Norway had two integral overseas areas: Jan Mayen and Svalbard. The latter area had a special status due to the Spitsbergen Treaty. Norway had sovereignty over the following dependencies: Bouvet Island; Peter I Island; Queen Maud Land
=== P ===
Pakistan; Capital: Karachi: Dominion of Pakistan (to 23 March 1956); Islamic Republic of Pakistan (from 23 March 1956)	Widely recognized UN member state. Commonwealth realm (to 23 March 1956). Pakistan was a federation of eight provinces, thirteen princely states, and one territory. It administered part of the disputed region of Kashmir.
Palestine – All-Palestine Protectorate (until 1959); Capital: Jerusalem (claimed), Cairo (provisional)	Partially recognized de facto independent state; recognized by six Arab League states.
Panama – Republic of Panama; Capital: Panama City	Widely recognized UN member state.
→ Paraguay – Republic of Paraguay; Capital: Asunción	Widely recognized UN member state.
→ Peru – Peruvian Republic; Capital: Lima	Widely recognized UN member state.
Philippines – Republic of the Philippines; Capital: Quezon City (official), Baguio (summer)	Widely recognized UN member state.
Poland; Capital: Warsaw: Republic of Poland (to 22 July 1952); Polish People's Republic (from 22 July 1952)	Widely recognized UN member state. Poland's government was still in exile.
Portugal – Portuguese Republic; Capital: Lisbon	Widely recognized independent state. UN member state (from 14 December 1955). Portugal had sovereignty over the following colonies (overseas province from 11 June 1951): Cape Verde Islands; Macau; Portuguese East Africa (renamed Mozambique on 11 June 1951); Portuguese Guinea; Portuguese India; Portuguese Timor; Portuguese West Africa (renamed Angola on 11 June 1951); São Tomé and Príncipe; It also had sovereignty over one possession: São João Baptista de Ajudá; Portugal claimed the Spanish municipalities of Olivenza and Táliga.
=== R ===
→ Romania – Romanian People's Republic; Capital: Bucharest	Widely recognized independent state. UN member state (from 14 December 1955).
=== S ===
San Marino – Republic of San Marino; Capital: San Marino	Widely recognized independent state.
Saudi Arabia – Kingdom of Saudi Arabia; Capital: Riyadh	Widely recognized UN member state.
Sikkim – Kingdom of Sikkim (to 5 December 1950); Capital: Gangtok	Widely-recognized independent state until December 5, 1950. Indian protectorate thereafter.
South Africa – Union of South Africa; Capital: Pretoria (administrative), Cape Town (legislative), Bloemfontein (judicial)	Widely recognized UN member state. Commonwealth realm. South Africa administered one League of Nations mandate: South-West Africa
→ Soviet Union – Union of Soviet Socialist Republics; Capital: Moscow	Widely recognized UN member state. The Soviet Union was a federation of 16 (later 15) republics, two of which (Byelorussia and Ukraine) were UN members in their own right.
(Francoist Spain) Spain – Spanish State; Capital: Madrid	Widely recognized independent state. Permanent observer at the UN (from 1955 to 14 December 1955). UN member state (from 14 December 1955). Spain had sovereignty over the following overseas provinces: Fernando Pó (from 30 June 1959); Ifni (from 10 April 1958); Río Muni (from 30 June 1959); Spanish Sahara (from 10 April 1958); Spanish Guinea (to 30 June 1959); Spanish West Africa (to 10 April 1958); Spain administered the foreign affairs of one protectorate: Spanish Morocco, de jure the Spanish sphere of influence in Morocco (to 7 April 1956); Its sovereignty over Ceuta, Isla de Alborán, Isla Perejil, Islas Chafarinas, Melilla and Peñón de Alhucemas was disputed by Morocco. Its sovereignty over Olivenza and Táliga was disputed by Portugal. It claimed the British overseas territory of Gibraltar.
Sudan – Republic of the Sudan (from 1 January 1956); Capital: Khartoum	Widely recognized independent state. UN member state (from 12 November 1956).
Sweden – Kingdom of Sweden; Capital: Stockholm	Widely recognized UN member state.
Switzerland – Swiss Confederation; Capital: Bern	Widely recognized independent state. Permanent observer at the UN. Switzerland was a federation of 25 cantons.
Syria (to 1 February 1958); Capital: Damascus: First Syrian Republic (to 5 September 1950); Second Syrian Republic (from 5 September 1950 to 1 February 1958)	Widely recognized UN member state.
=== T ===
Thailand – Kingdom of Thailand; Capital: Bangkok	Widely-recognized UN member state.
Tunisia (from 20 March 1956); Capital: Tunis: Kingdom of Tunisia (from 20 March 1956 to 25 July 1957); Tunisian Republic (from 25 July 1957)	Widely-recognized independent state. UN member state from 12 November 1956.
Turkey – Republic of Turkey; Capital: Ankara	Widely recognized UN member state.
=== U ===
United Arab Republic (from 1 February 1958); Capital: Cairo	Widely-recognized UN member state. United Arab States member (from 1958). The United Arab Republic consisted of two states: Syria and Egypt. The United Arab Republic occupied the Gaza Strip, but this area was not generally recognized as being part of the UAR.
United Arab States (from 8 March 1958)	Widely-recognized UN member state. The United Arab States consisted of two states (later three): The United Arab Republic (Egypt and Syria, later, just Egypt), North Yemen, and later Syria.
United Kingdom – United Kingdom of Great Britain and Northern Ireland; Capital: London	Widely-recognized UN member state. Commonwealth realm. The United Kingdom was composed of four countries: England, Northern Ireland, Scotland, and Wales. The United Kingdom administered the foreign affairs of the following protected states: Bahrain; → Brunei; Kuwait; → Malaya (to 30 August 1957); → Maldives Islands; Qatar; Tonga (from 3 July 1952); Trucial States, consisting of eight protected states: → Abu Dhabi; Ajman; Dubai; Fujairah; (Emirate of Sharjah) Kalba (to 30 July 1952); Ras al-Khaimah; Sharjah; Umm al-Quwain; The United Kingdom co-administered the following condominiums: Anglo-Egyptian Sudan (to 31 December 1955, with Egypt); Canton and Enderbury Islands (with the United States); → → New Hebrides (with France); It also had sovereignty over the following crown colonies and protectorates: (Aden Colony) Aden, with one dependency: Kamaran; Ashanti (to 1956); (The Bahamas) → Bahama Islands; Barbados (to 3 January 1958); Basutoland; Bechuanaland; Bermuda; → British Guiana; British Honduras; → British Leeward Islands (to 3 January 1958); → British Solomon Islands; → → British Somaliland; → British Windward Islands (to 3 January 1958); Christmas Island (from 1 January 1958 to 1 October 1958); Cyprus; Falkland Islands (disputed by Argentina), with one dependency; Falkland Islands Dependencies; Fiji, with two dependencies; Pitcairn Islands; Rotuma; Gambia; Gibraltar; Gilbert and Ellice Islands; Gold Coast (to 5 March 1957); → → Hong Kong; → Jamaica (to 3 January 1958); Kenya; Malta; Mauritius; → Nigeria (also a federation from 1 October 1954); North Borneo; Northern Rhodesia (to 1 August 1953); Northern Territories of the Gold Coast (to 1956); Nyasaland (to 1 August 1953); Pitcairn Islands (from 3 July 1952); Rhodesia and Nyasaland (from 1 August 1953); Saint Helena, with two dependencies; Ascension Island; Tristan da Cunha; Sarawak; Seychelles; Sierra Leone; → → Singapore, with two dependencies; Christmas Island (to 1 January 1958); Cocos (Keeling) Islands (to 23 November 1955); (United Kingdom) South Orkney Islands; Southern Rhodesia (to 1 August 1953); (United Kingdom) South Shetland Islands; (United Kingdom) Suez Canal Zone (until 1956); Swaziland; Tonga; Trinidad and Tobago (to 3 January 1958); Uganda; West Indies Federation (from 3 January 1958); Zanzibar; In addition, the British Monarch had direct sovereignty over three self-governing Crown dependencies: Guernsey, with two dependencies: Alderney; Sark; Isle of Man; Jersey; The United Kingdom administered four United Nations Trust Territories: British Togoland (to 13 December 1956); British Cameroons; Nauru (with Australia and New Zealand); Tanganyika; The United Kingdom administered four occupied territories: Cyrenaica (to 23 December 1951, under UN supervision); Eritrea (to 15 September 1952, under UN supervision from 19 February 1951); Italian Somaliland (to 1 April 1950); Tripolitania (to 23 December 1951, under UN supervision)
→ United States – United States of America; Capital: Washington, D.C.	Widely recognized UN member state. The United States was a federation of 48 (later 50) states, one federal district, and two (later one) incorporated territories. It asserted sovereignty over the following inhabited unincorporated territories: (United States) → (United States) American Samoa (including Swains Island, disputed by Tokelau); Guam; Panama Canal Zone; (United States) → Puerto Rico; United States Virgin Islands; It also asserted sovereignty over fifteen uninhabited unincorporated territories: Bajo Nuevo Bank (claimed by Colombia and Nicaragua); Baker Island; Birnie Island (claimed by United Kingdom); Caroline Island (claimed by United Kingdom); Christmas Island (claimed by United Kingdom); Corn Islands; Howland Island; Jarvis Island; Johnston Atoll; Kingman Reef; Midway Atoll; Navassa Island (claimed by Haiti); Quita Sueño Bank (claimed by Colombia); Roncador Bank (claimed by Colombia); Serrana Bank (claimed by Colombia); Serranilla Bank (claimed by Colombia, Jamaica, and Nicaragua); Swan Islands; Wake Island; The United States co-administered the following condominium: Canton and Enderbury Islands (with the United Kingdom); After 28 April 1952, the United States administered two territories under the residual sovereignty of Japan: Bonin-Volcano Islands; Ryukyu Islands; In addition, the United States administered one United Nations Trust Territory: Trust Territory of the Pacific Islands
Uruguay – Eastern Republic of Uruguay; Capital: Montevideo	Widely recognized UN member state.
=== V ===
Vatican City – Vatican City State; Capital: Vatican City	Widely recognized independent state. Vatican City was administered by the Holy See, a sovereign entity recognized by a large number of countries. The Holy See also administered a number of extraterritorial properties in Italy. The Pope was the ex officio head of state of Vatican City.
→ Venezuela; Capital: Caracas: United States of Venezuela (to 15 April 1953); Republic of Venezuela (from 15 April 1953)	Widely recognized UN member state. Venezuela was a federation of 20 states, two territories, one federal dependency, and one federal district.
(North Vietnam) → Vietnam, North – Democratic Republic of Vietnam; Capital: Hanoi	De facto independent state. Claimed by France (to 21 July 1954). Widely recognized (from 21 July 1954).
Vietnam, South (from 21 July 1954); Capital: Saigon: State of Vietnam (from 21 July 1954 to 26 October 1955); Republic of Vietnam (from 26 October 1955)	Widely recognized independent state. Permanent observer at the UN (from 1952). South Vietnam claimed sovereignty over the Paracel Islands (disputed by the People's Republic of China and the Republic of China) and Spratly Islands (disputed by the People's Republic of China, the Republic of China, and the Philippines).
=== Y ===
Yemen – Mutawakkilite Kingdom of Yemen (to 8 March 1958); Capital: Ta'izz	Widely recognized UN member state. United Arab States member (from 1958).
Yugoslavia – Federal People's Republic of Yugoslavia; Capital: Belgrade	Widely recognized UN member state. Yugoslavia was a federation of six republics.
=== States with limited recognition, independence of sovereignty ===
China, People's Republic of – People's Republic of China; Capital: Beijing	Partially recognized de facto independent state. The People's Republic of China had four autonomous regions: Guangxi (from 5 March 1958), Inner Mongolia, Ningxia (from 25 October 1958), Xinjiang (from 1 October 1955). The People's Republic of China claimed Taiwan, Kinmen, the Matsu Islands, Pratas Island and the Vereker Banks, and Itu Aba, all of which were governed by the Republic of China. It also claimed the Paracel Islands (disputed by the Republic of China and South Vietnam), the Spratly Islands (disputed by the Republic of China, South Vietnam, and the Philippines), and South Tibet (controlled by India's North-East Frontier Agency).	(India) Dadra / Dadra and Nagar Haveli (from 22 July 1954); Capital: Dadra (to 2 August 1954), Silvassa (from 2 August 1954): Free Dadra (from 22 July 1954 to 15 August 1954); Free Dadra and Nagar Haveli (from 15 August 1954)	De facto independent state. Claimed by Portugal.
Muscat and Oman – Sultanate of Muscat and Oman; Capital: Muscat, Oman	Protectorate of the of the United Kingdom. Muscat and Oman contained one self-governing territory, The Imamate of Oman (to 11 August 1957).
(Republic of South Maluku) South Maluku – Republic of South Maluku (from 25 April 1950 to 17 October 1952); Capital: Ambon	De facto independent state. Not recognized by any other state. Claimed by Indonesia.
Suvadive Islands – United Suvadive Republic (from 3 January 1959); Capital: Hithadhoo	De facto independent state. Not recognized by any other state. Claimed by the United Kingdom.
Tibet (to 23 May 1951); Capital: Lhasa	De facto independent state. Recognized by no other sovereign state. Claimed by the Republic of China and by the People's Republic of China.

== Other entities ==
Excluded from the list above are the following noteworthy entities which either were not fully sovereign or did not claim to be independent:

- Estonia was incorporated into the Soviet Union in 1940, but the legality of the annexation was not widely recognized. The Baltic diplomatic services in the West continued to be recognised as representing the de jure state.
- Latvia was incorporated into the Soviet Union in 1940, but the legality of the annexation was not widely recognized. The Baltic diplomatic services in the West continued to be recognised as representing the de jure state.
- Lithuania was incorporated into the Soviet Union in 1940, but the legality of the annexation was not widely recognized. The Baltic diplomatic services in the West continued to be recognised as representing the de jure state.
- Provisional Government of the Algerian Republic was the government-in-exile of the Algerian National Liberation Front (FLN) during the latter part of the Algerian War of Independence (1954–1962) beginning in 1958.
- The Saudi–Iraqi neutral zone was a strip of neutral territory between Iraq and Saudi Arabia.
- The Saudi–Kuwaiti neutral zone was a strip of neutral territory between Kuwait and Saudi Arabia.
- The Sovereign Military Order of Malta was an entity claiming sovereignty. The order had bi-lateral diplomatic relations with a large number of states, but had no territory other than extraterritorial areas within Rome. Although the order frequently asserted its sovereignty, it did not claim to be a sovereign state. It lacked a defined territory. Since all its members were citizens of other states, almost all of them lived in their native countries, and those who resided in the order's extraterritorial properties in Rome did so only in connection with their official duties, the order lacked the characteristic of having a permanent population.
- Tangier was an international zone under the joint administration of France, Spain, the United Kingdom, Italy, Portugal and Belgium. It was reintegrated into Morocco on 29 October 1956.
- Free Territory of Trieste was a state under the occupation of the United Kingdom, United States, and Yugoslavia. No governor was appointed to the Free Territory of Trieste and it never functioned as a real independent state. Trieste was dissolved on 26 October, 1954 becoming part of Yugoslavia.
- → West Berlin was a political enclave that was closely aligned with – but not actually a part of – West Germany. It consisted of three occupied sectors administered by the United States, the United Kingdom, and France.

== See also ==
- List of sovereign states by year
- List of state leaders in 1950
- List of state leaders in 1951
- List of state leaders in 1952
- List of state leaders in 1953
- List of state leaders in 1954
- List of state leaders in 1955
- List of state leaders in 1956
- List of state leaders in 1957
- List of state leaders in 1958
- List of state leaders in 1959
