= List of sovereign states in 1496 =

The notion of a sovereign state arises in the 16th century with the development of modern diplomacy. For earlier times, the term "sovereign state" is an anachronism. What corresponded to sovereign states in the medieval and ancient period were monarchs ruling By the Grace of God, de facto feudal or imperial autocrats, or de facto independent nations or tribal confederations.

== Sovereign states ==
=== A ===
- Aach - Lordship of Aach
- Aachen - Free Imperial City of Aachen
- Aalen - Free Imperial City of Aalen
- Aceh - Sultanate of Aceh (from 1496)
- Adal - Adal Sultanate
- Alodia - Kingdom of Alodia
- Alsace - Duchy of Alsace
- Andorra - Principality of Andorra
- Anhalt - Principality of Anhalt
- Annam - Kingdom of Annam
- Ansbach - Margraviate of Ansbach
- Aq Koyunlu Aq Qoyunlu (White Sheep Turkomans)
- Aragon - Kingdom of Aragon
- Arakan - Kingdom of Arakan
- Armagnac - County of Armagnac
- Ashanti - Kingdom of Ashanti
- Assam - Kingdom of Assam
- Astrakhan - Khanate of Astrakhan
- Austria - Archduchy of Austria
- Auvergne - County of Auvergne
- Ayutthaya - Ayutthaya Kingdom
- Aztecs - Aztec Empire

=== B ===
- Baden - Margraviate of Baden
- Bali - Kingdom of Bali
- Bavaria - Duchy of Bavaria
- Bengal - Sultanate of Bengal
- Benin - Benin Empire
- Bohemia - Kingdom of Bohemia
- Bourbonnais - Duchy of Bourbonnais
- Brandenburg - March/Margraviate of Brandenburg
- Bremen - Prince-Archbishopric of Bremen
- Brittany - Duchy of Brittany
- Brunei - Sultanate of Brunei
- Brunswick-Lüneburg - Duchy of Brunswick-Lüneburg

=== C ===
- Castille - Crown of Castille
- Catalonia - Principality of Catalonia
- Ceylon - Kotte Kingdom
- Chagatai Khanate - Chagatai Khanate
- Champa - Kingdom of Champa
- Cherokee - Cherokee Tribe
- China - Empire of the Great Ming
- Cleves - Duchy of Cleves
- Cologne - Electorate of Cologne
- Connacht - Kingdom of Connacht
- Cospaia - Republic of Cospaia
- Creek - Creek Tribe
- Crimea - Crimean Khanate

=== D ===
- Đại Việt - Kingdom of Đại Việt
- Deccan - Kingdom of Deccan
- Delhi - Sultanate of Delhi
- Denmark - Kingdom of Denmark

=== E ===
- England - Kingdom of England
- Ethiopia - Ethiopian Empire

=== F ===
- France - Kingdom of France
- Friesland - Lordship of Friesland
- Funj - Funj Tribe

=== G ===
- Gelre - Duchy of Gelre
- Georgia - Kingdom of Georgia
- Republic of Genoa - The Most Serene Republic of Genoa
- Golden Horde - Golden Horde Khanate
- Gondwana - Kingdom of Gondwana
- Gujarat - Sultanate of Gujarat

=== H ===
- Haasa - The Sheikdom of al-Haasa
- Hamburg - Free and Hanseatic City of Hamburg
- Hausa - Hausa Kingdoms
- Hejaz - Sultanate of Hejaz
- Hesse - Landgraviate of Hesse
- Hungary - Kingdom of Hungary
- Huron - Huron Tribe

=== I ===
- Inca - Inca Empire
- Iroquois - Iroquois Tribe

=== J ===
- Japan - Sengoku period of Japan

=== K ===
- Kanem Bornu - Bornu Empire
- Kartli - Kingdom of Kartli
- Kashmir - Sultanate of Kashmir
- Kazakh Khanate - Kazakh Khanate
- Kazan - Kazan Khanate
- Khandesh - Kingdom of Khandesh
- Khmer - Khmer Empire
- Knights Hospitaller - Sovereign Order of Saint John of Jerusalem of Rhodes and of Malta, Knights of Malta, Knights of Rhodes, and Chevaliers of Malta
- Kongo - Kingdom of Kongo
- Korea - Kingdom of Joseon

=== L ===
- Lan Na - Kingdom of Lan Na
- Lan Xang - Kingdom of Lan Xang
- Leinster - Kingdom of Leinster
- Liège - Prince-Bishopric of Liège
- Lithuania - Grand Duchy of Lithuania
- Lorraine - Duchy of Lorraine

=== M ===
- Mainz - Archbishopric of Mainz
- Makassar - Sultanate of Makassar
- Malacca - Sultanate of Malacca
- Maldives - Sultanate of Maldives
- Mali - Mali Empire
- Malwa - Malwa Sultanate
- Mamluk - Mamluk Sultanate
- Manchu - Manchu People
- Manipur - Kingdom of Manipur
- Mantua - Duchy of Mantua
- Maya - Maya Empire
- Mazovia - Duchy of Mazovia
- Mecklenburg - Duchy of Mecklenburg
- Milan - Duchy of Milan
- Modena - Duchy of Modena and Reggio
- Moldavia - Principality of Moldavia
- Monaco - Principality of Monaco
- Mongol Khanate - Khanate of Mongol
- Morocco - Sultanate of Morocco
- Moscow - Grand Duchy of Moscow
- Mrauk U - Kingdom of Mrauk U
- Munster - Kingdom of Munster
- Münster - Prince-Bishopric of Münster
- Mutapa - Kingdom of Mutapa
- Mysore - Kingdom of Mysore

=== N ===
- Najd - Sultanate of Najd
- Naples - Kingdom of Naples
- Navarra - Kingdom of Navarra
- Naxos - Duchy of the Naxos
- Nepal - Kingdom of Nepal
- Nogai - Nogai Horde
- Norway - Kingdom of Norway

=== O ===
- Oirats - Oirat Horde
- Oldenburg - County of Oldenburg
- Oman - Sultanate of Oman
- Orissa - Kingdom of Orissa
- Orléans - Duchy of Orléans
- Ottoman Empire - Sublime Ottoman State
- Oyo - Oyo Empire

=== P ===
- Electorate of the Palatinate - Palatinate of the Rhine
- Papal States - States of the Church
- Pegu - Kingdom of Pegu
- Pisa - Republic of Pisa
- Poland - Kingdom of Poland
- Pomerania - Duchy of Pomerania
- Portugal - Kingdom of Portugal
- Pskov - Pskov Republic

=== Q ===
- Qasim - Qasim Khanate

=== R ===
- Ragusa - Republic of Ragusa
- Rājputāna - Kingdom of Rājputāna
- Riga - Archbishopric of Riga
- (Ryukyu Kingdom) Ryukyu - Kingdom of Ryukyu

=== S ===
- Saaremaa - Bishopric of Saaremaa-Wiek
- Salzburg - Archbishopric of Salzburg
- San Marino - Most Serene Republic of San Marino
- County of Santa Fiora
- Savoy - Duchy of Savoy
- Scotland - Kingdom of Scotland
- Shawnee - Shawnee Tribe
- Sibir - Khanate of Sibir
- Sicily - Kingdom of Sicily
- Siena - Republic of Siena
- Silesia - Duchy of Silesia
- Sindh - Kingdom of Sindh
- Songhai - Songhai Empire
- Sukhothai - Kingdom of Sukhothai
- Sulu - Sultanate of Sulu
- Swahili - Swahili Tribe
- Sweden - Kingdom of Sweden
- Switzerland - Swiss Confederacy

=== T ===
- Tartu - Bishopric of Tartu
- Taungu - Kingdom of Taungu
- Teutonic Knights - Teutonic Order
- Thuringia - Duchy of Thuringia
- Tibet - Tibetan Empire
- Timurid - Timurid Empire
- Transylvania - Principality of Transylvania
- Travancore - Kingdom of Travancore
- Trier - Archbishopric of Trier
- Tripoli - Sultanate of Tripoli
- Tunisia - Kingdom of Tunisia
- Tuscany - Republic of Tuscany
- Tír Eoghain - Kingdom of Tyrone

=== U ===
- Urbino - Archdiocese of Urbino
- Utrecht - Bishopric of Utrecht

=== V ===
- Venice - Most Serene Republic of Venice
- Vijayanagara - Vijayanagara Empire

=== W ===
- Wallachia - Principality of Wallachia
- (Kingdom of Württemberg) Württemberg - Duchy of Württemberg
- Würzburg - Bishopric of Würzburg

=== Y ===
- Yemen - Kingdom of Yemen

=== Z ===
- Zapotec - Zapotec Empire
- Zeta - Principality of Zeta
