= List of sovereign states in 1528 =

== Sovereign states ==
=== A ===
- Aceh - Sultanate of Aceh
  Capital: Kutaraja
- Adal - Adal Sultanate
  Capital: Harar
- Airgíalla - Kingdom of Airgíalla
  Capital: Not specified
- Alsace - Duchy of Alsace
- Anhalt - Principality of Anhalt
- Annam
- Ansbach - Principality of Ansbach
- Aragon - Kingdom of Aragon
- Arakan - Kingdom of Arakan
- Armagnac - County of Armagnac
- Armorica - Kingdom (Dukedom) of Armorica
- (Ashanti Empire) Ashanti - Kingdom of Ashanti
- Assam - Kingdom of Assam
- Astrakhan - Astrakhan Khanate
- Austria - Archduchy of Austria
- Auvergne - County of Auvergne
- Ayutthaya - Ayutthaya Kingdom
- Aztec - Aztec Empire

=== B ===
- Margraviate of Baden
- Kingdom of Bali
- Duchy of Bavaria
- Béarn - Viscounty of Béarn
- Kingdom of Bengal
- (Benin Empire) Empire of Benin
- Berar Sultanate
- Kingdom of Bhadgaon
- Sultanate of Bijapur
- Duchy of Bourbonnais
- Margraviate of Brandenburg
- Archbishopric of Bremen
- Duchy of Brittany
- Brunei - Sultanate of Brunei
- Duchy of Brunswick-Lüneburg
- Khanate of Bukhara

=== C ===
- Catalonia - Principality of Catalonia
- Ceylon - Kotte Kingdom
- Kingdom of Chabor (Chaibor, Kheibar)
- Chagatai Khanate
- Kingdom of Champa
- Cherokee Tribe
- China - Empire of the Great Ming
- Duchy of Cleves
- Electorate of Cologne
- Kingdom of Connacht
- Cospaia - Republic of Cospaia
- Creek Tribe
- Crimea - Crimean Khanate

=== D ===
- Kingdom of Đại Việt
- Sultanate of Delhi
- Kingdom of Denmark
- Sultanate of Dulkadir

=== E ===
- Kingdom of England
- Ethiopian Empire

=== F ===
- Kingdom of France
- Kingdom of Funj

=== G ===
- Duchy of Gelre
- Most Serene Republic of Genoa
- Kingdom of Georgia
- Kingdom of Golconda (Qutb Shahi dynasty)
- Kingdom of Gondwana
- Sultanate of Gujarat

=== H ===
- Sheikdom of al-Haasa
- Free and Hanseatic City of Hamburg
- Hausa Kingdoms
- Landgraviate of Hesse
- Huron Tribe

=== I ===
- Inca Empire
- Iroquois Tribe

=== J ===
- Japan - Sengoku period

=== K ===
- Bornu Empire
- Kartli - Kingdom of Kartli
- Sultanate of Kashmir
- Kazakh Khanate
- Khanate of Kazan
- Kingdom of Khandesh
- Khanate of Khiva
- Khmer Empire
- (Sovereign Military Order of Malta) Knights Hospitaller - Sovereign Order of Saint John of Jerusalem of Rhodes and of Malta, Knights of Malta, Knights of Rhodes, and Chevaliers of Malta
- Kingdom of Kongo
- Korea - Kingdom of Joseon

=== L ===
- Kingdom of Lan Na
- Kingdom of Lan Xang
- Kingdom of Leinster
- Prince-Bishopric of Liège
- Grand Duchy of Lithuania
- Duchy of Lorraine

=== M ===
- Archbishopric of Mainz
- Sultanate of Makassar
- Malacca Sultanate
- Sultanate of Maldives
- Mali Empire
- Malwa Sultanate
- Mamluk Sultanate
- Manchu - Manchu People
- Kingdom of Manipur
- Duchy of Mantua
- Maya Empire
- Duchy of Mecklenburg
- Duchy of Milan
- Duchy of Modena and Reggio
- Principality of Moldavia
- Principality of Monaco
- Mongol Khanate
- Montenegro
- Morocco
- Kingdom of Mrauk U
- Mughal Empire
- Kingdom of Munster
- Prince-Bishopric of Münster
- Muscovy - Grand Duchy of Moscow
- Kingdom of Mutapa
- Mysore - Kingdom of Mysore

=== N ===
- Nejd - Sultanate of Najd
- Namayan
- Kingdom of Navarre
- Naxos - Duchy of the Archipelago
- Kingdom of Nepal
- Nogai Horde
- Kingdom of Norway

=== O ===
- Oirat Horde
- County of Oldenburg
- Kingdom of Odisha
- Duchy of Orléans
- (Ottoman Empire) Sublime Ottoman State
- Oyo Empire

=== P ===
- Electorate of the Palatinate
- Papal States
- Pattani Kingdom
- Kingdom of Pegu
- Persian Empire
- Kingdom of Poland
- House of Pomerania
- Kingdom of Portugal
- Duchy of Prussia

=== Q ===
- Qasim Khanate

=== R ===
- Republic of Ragusa
- Archbishopric of Riga
- Ryukyu Kingdom

=== S ===
- Archbishopric of Salzburg
- Most Serene Republic of San Marino
- County of Santa Fiora
- Duchy of Savoy
- Electorate of Saxony
- Kingdom of Scotland
- Kingdom of Shan
- Shawnee Tribe
- Khanate of Sibir
- Republic of Siena
- Duchy of Silesia
- Songhai Empire
- - Habsburg Kingdom of Spain
- Kingdom of Sukhothai
- Sultanate of Sulu
- Swahili Tribe
- Kingdom of Sweden
- (Switzerland) Old Swiss Confederacy

=== T ===
- Terra Mariana (Livonian Confederation)

=== U ===
- Uí Failghe - Kingdom of Uí Failghe

=== W ===
- Principality of Wallachia

== States claiming sovereignty ==
- Republic of Goust
