= List of sovereign states in 1750 =

== Sovereign states ==
=== A ===
- Aboh – Aboh Kingdom
- Abkhazia – Principality of Abkhazia
- Abu 'Arish – Principality of Abu 'Arish
- Aceh – Aceh Sultanate
- Adrar – Emirate of Adrar
- Afghanistan – Durrani Empire
- Ahom – Ahom Kingdom
- Aïr – Terene Sultanate of Aïr
- Ajman – Emirate of Ajman
- Akure – Akure Kingdom
- Akyem – Akyem Confederacy
- Amarro – Amarro Kingdom
- Ambohidratrimo – Ambohidratrimo Kingdom
- Andorra – Principality of Andorra
- Anrindrano – Anrindrano Kingdom
- Angoche – Angoche Sultanate
- Antankarana – Antankarana Kingdom
- Anziku – Anziku Kingdom
- Arakkal – Arakkal Kingdom
- Arcot – Nawabs of the Carnatic
- Ardabil – Ardabil Khanate
- Aro – Aro Confederacy
- Asahan – Sultanate of Asahan
- Ashanti – Kingdom of Ashanti
- Aulaqi – Aulaqi Sultanate
- Aussa – Sultanate of Aussa
- Avar – Avar Khanate
- Ayutthaya – Kingdom of Ayutthaya
- Ayayna – Ayayna Sheikhdom

=== B ===
- Badakhshan – Badakhshan Khanate
- Bagirmi – Sultanate of Bagirmi
- Baku – Baku Khanate
- Bali – Kingdom of Bali
- Baltistan
- Bamana – Bamana Empire
- Bambao – Sultanate of Bambao
- Bamum – Kingdom of Bamum
- Bani Khalid
- Banjar – Sultanate of Banjar
- Baol – Kingdom of Baol
- Bara – Bara Kingdom
- Barotseland – Kingdom of Barotseland
- Barwani – Barwani State
- Beihan – Emirate of Beihan
- Bengal – Principality of Bengal
- Benin – Kingdom of Benin
- Bhaktapur – Kingdom of Bhaktapur
- Bhutan – Kingdom of Bhutan
- Bida – Bida Emirate
- Bidache – Principality of Bidache
- Bikaner – Bikaner State
- Bima – Sultanate of Bima
- Biu – Biu Kingdom
- Boina – Boina Kingdom
- Bonny – Kingdom of Bonny
- Bonoman
- Bornu – Bornu Empire
- Brakna – Emirate of Brakna
- Brunei – Bruneian Empire
- Buganda – Kingdom of Buganda
- Bukhara – Khanate of Bukhara
- Bulungan – Sultanate of Bulungan
- Bundi – Bundi State
- Bundu
- Bunyoro – Bunyoro-Kitara Kingdom
- Burma – Kingdom of Burma
- Burundi – Kingdom of Burundi
- Butuan – Rajahnate of Butuan
- Buzaaya – Buzaaya Chiefdom

=== C ===
- Calicut – Zamorin of Calicut
- Cambodia – Kingdom of Cambodia
- Cayor – Kingdom of Cayor
- Chamba – Chamba State
- Champasak – Kingdom of Champasak
- China – Empire of the Great Qing
- Chitral – State of Chitral
- Circassia
- Comancheria – Nʉmʉnʉʉ Sookobitʉ
- Cooch Behar – Cooch Behar State
- Coorg – Kingdom of Coorg
- Cospaia – Republic of Cospaia
- Cutch – Cutch State

=== D ===
- Dahomey – Kingdom of Dahomey
- Đại Việt – Kingdom of Đại Việt
- Damagaram – Sultanate of Damagaram
- Daniski
- Darfur – Sultanate of Darfur
- Dassa – Dassa Kingdom
- Dathina – Dathina Sheikhdom
- Daura – Daura Emirate
- Dauro – Dauro Kingdom
- Dendi – Dendi Kingdom
- Denmark-Norway – Kingdom of Denmark-Norway
- Derbent – Derbent Khanate
- Dhala – Emirate of Dhala
- Didoya
- Diriyah – Emirate of Diriyah
- Dosso – Dosso Kingdom
- Durdzuketia
- Dutse – Kingdom of Dutse
- Dzungar – Dzungar Khanate

=== E ===
- Elisu – Elisu Sultanate
- Erivan – Erivan Khanate
- Ethiopia – Ethiopian Empire

=== F ===
- Fadhli – Fadhli Sultanate
- Fezzan – Fezzan Sultanate
- Fisakana – Fisakana Kingdom
- Fosdinovo – Marquisate of Fosdinovo
- France – Kingdom of France
- Futa Djallon – Imamate of Futa Djallon

=== G ===
- Ganja – Ganja Khanate
- Garhwal – Garhwal Kingdom
- Garo – Kingdom of Garo
- Gazikumukh – Gazikumukh Khanate
- Geledi – Sultanate of the Geledi
- Genoa – Republic of Genoa
- Gliji
- Gobir
- Gorkha – Kingdom of Gorkha
- Grand-Bassam – Grand-Bassam Kingdom
- Great Britain – Kingdom of Great Britain
- Great Fulo – Empire of Great Fulo
- Gumel – Gumel Emirate

=== H ===
- Habsburg monarchy
- Hadimu – Kingdom of Hadimu
- Hamahame – Sultanate of Hamahame
- Hamamvu – Sultanate of Hamamvu
- Hambuu – Sultanate of Hambuu
- Hanthawaddy – Hanthawaddy Kingdom
- Harar – Emirate of Harar
- Hausa Kingdoms
- Haushabi – Hawshabi Sultanate of Musaymir
- Herat – Emirate of Herat
- Holy Roman Empire – Holy Roman Empire of the German Nation
- Hunza
- Hyderabad – Hyderabad State

=== I ===
- Idoani – Idoani Confederacy
- Igala – Igala Kingdom
- Igbirra
- Ijebu – Ijebu Kingdom
- Ilé-Ifẹ̀ – Ilé-Ifẹ̀ Kingdom
- Imerina – Kingdom of Imerina
- Isandra – Isandra Kingdom
- Isedo – Isedo Kingdom
- Itsandra – Sultanate of Itsandra
- Iwo – Iwo Kingdom

=== J ===
- Jafarabad – Jafarabad State
- Jaintia – Jaintia Kingdom
- Jaipur – Kingdom of Jaipur
- Jaisalmer – Kingdom of Jaisalmer
- Jambi – Sultanate of Jambi
- Janjero – Kingdom of Janjero
- Janjira – Janjira State
- Japan – Tokugawa Shogunate
- Javad – Javad Khanate
- Johor – Johor Sultanate
- Jolof – Kingdom of Jolof
- Joseon – Kingdom of Great Joseon

=== K ===
- Kaabu – Kaabu Empire
- Kabardia – Principality of Kabardia
- Kabasarana
- Kachari – Kachari Kingdom
- Kaffa – Kingdom of Kaffa
- Kafiristan
- Kakheti – Kingdom of Kakheti
- Kakongo – Kingdom of Kakongo
- Kalabari – Kalabari Kingdom
- Kalat – Khanate of Kalat
- Kandy – Kingdom of Kandy
- Kangra – Kangra State
- Kano – Sultanate of Kano
- Kantipur – Kingdom of Kantipur
- Karabakh – Karabakh Khanate
- Karadagh – Karadagh Khanate
- Karagwe – Kingdom of Karagwe
- Kartli – Kingdom of Kartli
- Kasanje – Kasanje Kingdom
- Kathiri – Kathiri State of Seiyun in Hadhramaut
- Katsina – Katsina Emirate
- Kaytak – Principality of Kaytak
- Kazakh – Kazakh Khanate
- Kazembe – Kingdom of Kazembe
- Kebbi – Kebbi Emirate
- Keladi – Keladi Nayaka Kingdom
- Kénédougou – Kénédougou Kingdom
- Ketu
- Khalkhal – Khalkhal Khanate
- Kharan – State of Kharan
- Khardj – Khardj Emirate
- Khasso – Kingdom of Khasso
- Khiva – Khanate of Khiva
- Khoy – Khoy Khanate
- Kilwa – Kilwa Sultanate
- Kirtipur
- Kokand – Khanate of Kokand
- Kombo – Kingdom of Kombo
- Kong – Kong Empire
- Kongo – Kingdom of Kongo
- Konta – Kingdom of Konta
- Kooki – Kingdom of Kooki
- Kota – Kota State
- Koya – Kingdom of Koya
- Kuba – Kuba Kingdom
- Kumaon – Kumaon Kingdom
- Kunduz
- Kutai Kartanegara – Kutai Kartanegara Sultanate
- Kwararafa

=== L ===
- La Dombe – Sultanate of La Dombe
- Ladakh
- Lahej – Sultanate of Lahej
- Lalangina – Lalangina Kingdom
- Lalitpur – Lalitpur Kingdom
- Las Bela
- Loango – Kingdom of Loango
- Lower Yafa – Sultanate of Lower Yafa
- Luang Phrabang – Kingdom of Luang Phrabang
- Luba – Kingdom of Luba
- Lucca – Republic of Lucca
- Lunda – Kingdom of Lunda
- Luuka
- Luwu – Kingdom of Luwu

=== M ===
- Maguindanao – Sultanate of Maguindanao
- Mahra – Mahra State of Qishn and Socotra
- Majeerteen – Majeerteen Sultanate
- Makawanpur
- Makran
- Maku – Maku Khanate
- Mandara – Mandara Kingdom
- Manfuha – Manfuha Sheikhdom
- Manipur – Kingdom of Manipur
- Mankessim – Mankessim Kingdom
- Maore – Sultanate of Maore
- Maragheh – Maragheh Khanate
- Marand – Marand Khanate
- Maratha Empire
- Maravi – Kingdom of Maravi
- Marwar – Kingdom of Marwar
- Massa and Carrara – Duchy of Massa and Carrara
- Masserano – Principality of Masserano
- Mataram – Sultanate of Mataram
- Maymana – Khanate of Maymana
- Mbaku – Sultanate of Mbaku
- Mbude – Sultanate of Mbude
- Mbunda – Mbunda Kingdom
- Mekhtuli – Khanate of Mekhtuli
- Meliau – Sultanate of Meliau
- Menabe – Menabe Kingdom
- Mingrelia – Principality of Mingrelia
- Misl – Sikh Confederacy
- Mitsamihuli – Sultanate of Mitsamihuli
- Modena and Reggio – Duchy of Modena and Reggio
- Monaco – Principality of Monaco
- Montenegro – Prince-Bishopric of Montenegro
- Morocco – Sultanate of Morocco
- Mpororo – Kingdom of Mpororo
- Mrauk U – Kingdom of Mrauk U
- Muang Phuan – Principality of Phuan
- Mughal Empire
- Mukalla
- Muscat – Sultanate of Muscat
- Mutapa – Kingdom of Mutapa
- Mysore – Kingdom of Mysore

=== N ===
- Nakhchivan – Nakhchivan Khanate
- Naples – Kingdom of Naples
- Narjan – Principality of Najran
- Nawanagar – Nawanagar State
- Ndzuwani – Sultanate of Ndzuwani
- Nembe – Nembe Kingdom
- Netherlands – Republic of the Seven United Netherlands
- Ngoyo – Kingdom of Ngoyo
- Niue – Kingdom of Niue-Fekai
- Niumi – Kingdom of Niumi
- Noli – Republic of Noli
- Nri – Kingdom of Nri
- Nungu – Nungu Kingdom

=== O ===
- Òkè-Ìlá Òràngún
- Okrika – Okrika Kingdom
- Oman – Imamate of Oman
- Ondo – Ondo Kingdom
- Onitsha – Kingdom of Onitsha
- Orungu – Kingdom of Orungu
- Osogbo – Osogbo Kingdom
- Ossetia
- Ottoman Empire – Sublime Ottoman State
- Oudh – Kingdom of Oudh
- Oyo – Oyo Empire

=== P ===
- Pagaruyung – Pagaruyung Kingdom
- Palembang – Sultanate of Palembang
- Papal States – State of the Church
- Papekat – Sultanate of Papekat
- Parma – Duchy of Parma and Placentia
- Pasir – Sultanate of Pasir
- Pate – Pate Sultanate
- Perak – Perak Sultanate
- Persia (Afsharid dynasty) – Afsharid Empire
- Persia (Zand dynasty) – Zand Empire (from 1750)
- Poland–Lithuania – Polish–Lithuanian Commonwealth
- Porto-Novo – Kingdom of Porto-Novo
- Portugal – Kingdom of Portugal and the Algarves
- Prussia – Kingdom of Prussia

=== Q ===
- Quba – Quba Khanate

=== R ===
- Ragusa – Republic of Ragusa
- Ramnad – Kingdom of Ramnad
- Rapa Nui – Kingdom of Rapa Nui
- Rohilkhand
- Rozvi – Rozvi Empire
- Russia – Russian Empire
- Rwanda – Kingdom of Rwanda
- (Ryukyu Kingdom) Ryukyu – Ryukyu Kingdom

=== S ===
- Saloum – Kingdom of Saloum
- Sambas – Sultanate of Sambas
- San Marino – Republic of San Marino
- Sanwi – Kingdom of Sanwi
- Sarab – Sarab Khanate
- Sardinia – Kingdom of Sardinia
- Selangor – Selangor Sultanate
- Senarica – Republic of Senarica
- Sennar – Funj Sultanate of Sennar
- Shaib – Sheikhdom of Shaib
- Shaki – Shaki Khanate
- Sharjah – Emirate of Sharjah
- Sheka – Sheka Kingdom
- Shihr
- Shilluk – Shilluk Kingdom
- Shirvan – Shirvan Khanate
- Siak – Sultanate of Siak Sri Indrapura
- Sicily – Kingdom of Sicily
- Sikkim – Kingdom of Sikkim
- Sindh – Sindh State
- Sine – Kingdom of Sine
- Sintang
- Sivaganga – Kingdom of Sivaganga
- Spain – Kingdom of Spain
- Subeihi – Subeihi Sultanate
- Suket – Suket State
- Sulu – Sultanate of Sulu
- Surakarta – Surakarta Sunanate
- Surat – Surat State
- Swaziland – Kingdom of Swaziland
- Sweden – Kingdom of Sweden
- Switzerland – Swiss Confederacy

=== T ===
- Tabasaran – Principality of Tabasaran
- Tabriz – Tabriz Khanate
- Tadjourah – Tadjourah Sultanate
- Tagant – Emirate of Tagant
- Talysh – Talysh Khanate
- Tamatave – Tamatave Kingdom
- Tambora – Sultanate of Tambora
- Tananarive – Tananarive Kingdom
- Tarki – Shamkhalate of Tarki
- Tenkodogo
- Terengganu – Terengganu Sultanate
- Tidore – Sultanate of Tidore
- Tonga – Tu'i Tonga Empire
- Torriglia – Marquisate of Torriglia
- Trarza – Emirate of Trarza
- Travancore – Kingdom of Travancore
- Twipra – Twipra Kingdom

=== U ===
- Udaipur – Kingdom of Udaipur
- Unyanyembe
- Upper Yafa – Sheikhdom of Upper Yafa
- Urmia – Urmia Khanate
- Uvea – Kingdom of Uvea

=== V ===
- Venice – Republic of Venice
- Vientiane – Kingdom of Vientiane

=== W ===
- Waalo – Kingdom of Waalo
- Wadai – Sultanate of Wadai
- Wahidi – Wahidi Sultanate
- Wanga – Kingdom of Wanga
- Warri – Kingdom of Warri
- Warsangali – Warsangali Sultanate
- Washili – Sultanate of Washili
- Welayta – Kingdom of Welayta
- Wogodogo – Kingdom of Wogodogo

=== Y ===
- Yauri – Yauri Emirate

=== Z ===
- Zamfara – Zamfara Kingdom
- Zanjan – Zanjan Khanate
- Zazzau – Zazzau Kingdom

== States claiming sovereignty ==
- Couto Misto
