= List of sovereign states in the 1790s =

This is a list of sovereign states in the 1790s, giving an overview of states around the world during the period between 1 January 1790 and 31 December 1799. It contains entries, arranged alphabetically, with information on the status and recognition of their sovereignty. It includes widely recognized sovereign states, and entities which were de facto sovereign but which were not widely recognized by other states.

== Sovereign states ==
Name and capital city	Information on status and recognition of sovereignty
=== A ===
Anhalt-Bernburg – Principality of Anhalt-Bernburg; Capital: Bernburg	State of the Holy Roman Empire.
Anhalt-Köthen – Principality of Anhalt-Köthen; Capital: Köthen	State of the Holy Roman Empire.
Austria – Archduchy of Austria; Capital: Vienna	State of the Holy Roman Empire. Crown land of the Habsburg monarchy.
Avar – Avar Khanate; Capital: Khunzakh	Widely recognized state.
=== B ===
Beni Abbas – Kingdom of the Ait Abbas; Capital: Kalâa of Ait Abbas	Widely recognized state.
Bohemia – Kingdom of Bohemia; Capital: Prague	Crown land of the Bohemian Crown and of the Habsburg monarchy. Imperial State of the Holy Roman Empire.
Boina – Kingdom of Boina; Capital: Boina Bay	Widely recognized state.
Bouillon (to October 26, 1795); Capital: Bouillon: Duchy of Bouillon (to April 24, 1794); Republic of Bouillon (from April 24, 1794 to October 26, 1795)	Widely recognized state to October 26, 1795. Annexed by on October 26, 1795
Brabant – Duchy of Brabant (to 1794); Capital: Brussels	State of the Holy Roman Empire
=== C ===
China – Great Qing; Capital: Peking	Widely recognized state.
Cisalpine Republic (from June 29, 1797); Capital: Milan	Widely recognized state from June 29, 1797. Sister Republic of France.
Cispadane Republic (from May 10, 1796 to June 29, 1797); Capital: Milan	Widely recognized state. Client state of France until June 29, 1797. Annexed by the Cisalpine Republic on June 29, 1797.
Comancheria – Nʉmʉnʉʉ Sookobitʉ
Cospaia – Republic of Cospaia; Capital: Cospaia	Widely recognized state.
Couto Misto; Capital: Santiago de Rubiás	A microstate between Portugal and Spain.
=== D ===
Darfur – Sultanate of Darfur; Capital: Al Fasher	Widely recognized state.
=== F ===
→ → France; Capital: Paris: Kingdom of France (until September 22, 1792); French Republic (from September 22, 1792)	Widely recognized state.
=== G ===
Georgia – Kingdom of Kartli-Kakheti; Capital: Tbilisi	Widely recognized state.
Great Britain – Kingdom of Great Britain; Capital: London	Widely recognized state.
=== H ===
Herat – Herat Khanate (from 1793); Capital: Herat	Widely recognized state from 1793.
Holy Roman Empire; Capital: Vienna (seat of the Aulic Council), Frankfurt, Regensburg	Widely recognized state.
=== I ===
Ireland – Kingdom of Ireland; Capital: Dublin	Widely recognized state.
=== K ===
Korea – Kingdom of Great Joseon; Capital: Hanseong	Widely-recognized state; member of the Imperial Chinese tributary system.
=== L ===
Lippe – Principality of Lippe; Capital: Detmold	State of the Holy Roman Empire.
Lucca – Republic of Lucca; Capital: Lucca	Widely recognized state until February 1799. De facto independent state from February 1799.
=== M ===
Maimana – Khanate of Maimana; Capital: Maymana	Widely-recognized independent state.
Montenegro – Prince-Bishopric of Montenegro; Capital: Cetinje	Widely-recognized independent state.
Moravia – Margraviate of Moravia; Capital: Brno	Crown land of the Bohemian Crown and of the Habsburg monarchy. Imperial State of the Holy Roman Empire.
Morocco – Sultanate of Morocco; Capital: Fez	Widely-recognized independent state.
=== N === Naples – Kingdom of Naples and Sicily; Capital: Naples Najran – Principality of Najran; Capital: Najran Nepal – Kingdom of Nepal; Capital: Kathmandu Netherlands – Republic of the Seven United Netherlands === O === Oldenburg – Duchy of Oldenburg; Capital: Oldenburg Ottoman Empire; Capital: Constantinople Osnabrück – Prince-Bishopric of Osnabrück; Capital: Osnabrück Oyo Empire; Capital: Oyo-Ile === P ===
Parma – Duchy of Parma and Piacenza; Capital: Parma	State of the Holy Roman Empire.
Prussia – Kingdom of Prussia; Capital: Berlin	State of the Holy Roman Empire.
→ Persia – Sublime State of Persia; Capital: Tehran	Widely-recognized independent state.
Papal States – State of the Church; Capital: Rome	Widely-recognized independent state.
=== R ===
Russia – Russian Empire; Capital: Saint Petersburg	Widely-recognized independent state.
=== S ===
→ San Marino – Most Serene Republic of San Marino; Capital: San Marino	Widely-recognized independent state.
Siam – Kingdom of Siam; Capital: Bangkok	Widely-recognized independent state.
Spain – Spanish Empire; Capital: Madrid	Widely-recognized independent state.
=== U ===
→ United States – United States of America; Capital: Philadelphia (temporary capital; from 1790)	Widely-recognized independent state.
=== V ===
Venice – Most Serene Republic of Venice (to October 18, 1797); Capital: Venice	Widely recognized state. Annexed by Austria and the Cisalpine Republic on October 18, 1797.
