= List of sovereign states in the 1760s =

== Sovereign states ==
=== A ===
- Alipura – Alipura
- Algiers – Sultanate of Algiers
- Andorra – Principality of Andorra
- Arakan - Kingdom of Mrauk U
- Ashanti – Asante Union
- Assam – Kingdom of Assam

=== B ===
- Bamana – Bamana Empire
- Benin – Benin Empire
- Brunei – Sultanate of Brunei
- Bhutan – Kingdom of Bhutan
- Bukhara – Khanate of Bukhara
- Burma – Kingdom of Burma

=== C ===
- Cayor – Kingdom of Cayor
- China – Great Qing
- Chitral – Kingdom of Chitral under the Katoor Dynasty
- Comancheria – Nʉmʉnʉʉ Sookobitʉ
- Cospaia – Republic of Cospaia
- Crimea – Crimean Khanate

=== D ===
- Darfur – Sultanate of Darfur
- Dendi – Dendi Kingdom
- Denmark–Norway – United Kingdoms of Denmark and Norway
- Durrani – Durrani Empire
- Dutch Republic – Republic of the Seven United Netherlands

=== E ===
- Ethiopia – Empire of Ethiopia

=== F ===
- France – Kingdom of France

=== G ===
- Garo – Kingdom of Garo
- Genoa – Republic of Genoa
- Great Britain

=== H ===
- Holy Roman Empire – Holy Roman Empire of the German Nation
- Hungary – Kingdom of Hungary

=== I ===
- Ijebu – Kingdom of Ijebu

=== J ===
- Janjero – Kingdom of Janjero
- Japan – Tokugawa shogunate
- Johor – Johor Sultanate
- Jolof – Jolof Empire

=== K ===
- Kaffa – Kingdom of Kaffa
- Kartli-Kakheti – Kingdom of Kartli–Kakheti
- Kazakh – Kazakh Khanate
- Khiva – Khanate of Khiva
- Korea – Kingdom of Great Joseon
- Kokand – Khanate of Kokand
- Kongo – Kingdom of Kongo
- Koya – Kingdom of Koya
- Kuba – Kuba Kingdom

=== L ===
- Lucca – Republic of Lucca

=== M ===
- Malta – Order of Saint John
- Maratha – Maratha Empire
- Massa – Duchy of Massa and Carrara
- Mindanao – Sultanate of Maguindanao
- Modena – Duchies of Modena and Reggio
- Moldavia – Principality of Moldavia - vassal of Ottoman Empire
- Monaco – Principality of Monaco
- Morocco – Sultanate of Morocco
- Mrauk U – Kingdom of Mrauk U
- Muang Phuan – Principality of Muang Phuan
- Mysore – Kingdom of Mysore

=== N ===
- Naples – Kingdom of Naples and Sicily
- Narjan – Principality of Najran
- Nepal – Gorkha Kingdom of Nepal
- Ngoyo – Kingdom of Ngoyo

=== O ===
- Ottoman Empire – Sublime Ottoman State
- Ouaddai Empire – Ouaddai Empire

=== P ===
- Papal States – States of the Church
- Parma – Duchy of Parma and Placentia
- Persia – Persian Empire
- Piombino – Principality of Piombino
- Polish–Lithuanian Commonwealth
- Portugal – Kingdom of Portugal
- Prussia – Kingdom of Prussia

=== R ===
- Ragusa – Republic of Ragusa
- Rapa Nui – Kingdom of Rapa Nui
- Rozwi – Rozwi Empire
- Russia – Russian Empire
- Ryūkyū – Kingdom of Ryūkyū

=== S ===
- Samoa – Kingdom of Samoa
- San Marino – Most Serene Republic of San Marino
- Sarab – Khanate of Sarab
- Sardinia – Kingdom of Sardinia
- Sennar – Funj sultanate of Sinnar
- Spain – Kingdom of Spain
- Sikh – Sikh Confederacy
- Sulu – Sulu Sultanate
- Sweden – Kingdom of Sweden
- Switzerland – Swiss Confederation

=== T ===
- Thonburi – Kingdom of Thonburi
- Tonga – Tu'i Tonga
- Tuscany – Grand Duchy of Tuscany

=== V ===
- Venice – Most Serene Republic of Venice

=== W ===
- Waalo – Kingdom of Waalo
- Wallachia – Principality of Wallachia

== Non-sovereign territories ==
=== Great Britain ===
- British America – British America and the British West Indies

=== Netherlands ===
- Dutch Cape Colony – Cape Colony

== States claiming sovereignty ==
- Aceh – Sultanate of Aceh
- Corsica – Corsican Republic (to May 1769)
- Kashmir – Kingdom of Kashmir (to October 1762)
