= List of sovereign states in the 1640s =

== Sovereign states ==
=== A ===
- Abkhazia – Principality of Abkhazia
- Aceh – Sultanate of Aceh
- Andorra – Principality of Andorra
- Ahom – Ahom Kingdom
- Arakkal – Kingdom of Cannanore
- Avar – Avar Khanate
- Ayutthaya – Ayutthaya Kingdom

=== B ===
- Bajhang
- Bastar – Bastar State
- Benin – Benin Empire
- Bhutan – Kingdom of Bhutan
- Bono – Bono state
- Brunei – Sultanate of Brunei
- Bukhara – Khanate of Bukhara
- Burma – Burmese Empire

=== C ===
- Calicut – Zamorin of Calicut
- Cambodia – Kingdom of Cambodia
- Catalonia – Catalan Republic
- Cayor – Kingdom of Cayor
- China – Great Qing Empire
- Chamba – Chamba State
- Champa – Kingdom of Champa
- Chitradurga – Chitradurga Nayak Kingdom
- Chutiya – Chutiya Kingdom
- Circassia
- Cochin – Kingdom of Cochin
- Cooch Behar – Cooch Behar State
- Cospaia – Republic of Cospaia

=== D ===
- Đại Việt – Kingdom of Đại Việt
- Dendi – Dendi Kingdom
- Denmark-Norway – United Kingdoms of Denmark and Norway
- Dhenkanal – Dhenkanal State
- Dremoshong – Kingdom of Dremoshong
- Durdzuki
- Dzungar – Dzungar Khanate

=== E ===
- England – Kingdom of England (in personal union with Scotland)
- Ethiopia – Ethiopian Empire

=== F ===
- France – Kingdom of France

=== G ===
- Garhwal – Garhwal Kingdom
- Garo – Kingdom of Garo
- Gazikumukh – Gazikumukh Khanate
- Genoa – Republic of Genoa
- Gingee – Gingee Nayak Kingdom
- Gorkha – Gorkha Kingdom

=== H ===
- Hawwara
- Hiraab Imamate
- Holy Roman Empire – Holy Roman Empire of the German Nation
  - Austria – Archduchy of Austria
  - Bavaria – Electorate of Bavaria
  - Brandenburg – Margraviate of Brandenburg (in personal union with Prussia)
  - Cologne – Electorate of Cologne
  - Electoral Palatinate – County Palatine of the Rhine
  - Lorraine – Duchy of Lorraine
  - Mainz – Electorate of Mainz
  - Saxony – Electorate of Saxony
  - Trier – Electorate of Trier
  - Württemberg – Duchy of Württemberg

=== I ===
- Ijebu – Ijebu Kingdom
- Iran – Expansive Realm of Iran
- Ireland – Irish Catholic Confederation

=== J ===
- Jaintia – Jaintia Kingdom
- Janjero – Kingdom of Janjero
- Japan – Tokugawa shogunate
- Johor – Sultanate of Johor
- Jolof – Kingdom of Jolof
- Jumla

=== K ===
- Kabardia – Principality of Kabardia
- Kachar – Kachari Kingdom
- Kaffa – Kingdom of Kaffa
- Kalahandi – Kalahandi State
- Kalmyk – Kalmyk Khanate
- Kangleipak – Kangleipak State
- Kangra – Kangra State
- Kandy – Kingdom of Kandy
- Kanker – Kanker State
- Kazakh – Kazakh Khanate
- Keladi – Keladi Nayak Kingdom
- Keonjhar – Keonjhar State
- Khiva – Khanate of Khiva
- Khoshut – Khoshut Khanate
- Kongo – Kingdom of Kongo
- Korea – Kingdom of Joseon
- Koya – Kingdom of Koya
- Kuba – Kuba Kingdom
- Kumaon – Kumaon Kingdom

=== L ===
- Lan Na – Lan Na Kingdom
- Lo – Kingdom of Lo
- Lucca – Republic of Lucca

=== M ===
- Madurai – Madurai Nayak dynasty
- Malta – Order of Saint John
- Mantua – Duchy of Mantua
- Massa – Principality of Massa
- Masserano – Principality of Masserano
- Mayurbhanj – Mayurbhanj State
- Modena – Duchy of Modena and Reggio
- Monaco – Principality of Monaco
- Montferrat – Duchy of Montferrat
- Morocco – Saadi Sultanate
- Mrauk U – Kingdom of Mrauk U
- Mughal Empire
- Mysore – Kingdom of Mysore

=== N ===
- Narjan – Principality of Najran
- Ndongo – Kingdom of Ndongo
- Nepal – Malla dynasty of Nepal
- Netherlands – Republic of the Seven United Netherlands
- Ngoyo – Kingdom of Ngoyo
- Noli – Republic of Noli

=== O ===
- Odanad
- Oman – Imamate of Oman
- Ossetia
- Ottoman Empire – Sublime Ottoman State
- Oyo – Oyo Empire

=== P ===
- Papal States – State of the Church
- Parma – Duchy of Parma
- Patna – Patna State
- Piombino – Principality of Piombino
- Poland–Lithuania – Polish–Lithuanian Commonwealth
- Portugal – Kingdom of Portugal
- Prussia – Duchy of Prussia (in personal union with Brandenburg)

=== R ===
- Ragusa – Republic of Ragusa
- Russia – Tsardom of Russia
- Ryukyu – Ryukyu Kingdom

=== S ===
- San Marino – Republic of San Marino
- Savoy – Duchy of Savoy
- Scotland – Kingdom of Scotland (in personal union with England)
- Seborga – Principality of Seborga
- Senarica – Republic of Senarica
- Sennar – Funj sultanate of Sinnar
- Sonepur – Sonepur State
- Southern Ming – Great Ming Empire
- Spain – Monarchy of Spain (Note: Philip IV sometimes used the title of "King of Spain", but actually ruled over a dynastic union consisting of the Crown of Aragon (at the same time a dynastic union of Aragon, Catalonia, Valencia, Mallorca, Naples, Sardinia, and Sicily), the Crown of Castile (Castile and León) and the Spanish Netherlands. This empire did not have a national flag in 1648.)
- Suket – Suket State
- Sulu – Sultanate of Sulu
- Sweden – Swedish Empire
- Switzerland – Swiss Confederacy

=== T ===
- Tarki – Shamkhalate of Tarki
- Thanjavur – Thanjavur Nayak Kingdom
- Torriglia – Marquisate of Torriglia
- Tuscany – Grand Duchy of Tuscany
- Twipra – Twipra Kingdom

=== V ===
- Venad
- Venice – Most Serene Republic of Venice

=== Y ===
- Yarkent – Yarkent Khanate
- Yemen – Zaidi Imamate

== Non-sovereign territories ==
=== England ===
- English America
