= Hassaïne =

Hassaïne may refer to:

- El Hassaine, a town and commune in Mostaganem Province, Algeria
- Mohamed Hassaïne (1945–1994), an Algerian journalist
