= List of sovereign states in the 1660s =

Sovereign states existing during the 1660s, listed below, included empires, kingdoms, sultanates, republics, principalities, khanates, and other polities. States that existed for only part of the decade are also included.

== Sovereign states ==
=== A ===
- Aceh - Sultanate of Aceh
- Ahom - Ahom Kingdom
- Algiers - Sultanate of Algiers
- Andorra - Principality of Andorra
- Ankole - Kingdom of Ankole
- Anziku - Anziku Kingdom
- Aragon - Kingdom of Aragon
- Arakan - Kingdom of Arakan
- Asahan - Sultanate of Asahan
- Ayutthaya - Kingdom of Ayutthaya

=== B ===
- Bacan - Sultanate of Bacan
- Badakhshan - Khanate of Badakhshan
- Badung - Kingdom of Badung
- Bamberg - Prince-Bishopric of Bamberg
- Bamoun - Bamoun Sultanate
- Bangkalan - State of Bangkalan
- Banjarmasin - Sultanate of Banjarmasin
- Banten - Sultanate of Banten
- Basel - Prince-Bishopric of Basel
- Bemba - Bemba Kingdom
- Benin - Benin Empire
- Bhadgaon - Kingdom of Bhadgaon
- Bhutan - Bhutan
- Bijapur - Bijapur Sultanate
- Bijayapur - Bijayapur Kingdom
- Bila - Bila Sultanate
- Bima - Sultanate of Bima
- Bone - Sultanate of Bone
- Brunei - Sultanate of Brunei
- Buganda - Kingdom of Buganda
- Bukhara - Khanate of Bukhara
- Buleleng - Kingdom of Buleleng
- Bunyoro - Kingdom of Bunyoro-Kitara
- Burma - Kingdom of Burma
- Burundi - Kingdom of Burundi
- Buton - Sultanate of Buton
- Butua - Kingdom of Butua

=== C ===
- Cambodia - Kingdom of Cambodia
- Catalonia - Principality of Catalonia
- China - Great Qing Empire
- Chitradurga - Chitradurga Nayak Kingdom
- Chitral - Kingdom of Chitral under the Katoor Dynasty
- Cianjur - State of Cianjur
- Cirebon - Sultanate of Cirebon
- Cospaia - Republic of Cospaia
- Cossack Hetmanate - Zaporizhian Host
- Crimea - Crimean Khanate

=== D ===
- Dahomey - Kingdom of Dahomey
- Dauro - Kingdom of Dauro
- Dendi - Kingdom of Dendi
- Denmark - Kingdom of Denmark and Norway
- Dutch Republic - Republic of the Seven United Netherlands

=== E ===
- England, Scotland and Ireland - Commonwealth of England, Scotland and Ireland (to May 8, 1660)
- Ennarea - Kingdom of Ennarea
- Ethiopia - Empire of Ethiopia

=== F ===
- France - Kingdom of France

=== G ===
- Garo - Kingdom of Garo
- Geneva - Republic of Geneva
- Genoa - Most Serene Republic of Genoa
- Gianyar - Kingdom of Gianyar
- Golconda - Golconda Sultanate
- Gorkha - Kingdom of Gorkha
- Gowa - Sultanate of Gowa
- Great Britain/Union of Crowns (from May 8, 1660)

=== H ===
- Harar - Sultanate of Harar
- Holy Roman Empire - Holy Roman Empire
- Hungary - Kingdom of Hungary
- Hunza - Principality of Hunza

=== I ===
- Imereti - Kingdom of Imereti
- Ireland - Kingdom of Ireland (from May 8, 1660)
- Itza - Kingdom of the Itza Maya

=== J ===
- Jambi - Sultanate of Jambi
- Janjero - Kingdom of Janjero
- Japan - Tokugawa shogunate
- Jaxa
- Jimma - Kingdom of Jimma
- Johor-Riau - Sultanate of Johor-Riau

=== K ===
- Kaffa - Kingdom of Kaffa
- Kakheti - Kingdom of Kakheti
- Kalat - Khanate of Kalat
- Kampong Raja - Sultanate of Kampong Raja
- Karagwe - Kingdom of Karagwe
- Kartli - Kingdom of Kartli
- Kashgar - Khanate of Kashgar
- Kathmandu - Kingdom of Kathmandu
- Kazakh Khanate - Kazakh Khanate
- Kedah - Negeri Kedah Darul Aman (to September)
- Keladi - Keladi Nayaka Kingdom
- Khiva - Khanate of Khiva
- Klungkung - Kingdom of Klungkung
- Kongo - Kingdom of Kongo
- Konta - Kingdom of Konta
- Korea - Kingdom of Joseon
- Kota Pinang - Sultanate of Kota Pinang

=== L ===
- Ladakh - Kingdom of Ladakh
- (Laos) Lan Xang - Kingdom of Lan Xang
- Landak - State of Landak
- Limbangan - State of Limbangan (from 1660)
- Loango - Kingdom of Loango
- Luba - Luba Empire
- Lucca - Republic of Lucca
- Lunda - Lunda Kingdom
- Luwu - Kingdom of Luwu

=== M ===
- Madurai - Madurai Nayak Kingdom
- Mainz - Archbishopric of Mainz
- Majeerteen - Sultanate of Majeerteen
- Malta - Order of Saint John
- Mandara - Mandara Kingdom
- Mantua - Duchy of Mantua
- Mataram - Mataram Sultanate
- Milan - Duchy of Milan
- Minangkabau - Minangkabau Kingdom
- Mindanao - Sultanate of Maguindanao
- Mingrelia - Principality of Mingrelia
- Modena - Duchy of Modena and Reggio
- Mogadishu - Sultanate of Mogadishu
- Moldavia - Principality of Moldavia
- Mongolia - Mongolian Empire
- Morocco - Sultanate of Morocco (from 1666)
- Mrauk U - Kingdom of Mrauk U
- Mughal Empire - Mughal Empire
- Muscat - Sultanate of Muscat
- Mustang - Kingdom of Mustang
- Mutapa - Kingdom of Mutapa
- Mysore - Kingdom of Mysore

=== N ===
- Nagar - Principality of Nagar
- Naning - State of Naning
- Naples - Kingdom of Naples
- Narjan – Principality of Najran
- Norway - Kingdom of Norway (Province of Denmark, nominally in personal union)

=== O ===
- Ottoman Empire - Ottoman Empire
- Oyo - Oyo Empire

=== P ===
- Pahang - Negeri Pahang Darul Makmur
- Palembang - Sultanate of Palembang Darussalam
- Papal States - States of the Church
- Papekat - Sultanate of Papekat (from 1660)
- Parma - Duchy of Parma and Piacenza
- Passau - Bishopric of Passau
- Patan - Kingdom of Patan
- Pattani Kingdom - Sultanate of Pattani and Kelantan
- Perak - Negeri Perak Darur Ridzwan
- Persia - Persian Empire
- Polish–Lithuanian Commonwealth
- Portugal - Kingdom of Portugal
- Prussia - Duchy of Prussia

=== R ===
- Ragusa - Republic of Ragusa
- Rapa Nui - Kingdom of Rapa Nui
- Rembau - State of Rembau
- Russia - Tsardom of Russia
- Rwanda - Kingdom of Rwanda

=== S ===
- Sambas - Sultanate of Sambas
- Salé - Republic of Salé
- Samoa - Kingdom of Samoa
- San Marino - Most Serene Republic of San Marino
- Sanggau - Sultanate of Sanggau
- Sardinia - Kingdom of Sardinia
- Savoy - Duchy of Savoy
- Sekadau - Sultanate of Sekadau
- Selambau - State of Selambau
- Sheka - Kingdom of Sheka
- Sicily - Kingdom of Sicily
- Sikkim - Kingdom of Sikkim
- Soppeng - Kingdom of Soppeng
- Southern Ming - Great Ming Empire
- Spain - Monarchy of Spain (Note: Philip IV had the title of "King of Spain", but actually ruled over a dynastic union consisting of the Crown of Aragon (Aragon, Valencia, Catalonia, Mallorca, Naples, Sardinia, and Sicily) and the Crown of Castile (Castile and León). Spain did not have a national flag in 1660.)
- Stavelot-Malmedy - Imperial Abbey of Stavelot and Malmedy
- Sukapura - State of Sukapura
- Sukadana - Sultanate of Sukadana
- Sulu - Sultanate of Sulu
- Sumbawa - Sultanate of Sumbawa
- Sumedang - State of Sumedang
- Sumenep - State of Sumenep
- Sweden - Kingdom of Sweden
- Switzerland - Swiss Confederacy

=== T ===
- Tallo - Sultanate of Tallo
- Tanette - State of Tanette
- Ternate - Sultanate of Ternate
- Thanjavur - Thanjavur Nayak Kingdom
- Tibet - Kingdom of Tibet
- Tidore - Sultanate of Tidore
- Tonga - Tu'i Tonga
- Tonkin - Great Viet Realm
- Transylvania - Principality of Transylvania
- Tuggurt - Sultanate of Tuggurt
- Turpan - Khanate of Turpan
- Tuscany - Grand Duchy of Tuscany

=== V ===
- Valencia - Kingdom of Valencia
- Venice - Most Serene Republic of Venice
- Viet Nam (Dai Viet) - Later Le Dynasty

=== W ===
- Wajo - State of Wajo
- Wallachia - Principality of Wallachia
- Welayta - Kingdom of Welayta

== Non-sovereign territories ==
=== England ===
- English America
