= List of sovereign states in the 1770s =

== Sovereign states ==
=== A ===
- Algiers – Sultanate of Algiers
- Alipura – Alipura
- Andorra – Principality of Andorra
- Anhalt – Principality of Anhalt
- Annam – Empire of Annam
- Ansbach – Principality of Ansbach
- Arakan – Kingdom of Arakan
- Ashanti – Asante Union
- Assam – Kingdom of Assam
- Atjeh – Aceh Sultanate
- Austria – Archduchy of Austria

=== B ===
- Baden – Margraviate of Baden
- Bailundo – Kingdom of Bailundo (to 1770)
- Bali – Kingdom of Bali
- Bamana – Bamana Empire
- Banten – Sultanate of Banten
- (Kingdom of Bavaria) Bavaria – Duchy of Bavaria
- Benin – Benin Empire
- Bhonsle – Kingdom of Bhonsle
- Bhutan – Kingdom of Bhutan
- Bornu – Bornu Empire
- Brunei – Sultanate of Brunei
- Brunswick – Brunswick-Wolfenbüttel
- Bukhara – Khanate of Bukhara
- Burma – Kingdom of Burma

=== C ===
- Carnatic – Kingdom of Carnatic
- Cayor – Kingdom of Cayor
- Champa – Kingdom of Champa
- Champasak – Kingdom of Champasak
- China – Great Qing Empire
- Cologne – Electorate of Cologne
- Comancheria – Nʉmʉnʉʉ Sookobitʉ
- Cospaia – Republic of Cospaia
- Crimea – Crimean Khanate

=== D ===
- Dendi – Dendi Kingdom
- Denmark–Norway – United Kingdoms of Denmark and Norway
- Durrani – Durrani Empire

=== E ===
- Ethiopia – Ethiopian Empire

=== F ===
- France – Kingdom of France

=== G ===
- Gakhar – Kingdom of Gakhar
- Garo – Kingdom of Garo
- Georgia – Kingdom of Kartli-Kakheti
- Genoa – Republic of Genoa

=== H ===
- Hamburg – Free and Hanseatic City of Hamburg
- Hanover – Electorate of Hanover
- Hausa – Hausa Tribe
- Hedjaz – Sultanate of Hedjaz
- Hesse – Landgraviate of Hesse
- Holstein – Duchy of Holstein
- Hungary – Kingdom of Hungary
- Hyderābād – Princely state of the British Raj

=== I ===
- Ijebu – Kingdom of Ijebu
- Ireland – Kingdom of Ireland

=== J ===
- Janjero – Kingdom of Janjero
- Japan – Tokugawa shogunate
- Johor – Johor Sultanate
- Jolof – Jolof Empire

=== K ===
- Kaffa – Kingdom of Kaffa
- Kanem Bornu – Kanem Bornu Empire
- Kazakh – Kazakh Khanate
- Khiva – Khanate of Khiva
- Khmer – Srok Khmer
- Kokand – Khanate of Kokand
- (Sovereign Military Order of Malta) Knights Hospitaller – Sovereign Order of Saint John of Jerusalem of Rhodes and of Malta, Knights of Malta, Knights of Rhodes, and Chevaliers of Malta
- Kongo – Kingdom of Kongo
- Korea – Kingdom of Great Joseon
- Koya – Kingdom of Koya
- Kuba – Kuba Kingdom
- Kurland – Duchy of Kurland

=== L ===
- Liège – Prince-Bishopric of Liège
- Loango – Kingdom of Loango
- Luang Prabang – Kingdom of Luang Prabang

=== M ===
- Madurai – Kingdom of Madurai
- Maharashtra – Kingdom of Maharashtra
- Mainz – Archbishopric of Mainz
- Malacca – Sultanate of Malacca
- Malta – Order of Saint John
- Manipur – Kingdom of Manipur
- Maratha – Maratha Empire
- Mataram – Mataram Sultanate
- Mecklenburg – Duchy of Mecklenburg
- Mindanao – Sultanate of Maguindanao
- Modena – Duchies of Modena and Reggio
- Moldavia – Principality of Moldavia
- Monaco – Principality of Monaco
- Montenegro – Prince-Bishopric of Montenegro
- Morocco – Sultanate of Morocco
- Mrauk U – Kingdom of Mrauk U
- Mughal Empire – Mughal Empire
- Mutapa – Empire of Mutapa
- Mysore – Kingdom of Mysore

=== N ===
- Narjan – Principality of Najran
- Nepal – Gorkha Kingdom of Nepal
- Netherlands – Republic of the Seven United Netherlands
- Ngoyo – Kingdom of Ngoyo

=== O ===
- Ottoman Empire – Sublime Ottoman State
- Oudh – Kingdom of Oudh
- Oyo – Oyo Empire

=== P ===
- Electorate of the Palatinate
- Papal States – States of the Church
- Parma – Duchy of Parma
- Persia – Persian Empire
- Polish–Lithuanian Commonwealth – Kingdom of Poland and Grand Duchy of Lithuania
- Portugal
  - Kingdom of Portugal (to 1777)
  - Kingdom of Portugal (from 1777)
- Prussia – Kingdom of Prussia
- Punjab – Punjabi Empire

=== R ===
- Ragusa – Republic of Ragusa
- Rajputana – Kingdom of Rajputana
- Rapa Nui – Kingdom of Rapa Nui
- Rozwi – Rozwi Empire
- Russia – Russian Empire
- Ryūkyū – Kingdom of Ryūkyū

=== S ===
- Salzburg – Archbishopric of Salzburg
- Samoa – Kingdom of Samoa
- San Marino – Most Serene Republic of San Marino
- Sardinia – Kingdom of Sardinia
- Saxony – Electorate of Saxony
- Sennar – Funj sultanate of Sennar
- Sharjah – Emirate of Sharjah
- Shaybanid – Khanate of Shaybanid
- Sicily – Kingdom of Sicily
- Sikh – Sikh Confederacy
- Sind – Sultanate of Sind
- Spain – Kingdom of Spain
- Sulu – Sulu Sultanate
- Swahili – Swahili Tribe
- Sweden
  - Sweden (to August 19, 1772)
  - Kingdom of Sweden (from August 17, 1772)
- Switzerland – Swiss Confederation

=== T ===
- Teutonic Knights – Order of Brothers of the German House of Saint Mary in Jerusalem
- Taungu – Kingdom of Taungu
- Thonburi – Kingdom of Thonburi
- Tirol – County of Tirol
- Tonga – Tu'i Tonga
- Tonkin – Empire of Tonkin
- Travancore – Kingdom of Travancore
- Trier – Archbishopric of Trier
- Tripoli – Sultanate of Tripoli
- Tuscany – Grand Duchy of Tuscany

=== U ===
→ United States

- United Colonies (from July 4, 1776, to September 9, 1776)
- United States (from September 9, 1776)

=== V ===
- Venice – Most Serene Republic of Venice
- Vientiane – Kingdom of Vientiane

=== W ===
- Waalo – Kingdom of Waalo
- Wallachia – Principality of Wallachia
- Württemberg – Duchy of Württemberg
- Würzburg – Bishopric of Würzburg

=== Y ===
- Yemen – Kingdom of Yemen

== Non-sovereign territories ==
=== Great Britain ===
- British America – British America and the British West Indies

=== Netherlands ===
- Dutch Cape Colony – Cape Colony
