= Southern Tibet =

Southern Tibet is a literal translation of the Chinese term "藏南" (pinyin: Zàng Nán), which may refer to different geographic areas:

The southern part of Tibet, covering the middle reaches of the Yarlung Tsangpo River Valley between Saga County to the west and Mainling County to the east, as well as neighbouring areas located between the Himalayas to the south and the Transhimalayas range to the north. The region extends around 1,000 km from west to east and 300 km from north to south. By this definition, Southern Tibet includes most of modern-day Shigatse, Lhasa, Lhoka (Shannan) Prefecture and Nyingchi Prefecture.

Southern Tibet may also refer to a shorter section of the Yarlung Tsangpo and tributaries covering most of Lhoka and Nyingchi Prefectures from the confluence with the Lhasa River to the west up to the beginning of the Yarlung Tsangpo Grand Canyon near Mainling County to the east.

When used in relation to the Sino-Indian border dispute, Southern Tibet is a term mainly used by the People's Republic of China (PRC) and the Republic of China (Taiwan, ROC) to refer to an area south of the McMahon Line, part of the Indian states of Arunachal Pradesh and Assam. This region was recognised by the de facto independent state of Tibet (1912–1951) as belonging to British India under the McMahon Line Agreement (part of the 1914 Simla Convention). The PRC does not recognise the McMahon Line and claims that the area is a part of the Tibet Autonomous Region instead. The Dalai Lama, the head of the Central Tibetan Administration, did not recognize Arunachal Pradesh as part of India until 2003 claiming it part of Tibet. According to Hsiao-ting Lin and other western-backed scholars, both the British and the Chinese claim to sovereignty over the area can be deemed "largely imaginary", reflected only in official maps and political propaganda.
