= Haasa =

Sheikdom in the Arabian peninsula until 1795

The Sheikdom of al-Hassa was an independent tribal region, set up by the Qarāmiṭa in the 10th century. It was situated opposite of Qatar and Bahrain towards the Arabian Peninsula proper, west of Najd and to the south of Kuwait, with its centre in the city of al-Hufūf. It was historically different from its neighbors by having a high concentration of Shi'ites in an otherwise Sunni-dominated area, and the region continues to be predominantly Shi'a to this day (see Basra). With the decline of Persian regional power, the country lost independence to its Sunni neighbors before being ultimately annexed by Najd in 1795 and then the Ottoman Empire in 1818.
