= Abba (given name) =

- Gender: Male
- Language: Semitic language

Origin
- Meaning: Father

Abba is a form of ab, meaning "father" in many Semitic languages. It is used as a given name, but was also used as a title or honorific for religious scholars or leaders. (The word abbot has the same root.)

== Persons with the given name Abba, or who are known by that title ==
=== Jewish religious personalities ===
- Rabbi Abba (3rd-4th century), religious scholar
- Abba of Acre (3rd century), religious scholar
- Abba Arika (175–247), Babylonian religious scholar
- Abba bar Abba (2nd-3rd century), Babylonian religious scholar
- Abba bar Abina (3rd century), Palestinian religious scholar
- Abba bar Zabdai (3rd century), Palestinian religious scholar
- Abba ben Joseph bar Ḥama (270–350), Babylonian religious scholar known in the Talmud as Rava
- Abba Mordechai Berman (1919–2005), Polish rabbi and religious scholar
- Abba Hilkiah (1st century), Hasidic sage
- Abba Hillel Silver (1893–1963), U.S. Rabbi and Zionist leader
- Abba Hoshaya of Turya (3rd century), pious wool-washer
- Abba Jose ben Hanan (1st century), sage and tanna
- Abba Judan (2nd century), philanthropist
- Abba Mari (13th-14th century), French rabbi
- Abba Mari ben Simson Anatoli (c. 1194–1256), French scholar and translator of Arabic texts
- Abba Yudan (3rd century), Palestinian religious scholar
- Raba (Rabbah) Bar Jeremiah (also called "Abba"), Talmudist

=== Jimma rulers ===
- Abba Bok'a (died 1862), a ruler of the Kingdom of Jimma in what is today southwestern Ethiopia
- Abba Gomol, ruler of the Kingdom of Jimma 1862–78; son of Abba Bok'a
- Abba Jifar I (ruled 1830 - c. 1855), king of the Kingdom of Jimma
- Abba Jifar II (ruled 1878–1932), king of the Kingdom of Jimma
- Abba Jofir, Ethiopian aristocrat briefly (1932) king of the Kingdom of Jimma
- Abba Magal (c. 1800), Oromo leader, father of Abba Jifar I, founder of the Kingdom of Jimma

=== Others ===
- Abba (count) (734?–768), Frisian count
- Abba Thulle (fl. 1783), ibedul of Koror
- Abba Ahimeir (1897–1962), Russian Jewish journalist, historian, and Zionist
- Abba Cohen (born 1955/1956), American Orthodox Jewish advocate
- Abba Eban (1915–2002), Israeli diplomat and politician, and President of the Weizmann Institute of Science
- Abba Gerasimus (5th century), Lycian Christian monk and abbot revered as a saint
- Abba Gindin (b. 1946), Finnish/Israeli ice hockey player
- Abba Habib (fl. 1959), Nigerian politician
- Abbot "Abbie" Hoffman (1936–1989), American activist whose Hebrew name was Abba
- Abba Hushi (1898–1969), Israeli politician
- Abba Kovner (1918–1987), Lithuanian/Israeli Jewish poet, writer, and partisan leader
- Abba Kyari (1938–2020), Nigerian military officer, governor, and business leader
- Abba P. Lerner (1903–1982), American economist
- Abba Musa Rimi (b. 1940), Nigerian politician, governor of Kaduna State
- Abba Goold Woolson (1838–1921), American writer

== See also ==
- Avva
