= List of rulers of Jimma =

This article lists the rulers of the Kingdom of Jimma. Jimma was one of the five Oromo kingdoms in the Gibe region of Ethiopia that emerged in the 19th century.

== List ==
Tenure	Incumbent	Notes
c.1790	Foundation of Kaka Jimma
c.1830	Renamed Jimma Abba Jifar
???? to ????	..., Moti (Abba Faro)
c.1800	..., Moti (Abba Magal)
early 19th century	..., Moti (Abba Rago)
c.1830 to c.1855	Sana, Moti (Abba Jifar I)
1855 to 1859	..., Moti (Abba Rebu)
1859 to 1862	..., Moti (Abba Bok'a)
1862 to 1878	..., Moti (Abba Gomol)
1878 to 1932	Tulu, Moti (Abba Jifar II)	Vassal to Shewa in 1884 and subsequently to Ethiopia in 1889. Also known as Muhammad ibn Da´ud
1932	..., Moti (Abba Jofir)
1932	Jimma completely incorporated into Ethiopia

- Moti = Rulers
- Horse names in parentheses

== See also ==
- Monarchies of Ethiopia
- Rulers and heads of state of Ethiopia
- Ethiopian aristocratic and court titles
