= Lists of rulers of Ethiopia =

This is a list of rulers and office-holders of Ethiopia.

== Heads of state ==
- Emperors of Ethiopia
- Presidents of Ethiopia

== Heads of government ==
- Heads of government of Ethiopia

== Heads of subdivisions ==
- Rulers of Bosha
- Rulers of the Gibe State of Limu-'Enarya
- Rulers of the Gibe State of Gera
- Rulers of the Gibe State of Goma
- Rulers of the Gibe State of Guma
- Rulers of the Gibe state of Jimma
- Rulers of the Janjero state of Gimirra
- Rulers of Leqa Naqamte
- Rulers of Shewa
- Rulers of Welayta
- Mudaito dynasty (Awssa Sultanate)
- See also: Monarchies of Ethiopia

== Occupation governors ==
Rulers during 1936–1941 Italian Occupation

- Colonial heads of Italian East Africa
  - Italian Governors of Addis Ababa
  - Italian Governors of Amhara
  - Italian Governors of Galla-Sidama
  - Italian Governors of Harar
  - Italian Governors of Showa

== Heads of former states ==
- Kingdom of Aksum: Kings of Axum
- Kingdom of D`mt

== See also ==
- Ethiopian historiography
- Lists of office-holders
