= Monarchies of Ethiopia =

Monarchies existed throughout Ethiopian history

This is a list of monarchies of Ethiopia that existed throughout the nation's history. It is divided into kingdoms that were subdivisions of Ethiopia, and kingdoms that were later conquered by Ethiopia. Ancient kingdoms fall into neither category.

== Ancient Ethiopia ==
- Dʿmt Kingdom (8th century BC – 7th/5th century BC)
- Kingdom of Aksum – used title Nəguśä nägäśt ("King of Kings") like later Emperors, but traditionally called a Kingdom (Early period 5th/4th century BC – 1st century BC; Main period 1st century BC/AD – 7th century; Late Aksumite period 7th century – 9th/10th/11th/12th? century)

== Medieval Ethiopia (to 1527) ==
- Transition from Aksumite period to Zagwe dynasty somewhere between 9th–12th centuries.
- Transition from Zagwe dynasty to Solomonic dynasty in 1270.

=== Vassal Kingdoms ===
- Bali (later Bale)
- Damot
- Dawaro
- Fatagar
- Gojjam
- Hadiya
- Ifat
- Innarya
- Medri Bahri
- Wag

== Post-1527 Kingdoms ==
=== Independent ===
- Adal Sultanate (until demise in 1577)
- Emirate of Harar - (independent of Aussa Imamate from 1647; ruled by the Ali ibn Dawud dynasty, see Emirs of Harar)

== Kingdoms annexed by the Ethiopian empire in the 19th century ==
- Emirate of Harar
- Kingdom of Garo or Bosha - foundation 1567
  - title: Tatu
  - dynasty: Tegra`i Bushasho dynasty

See: Rulers of Bosha

- Kingdom of Gera
  - title: Moti

See: Rulers of the Gibe State of Gera

- Kingdom of Gomma - foundation 1800
  - title Moti
  - dynasty: 'Awulyani dynasty

See: Rulers of the Gibe State of Goma

- Kingdom of Gumma
  - title Moti

See: Rulers of the Gibe State of Guma

- Kingdom of Janjero - founded before 1600

See: Rulers of the Janjero state of Gimirra

- Kingdom of Jimma
  - title Moti

See: Rulers of the Gibe state of Jimma

- Kingdom of Kaffa - foundation 1390 old Kaffa Kingdom; 1700 for new Kaffa Empire
  - title: Emperor (or Kafi Atio, last two also Atiojo)
  - dynasty: Bushasho dynasty, one of the Minjo families
  - rulers:
    - c.1390 Minjo
    - 1425 - 1460 Shongetato (also known as the Girra king)
    - 1460 - 1495 Odhe/Addiotato
    - 1495 - 1530 Sadi or Shaddi/Shaditato
    - 1530 - 1565 Madi Gafine/Gafo or Shonge, possibly the same as Borrete
    - 1565 - 1605 Bong-he or Borrete or Bongatato, said to be the son of Madi Gafo
    - 1605 - 1640 Giba Nekiok or Bonge or Galo Nechocho
    - 1640 - 1675 Gali Gafocho or Gali Ginok
    - 1675 - 1710 Gali Ginocho or Tan Ginok
    - 1710 - 1742 Gaki Gaocho or Otti Sheroch, Taki Gaok
    - 1742 - 1775 Gali Gaocho or Kanechoch, Galli
    - 1775 - 1795 Shagi Sherocho or Gali Keffoch, Sagi Saro
    - 1795 - 1798 Beshi Ginocho or Kaye Sheroch, Beshi Gino
    - 1798 - 1821 Hoti Gaocho or Beshi Sheroch, Oto
    - 1821 - 1845 Gaha Nechocho or Gali Sheroch, Ganecho
    - 1845 - 1854 Gawi Nechocho or Haji Ginoch, Gaul Saro
    - 1854 - November 1870 Kaye Sherocho or Kamo
    - November 1870 - April 1890 Gali Sherocho
    - 6 April 1890 - 10 September 1897 Gaki Sherocho

Source: C.F. Beckingham and G.W.B. Huntingford, Some Records of Ethiopia, 1593-1646 (London: Hakluyt Society, 1954), p. lvi. Amnon Orent, "Refocusing on the History of Kafa prior to 1897: A Discussion of Political Processes" in African Historical Studies, Vol. 3, No. 2. (1970), p. 268.

- Leqa Naqamte - foundation before 1871, ruled Welega from Nekemte
  - title: Moti
  - rulers:
    - (until mid-1870s) Bakare
    - (mid-1870s)-1889 Moroda
    - 1889-1932 Kumsa Moroda (later known as Gebre Iziabiher)
- Limmu-Ennarea
  - ruling title: Supera

See: Rulers of the Gibe State of Limu-'Enarya; Innarya

- Kingdom of Wolaita - foundation 1250 (not under Tigre dynasty until 1600)
  - ruling title: Kawo
  - ruling dynasty:
    - Tigre dynasty
    - Mala dynasty

See: Rulers of Welayta

== Other ==
Kingdom of Zion (consisting of Tigray, Gondar, Gojjam, and Semien) under King (Negus) Mikael of Wollo 1914 - 1916

== Unidentified kingdoms or chiefdoms ==
The following polities are unidentified kingdoms or chiefdoms, and are not mentioned in standard references:

- Leqa Qellam: foundation before 1870
  - title Moti
  - rulers:
    - x-188? Jote Talu
- Sheka - foundation 1560
  - title: Tato
  - rulers
    - 1670-1740 Bedi Goechi
    - 1740-1780 Giba Goechi
    - 1780-1782 Tuge Nechochi
    - 1782-1785 Tume Afochi
    - 1785-1800 Shagi Nechochi
    - 1800-1805 Bedi Nechochi
    - 1805-1810 Techi Nechochi
    - 1810-1820 unknown
    - 1820-1850 Galli Goechi
    - 1850-1887 Deji Goechi
    - 1887-1898 Techi Goechi

== See also ==
- Solomonic Dynasty
- Rulers of Shewa
- Yejju Oromo
- Zagwe dynasty
- Kingdom of Semien
- Mudaito dynasty
