= Abba Rebu =

King of Kingdom of Jimma from 1855 to 1859

- Moti

King of the Kingdom of Jimma
- Reign: 1855–1859
- Predecessor: Abba Jifar I
- Successor: Abba Bok'a
- Dynasty: Kingdom of Jimma

Moti Abba Rebu was King of the Gibe Kingdom of Jimma, in Ethiopia (reigned 1855–1859). He was the son of Abba Jifar I.

Abba Rebu was a warlike king, and said to have been tyrannical. He defeated his older brother and designated heir Abba Gommol for control of the throne, and exiled him to the Kingdom of Kaffa. Abba Rebu was killed in battle, either fighting against the Kingdom of Gomma who surprised him by bringing soldiers from the kingdoms of Limmu-Ennarea and Gera, or by the treachery of his own subjects.

== Notes ==
Preceded by Abba Jifar I	Kingdom of Jimma	Succeeded by Abba Bok'a
