= List of rulers of Bosha =

The following is a list of rulers of the Kingdom of Garo or Bosha. Bosha was one of the kingdoms on the periphery of the Gibe region of Ethiopia. It existed from 1567 to 1883.

== List of rulers of Bosha or Garo ==
Tenure	Incumbent	Notes
Tato (Rulers)
Tegra`i Bushasho dynasty
1567 to 1600	Ambiraj, Tato	Also known as "Bosha" and possibly "Giyorgis"; Founded Bosha.
1600 to 1630	Magela, Tato
1630 to 1660	Daro, Tato
1660 to 1690	Chowaka, Tato
1690 to 1720	Leliso, Tato
1720 to 1740	Wako, Tato
1740 to 1760	Malko, Tato
1760 to 1780	Gabito, Tato	Deposed
1780 to 1790	Chaso, Tato	Usurper
1790 to 1845	Dukamo, Tato
1845 to 1865	Ogata, Tato
1865 to 1883	Dagoye, Tato
1883	Territory incorporated into the Kingdom of Jimma

== Sources ==
- Werner J. Lange, History of the Southern Gonga (Southwestern Ethiopia) (Wiesbaden: Franz Steiner, 1982), p. 64.

== See also ==
- Monarchies of Ethiopia
- Rulers of Ethiopia
- Rulers and heads of state of Ethiopia
