= Jimma =

Town in Oromia Region, Ethiopia

Jimma Jimmaa
- City
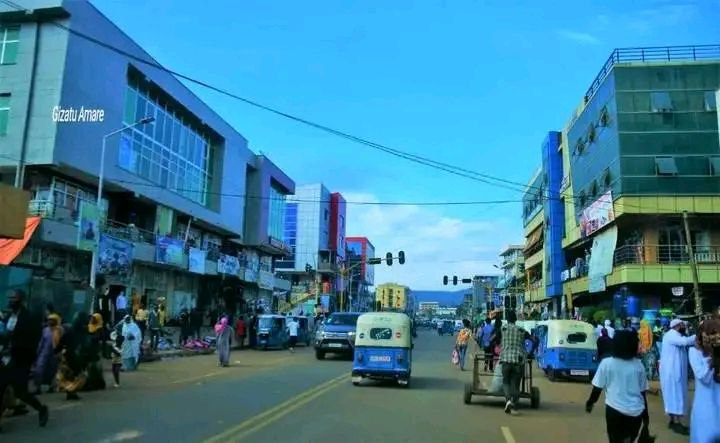
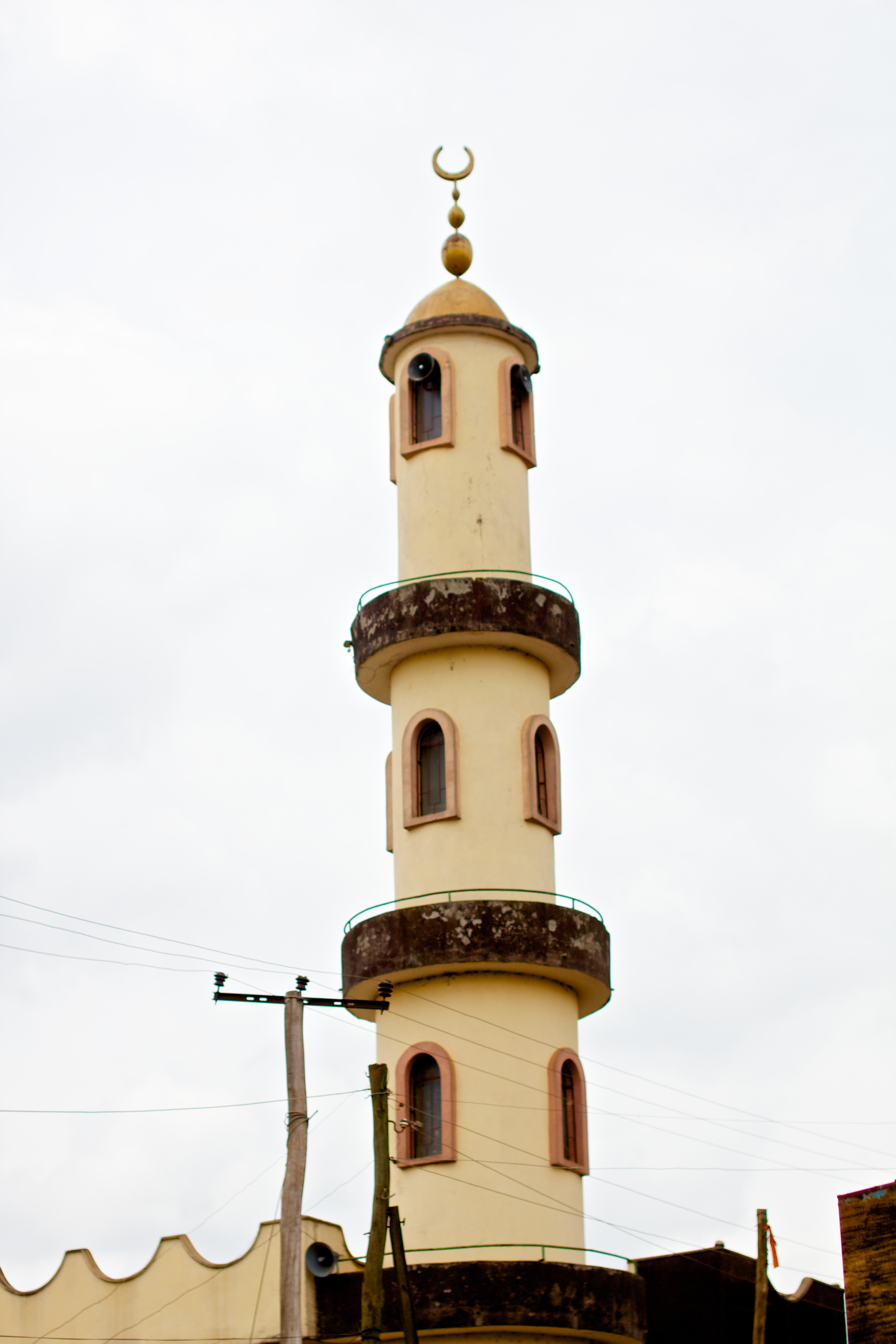
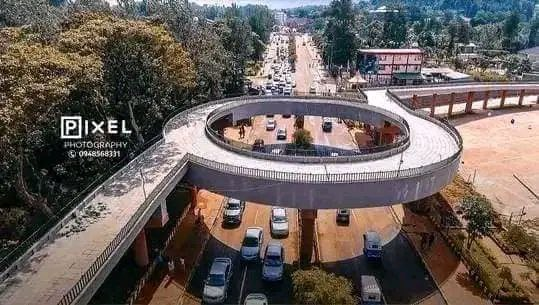
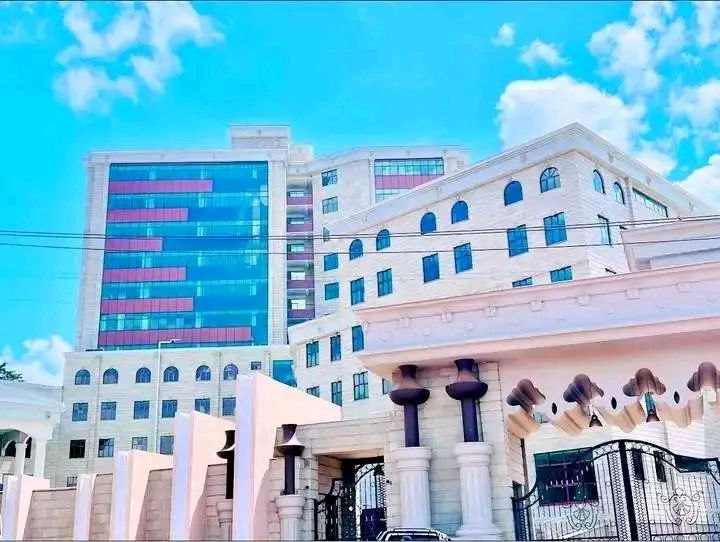
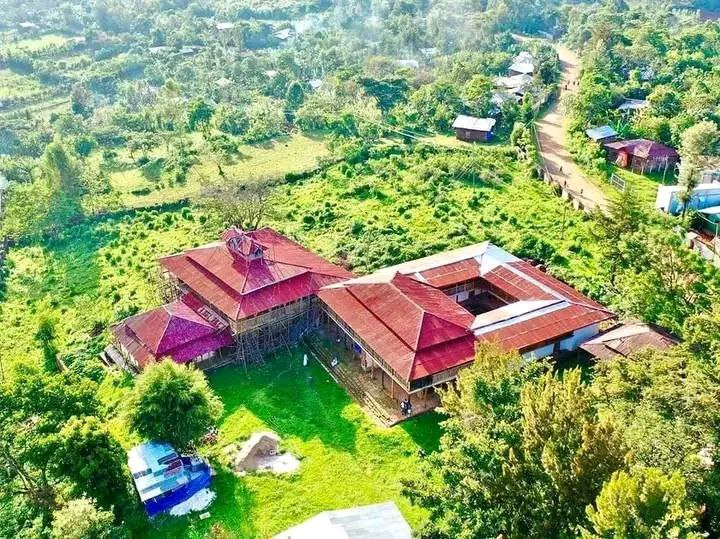
- Scenery in Jimma
- Nickname: Jimmaa Abbaa Jifaar
- Location within Ethiopia Jimma (Africa)
- Coordinates: 7°40′N 36°50′E
- Country: Ethiopia
- Region: (Oromia Region) Oromia
- Zone: Jimma
- Elevation: 1,780 m (5,840 ft)

Population (2007)
  - Total: 207,000
  - Estimate (2021): 239,022
- Time zone: UTC+3 (EAT)
- Area code: 47

Jimma (Oromo: Jimmaa) is the largest city in southwestern Oromia Region, Ethiopia. It is a special zone of the Oromia Region and is surrounded by Jimma Zone. It has a latitude and longitude of 7°40′N 36°50′E. Prior to the 2007 census, Jimma was reorganized administratively as a special Zone.

== History ==
What is now Jimma's northern suburb of Jiren was the capital of the Kingdom of Jimma. Originally named Hirmata, the city owed its importance in the 19th century to being located on the caravan route between Shewa and Kaffa, as well as being only six miles from the palace of Abba Jifar II.

According to Donald Levine, in the early 19th century the market attracted thousands of people from neighboring regions: "Amhara from Gojjam and Shoa, Oromo from all the Gibe Kingdoms and numerous representatives of the Lacustrine and Omotic groups, including Timbaro, Qabena, Kefa, Janjero, Walemo, Konta and several others".

At the very beginning of the 20th century, the German explorer Oscar Neumann visited Jimma on his journey from the Somali coast through Ethiopia to the Sudan. As he observed, “Jimma is almost the richest land of Abyssinia; the inhabitants are pure, well-built Galla; they are nearly all Mohammedans, as is their king, Abba Jifar, a very clever man, who submitted to Menelik at the right time and, therefore, retained his country”

The present town was developed on the Awetu River by the Italian colonial regime in the 1930s. At that time, with the goal of weakening the native Ethiopian Church, the Italians intended to make Jimma an important center of Islamic learning, and founded an academy to teach fiqh. In the East African fighting of World War II after their main force was defeated, the Italian garrison at Jimma was one of the last to surrender, holding out til July 1941.

Following the death of Abba Jifar II of Jimma in 1932, the Kingdom of Jimma was formally absorbed into Ethiopia. During the reorganization of the provinces in 1942, Jimma vanished into Kaffa Province."

Herbert S. Lewis states that in the early 1960s it was "the greatest market in all of south-western Ethiopia. On a good day in the dry season it attracts up to thirty thousand people. Jimma was the scene of a violent encounter which started in April 1975 between radical college students (known as zemacha) sent to organize local peasants, who had benefited from land reform, and local police, who had sided with local landowners. Students and peasant followers had imprisoned local small landowners, rich peasants and members of the local police force; this action led to further unrest, causing the Derg (the ruling junta) to send a special delegation to Jimma, which sided with the local police. In the end, 24 students were killed, more arrested, and the local zemacha camps closed.

Days before the end of the Ethiopian Civil War in May 1991, the city was captured by the Ethiopian People's Revolutionary Democratic Front.

On 13 December 2006, the Ethiopian government announced that it had secured a loan of US$98 million from the African Development Bank to pave the 227 kilometers of highway between Jimma and Mizan Teferi to the southwest. The loan would cover 64% of the 1270.97 million Birr budgeted for this project.

== Climate ==
Jimma has a relatively cool tropical monsoon climate (Köppen Am). It features a long annual wet season from March to October.

Afternoon temperatures at Jimma are very warm year-round, with the daily maximum usually staying between 24 and 27 °C (75.2 and 80.6 °F). Morning temperatures are even more consistent, being at a cool-to-pleasant 12 to 13 °C (53.6 to 55.4 °F) virtually every day.

Climate data for Jimma
Month	Jan	Feb	Mar	Apr	May	Jun	Jul	Aug	Sep	Oct	Nov	Dec	Year
Record high °C (°F)	35.0 (95.0)	35.7 (96.3)	37.7 (99.9)	38.0 (100.4)	34.7 (94.5)	31.1 (88.0)	29.0 (84.2)	28.9 (84.0)	31.6 (88.9)	30.0 (86.0)	31.0 (87.8)	31.6 (88.9)	38.0 (100.4)
Mean daily maximum °C (°F)	28.7 (83.7)	29.7 (85.5)	29.8 (85.6)	28.8 (83.8)	27.9 (82.2)	26.3 (79.3)	24.7 (76.5)	25.0 (77.0)	26.1 (79.0)	27.1 (80.8)	27.8 (82.0)	28.1 (82.6)	27.5 (81.5)
Daily mean °C (°F)	19.0 (66.2)	19.9 (67.8)	21.1 (70.0)	21.2 (70.2)	20.9 (69.6)	20.1 (68.2)	19.2 (66.6)	19.4 (66.9)	19.9 (67.8)	19.6 (67.3)	18.3 (64.9)	18.0 (64.4)	19.7 (67.5)
Mean daily minimum °C (°F)	8.4 (47.1)	9.9 (49.8)	11.8 (53.2)	13.1 (55.6)	13.5 (56.3)	13.6 (56.5)	13.7 (56.7)	13.8 (56.8)	13.5 (56.3)	11.6 (52.9)	9.0 (48.2)	7.7 (45.9)	11.6 (52.9)
Record low °C (°F)	−2.3 (27.9)	0.0 (32.0)	0.0 (32.0)	1.5 (34.7)	4.4 (39.9)	4.3 (39.7)	8.4 (47.1)	7.9 (46.2)	6.0 (42.8)	2.7 (36.9)	0.0 (32.0)	−2.8 (27.0)	−2.8 (27.0)
Average rainfall mm (inches)	38.6 (1.52)	37.1 (1.46)	91.3 (3.59)	129.1 (5.08)	193.8 (7.63)	212.6 (8.37)	213.3 (8.40)	215.6 (8.49)	191.3 (7.53)	116.4 (4.58)	64.5 (2.54)	38.9 (1.53)	1,542.5 (60.72)
Average rainy days (≥ 0.1 mm)	7	9	14	16	19	22	24	25	21	12	7	5	181
Average relative humidity (%)	59	62	63	66	72	76	80	80	77	73	68	64	70
Mean monthly sunshine hours	238.7	194.9	220.1	192.0	207.7	153.0	120.9	148.8	174.0	213.9	237.0	251.1	2,352.1
Mean daily sunshine hours	7.7	6.9	7.1	6.4	6.7	5.1	3.9	4.8	5.8	6.9	7.9	8.1	6.4
Source 1: Ethiopian Meteorological InstituteWorld Meteorological Organisation (rainy days)
Source 2: Deutscher Wetterdienst (mean temperatures 1991–2005, humidity 1959–1982, and sun 1991–2005), Meteo Climat (record highs and lows)

== Points of interest ==
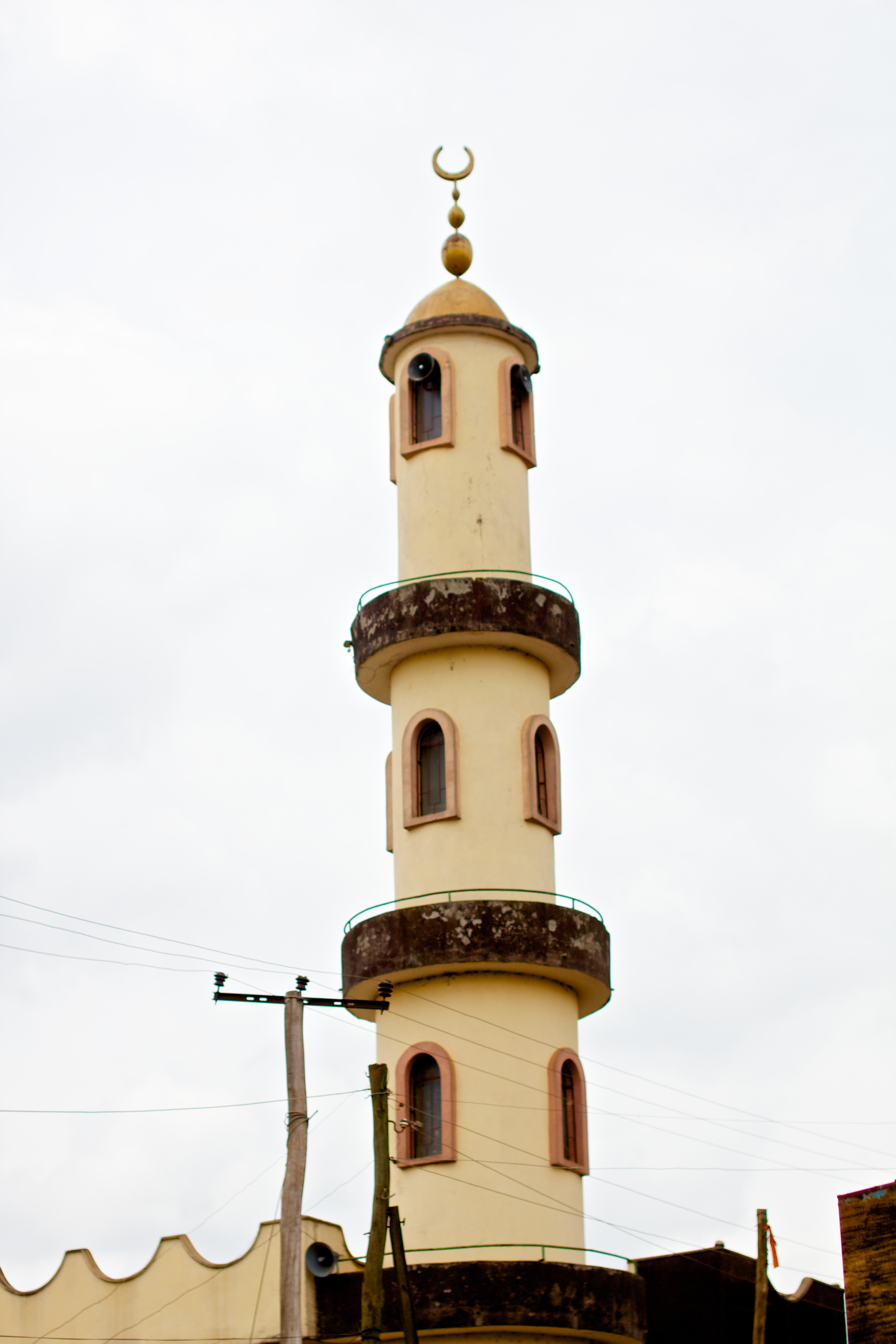
Mosque in Jimma

A few buildings have survived from the time of the Jimma Kingdom, including the Palace of Abba Jifar. The city is home to a museum, Jimma University, several markets, and an airport (ICAO code HAJM, IATA JIM). Also of note is the Jimma Research Center, founded in 1968, which is run by the Ethiopian Institute of Agricultural Research. The Center specializes in agricultural research, including serving as the national center for research to improve the yield of coffee and spices.

== Sports ==
Football is the most popular sport in Jimma. The 50,000-capacity Jimma University Stadium is the largest venue by capacity in Jimma. It is used mostly for football matches.

== Transport ==
Jimma is served by Aba Jifar (Jimma) Airport. The airport completed a renovation in 2015 in order to accommodate larger aircraft and more passengers.

Within the city limits people take bajajs (similar to “tuktuks”) or “line taxis” that are converted mini vans.

== Notable residents ==
- King Abba Jifar I
- King Abba Jifar II
- President Mengistu Haile Mariam (born in Jimma)
- Prime Minister Abiy Ahmed
