= List of rulers of the Gibe state of Gera =

The following is a list of rulers of the Kingdom of Gera. The Gibe kingdom of Gera was one of the kingdoms in the Gibe region of Ethiopia that emerged in the 19th century.

== List of rulers of the Gibe Kingdom of Gera ==
Tenure	Incumbent	Notes
Moti (Rulers) (horse names in parentheses)
(semi-legendary)	Abba Sirba, Moti	(Borana)
(semi-legendary)	Raia, Moti
(semi-legendary)	Macha, Moti	(Borana)
(semi-legendary)	Akako, Moti	(Borana)
(semi-legendary)	Jimma, Moti	(Borana)
(semi-legendary)	Abo, Moti	(Borana)
(semi-legendary)	Saiyo, Moti	(Borana)
(semi-legendary)	Bobo, Moti	(? Bareituma)
killed c. 1840	Tulu Ganje, Moti	killed by Oncho, king of Gumma
c. 1840	..., Moti (Abba Baso)
c. 1845 to c. 1860	..., Moti (Abba Rago I)	reigned 15 years
c. 1860 - 1870	..., Moti (Abba Magal)
c. 1870	..., Moti (Abba Rago II)
c. 1880	Genne Fa (as regent)	Widow of Abba Rago II

== See also ==
- Monarchies of Ethiopia
- Rulers and heads of state of Ethiopia
- Rulers of Ethiopia
- Ethiopian aristocratic and court titles

== Sources ==
- C. F. Beckingham and G. W. B. Huntingford, Some Records of Ethiopia, 1593-1646 (London: Hakluyt Society, 1954), pp. lxxxivf
