= Agaro =

Town in Oromia Region, Ethiopia

Agaro Aggaaroo
- Town
- Location within Ethiopia
- Coordinates: 7°51′21″N 36°35′09″E
- Country: Ethiopia
- Region: Oromia
- Zone: Jimma Zone
- Elevation: 1,560 m (5,120 ft)

Population (2024)
  - Total: 25,458
- Time zone: UTC+3 (EAT)
- Climate: Aw

Agaro (Oromo: Aggaaroo) is a town and separate woreda in south-western Ethiopia. Located in the Jimma Zone of the Oromia Region, it sits at an elevation of 1,560 meters above sea level.

== Overview ==
The road that originally connected Jimma to Agaro was "better known for its depth than for its length" until improvements were completed in 1962. The road to Bedele, 96 km long, was completed in 1968 at a cost of 12 million dollars (Ethiopian), by the French company Razel Frères. Agaro is one of the most important trading centers of coffee in Ethiopia. The Agaro Institute of Public Health (part of Agaro University) operates a teaching center for health care in Agaro.

Agaro was the capital of the former Kingdom of Gomma, until Gomma was conquered by Dejazmach Bashah Aboye in 1886. By 1958, the settlement was one of 27 places in Ethiopia ranked as a First Class Township. Fitawrari Gebre Kristos, started coffee plantations in the 1950s on land he inherited from his grandfather Fitawrari Wossen. Fitawrari Besha could employ up to 400 workers during high harvest season. After the Ethiopian revolution, Gebre Kristos abandoned his plantation and retired to Addis Ababa; his plantation was nationalized by the Land Nationalization Proclamation of March 1975.

In terms of school and education the town have some elementary, senior, secondary and preparatory schools. Agaro secondary and preparatory school is one of the oldest secondary and preparatory school in the town.

== Demographics ==
The 2007 national census reported a total population for this woreda of 25,458, of whom 12,946 were men and 12,512 were women. The majority of the inhabitants were Muslim, with 60.7% of the population reporting they observed this belief, while 33.76% of the population said they practised Ethiopian Orthodox Christianity, and 5.04% were Protestant.

The 1994 census reported this town had a total population of 23,246 of whom 11,687 were men and 11,559 were women.
