= Bosha =

Bosha may refer to:

- The Kingdom of Garo
- Bosha (Roma), an ethnic group in historic Armenia.
