= List of rulers of the Gibe state of Goma =

The following is a list of rulers of the Kingdom of Gomma. Gomma was one of the monarchies in the Gibe region of Ethiopia that emerged in the 18th century.

== List of rulers of the Gibe kingdom of Gomma ==
Tenure	Incumbent	Notes
Moti (rulers)
'Awulyani dynasty
(semi-legendary)	Nur Husein	Also called Wariko
????	Allaia, Moti
????	Woda, Moti
????	Mijyu, Moti
????	Abba Manno, Moti	Nephew of Nur Husein
early 19th century	Abba Bagibo, Moti
died 1856	Abba Rebo, Moti
mid 19th century	Abba Dula, Moti
died 1864	Abba Dula, Moti
late 19th century	Abba Jifar, Moti
until 1886	Abba Bok'a, Moti	Goma annexed by Ethiopia 1886

== See also ==
- Monarchies of Ethiopia
- Rulers and heads of state of Ethiopia
