= Abba Bok'a =

King of Kingdom of Jimma from 1859 to 1862

- Moti

King of the Kingdom of Jimma
- Reign: 1859–1862
- Predecessor: Abba Rebu
- Successor: Abba Gomol
- Dynasty: Kingdom of Jimma
- Religion: Islam

Moti Abba Bok'a was King of the Gibe Kingdom of Jimma (reigned 1859–1862). He was the son of Abba Magal, and brother of Abba Jifar I.

== Reign ==
Because the son of his nephew, Moti Abba Rebu, was an infant when he was killed, Abba Bok'a was made King. A devout believer unlike his predecessors, he advocated Islam in Jimma, building many mosques and sending educated Muslims to proselytize and teach in his provinces.

Abba Bok'a was very old at the time he became King, and died from natural causes.

Preceded by Abba Rebu	Kingdom of Jimma	Succeeded by Abba Gomol
