= Jiren, Ethiopia =

Former capital of the Kingdom of Jimma, in the Oromia Region of Ethiopia

Jiren
- Village
- Location within Ethiopia
- Coordinates: 7.70117°N 36.87219°E
- Country: Ethiopia
- Region: Oromia
- Zone: Jimma Zone
- Founded in: 1830
- Founder: Abba Jifar I

Jiren was the former capital of the Kingdom of Jimma, in the Oromia Region of Ethiopia. Today it is a village or suburb on the outskirts of the city of Jimma, consisting of approximately 2500 unregistered households.

== History ==
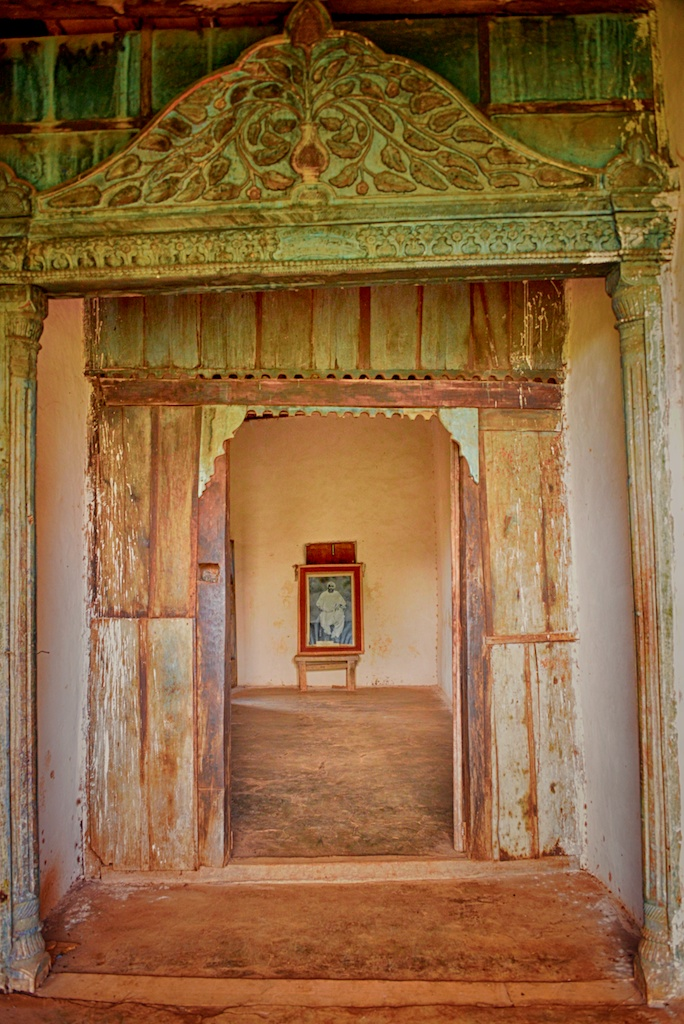
Abba Jifar II's palace in Jiren

Jiren was founded in the reign of Abba Jifar I (1830–1855), the first king of the Kingdom of Jimma.

Following the death of Abba Jifar II in 1932, the Kingdom of Jimma was annexed by the Ethiopian Empire and Jiren declined as a political centre. Writing in 1965, Herbert S. Lewis observed that the palace complex had disappeared and it had "shrunken to a settlement of a few hundred people who run some shops, bars and brothels". Most of its residents moved to Hirmata, which in 1936 was amalgamated with Jiren by the Italian colonial administration to form the new city of Jimma, the capital of Galla-Sidamo Governorate.
