= List of rulers of the Gibe state of Guma =

The following is a list of rulers of the Kingdom of Gumma. Gumma was one of the kingdoms in the Gibe region of Ethiopia that emerged in the 18th century.

== List of rulers of the Gibe Kingdom of Gumma ==
Tenure	Incumbent	Notes
Moti (Rulers) (horse names in parentheses)
late 18th century	Adam	Founder of Guma
c. 1795	Jilcha, Moti
c.1810	Oncho, Moti
c.1840 - 1854	Jawe, Moti
1854 - June 1879	..., Moti (Abba Dula)
June 1879 - c.1890	..., Moti (Abba Jubir)
c.1890 - 1899	..., Moti (Abba Fogi)	Conquered by Ras Tessema Nadew for Menelik II
1899 - 1902	Firisa, Moti	In revolt against Menelik II

== See also ==
- Monarchies of Ethiopia
- Rulers and heads of state of Ethiopia
