= Abba Magal =

Abba Magal (c. 1800) was a leader of the Diggo Oromo, and the father of Abba Jifar I.

Previously, the Diggo, based in the area of Mana, had conquered the nearby town of Hirmata that was home to the Lalo people. This victory gave Abba Magal enough wealth to compete with the dominant Oromo clan in Jimma, the Badi of Saqqa. With the help of his four sons, he began a series of wars that led to the formation of the Gibe Kingdom of Jimma.
