= Avva =

Russian masculine given name

Avva (Russian: А́вва) is an old and uncommon Russian male first name. Included into various, often handwritten, church calendars throughout the 17th–19th centuries, it was omitted from the official Synodal Menologium at the end of the 19th century. It may have derived from the Biblical Hebrew word abba, meaning father.

== See also ==
- Abba (given name)
