= Jeren =

Jeren is a given name and a surname. Notable people with the name include:

- Branko Jeren (born 1951), Croatian engineer and politician
- Jeren Kendall (born 1996), American baseball player
- Jeren Kurbanklycheva (born 1955), Turkmen composer

== See also ==
- Jaren (given name)
