= Malko =

King of Garo, Horn of Africa, 16th century

Malko (fl. 1540-1560) is the earliest king of Garo who is more than just a name in the traditions of the Oromo people. According to Werner Lange, "only the confused circumstances of his death were recalled: he is reputed to have been killed by "Gragn""—apparently the Imam Ahmad ibn Ibrahim.

He was succeeded by Gabito.
