= Abba Jofir =

Last king of Jimma

Abba Jobir
- Moti
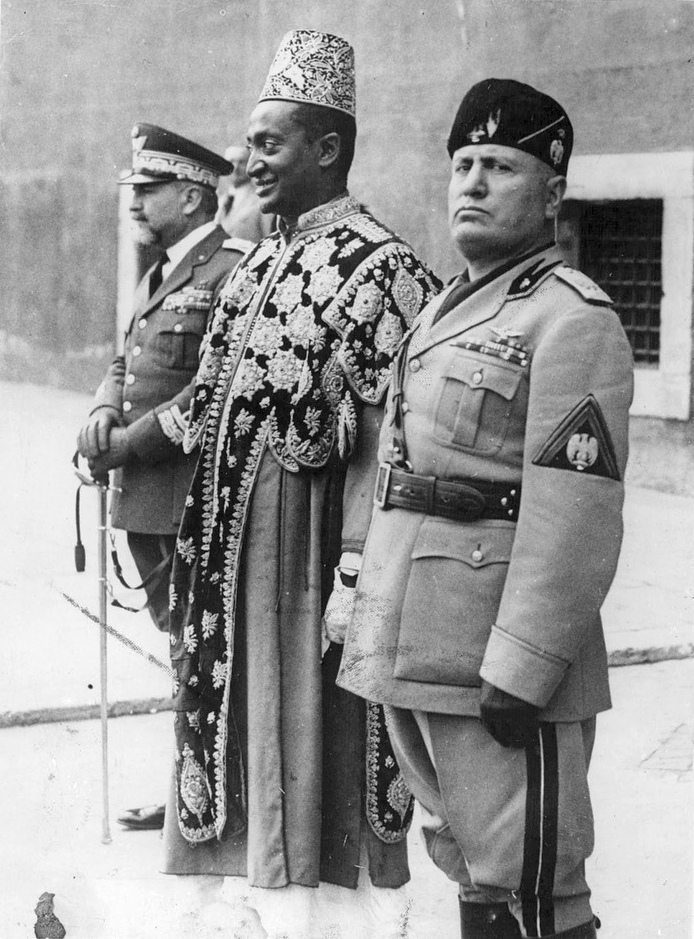
- Abba Jobir standing next to Benito Mussolini.

King of the Kingdom of Jimma
- Reign: 1932
- Predecessor: Abba Jifar II
- Born: 1900
- Died: 1988 (aged 87–88)
- Dynasty: Kingdom of Jimma

Moti Abba Jobir Abba Dula (1900–1988) was the last King of the Gibe Oromo Kingdom of Jimma who reigned in 1932. He was the grandson of Abba Jifar II. He aligned himself with the Italian occupation of Ethiopia.

== Reign ==
When King Abba Jifar II grew senile in his later years, Abba Jobir ascended the throne of the Kingdom of Jimma. His reign was, however, short lived because, in 1932, his letters of correspondence with the Italians was discovered. The Italians were recruiting people to rebel within Ethiopia in hopes of fomenting division before the impending invasion. After the discovery of his letters, he was summoned to Addis Ababa, charged with treason and imprisoned. In 1937, the Italians entered the city of Addis Ababa and occupied it. During this time, they freed their ally and installed him as Sultan of the Italian Province of Galla-Sidamo. He collaborated extensively with them and hunted resistance fighters with the aid of the Italians.

During the Italian occupation, Abba Jobir released broadcasts to the Arabic-speaking world, and traveled with a bodyguard of ten armed men, mainly due to the increased threat of assassination against him by Ethiopian Patriots of Kaffa/Jimma Province. Following the Italian defeat in 1942, Abba Jobir was imprisoned again, and later pardoned by Haile Selassie I.

== Notes ==
Preceded by Abba Jifar II	Kingdom of Jimma	Succeeded by none
