= Abba Judan =

2nd-century Jewish philanthropist

Abba Judan (or Judah) was a philanthropist who lived in Antioch in the early part of the second century. As an example of his generosity, it is recorded that once he sold half of his property, already considerably reduced by the demands of charity, to avoid turning away empty-handed Rabbis Eliezer, Joshua, and Akiba, who were collecting donations for educational purposes. The record adds that the blessings conferred upon him by these rabbis bore fruit, for shortly afterward, by a happy accident, he discovered a treasure. His name was not permitted to fall into oblivion, and for centuries later the name "Abba Judan" seems to have been applied in Palestine to every unusually benevolent man. It is thus the Jewish parallel to the name Mæcenas which is still applied, two thousand years after the life of its original bearer, to every great patron of art.
