= Abba Habib =

Nigerian politician

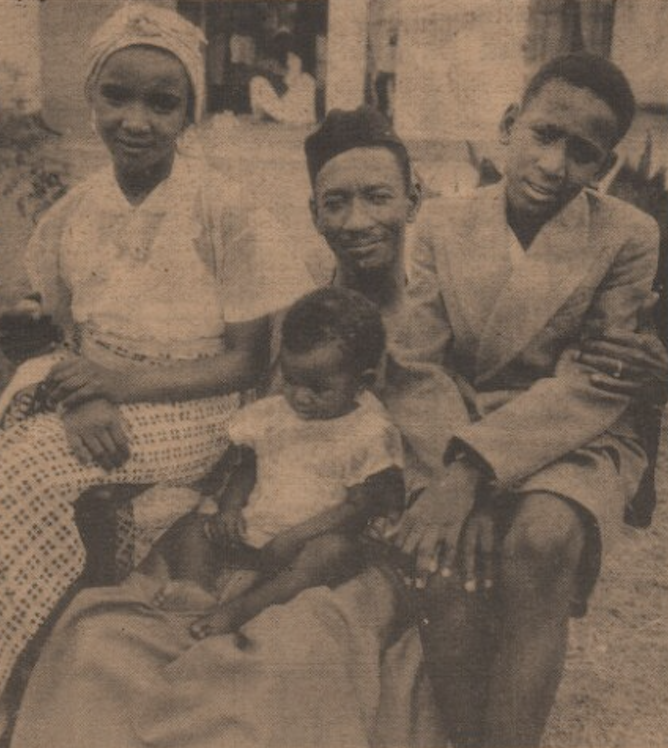
Abba Habib with his three children, 12-year old Mustapha on the right, Fati who was 9 years old and Kaka who was a year old.

Abba Muhammed Habib was a Nigerian politician who was a founding member and general secretary of the Northern People's Congress and later a regional minister for trade in the First Republic. He was a major political figure who represented the province of Northern Cameroons in the Northern Regional Assembly and later led the province to merge with the Northern Region of Nigeria in 1961.

Habib was a Shuwa Arab born in 1914 in Dikwa. He was among the first generation of students educated at Borno Middle School and Katsina College (now Hassan Usman Katsina Polytechnic) from 1928 to 1933. He subsequently taught at Maiduguri Middle School, Kaduna College, and Zaria Middle School; in 1948 he left teaching, becoming a Chief Scribe of the Dikwa Native Authority and later district head of Bama. In 1950 he became Development Secretary of the Dikwa Division.

Habib was elected into the Northern House of Assembly in 1951 or 1952 representing the Dikwa North constituency. From 1954 to 1959, he was the Minister for Trade and Industry of the region. After resigning in 1959, he took up the position of Waziri of Dikwa or Bama; he retired from this position in 1971.
