= Abba Gomol =

King of Kingdom of Jimma from 1862 to 1878

- Moti

King of the Kingdom of Jimma
- Reign: 1862–1878
- Predecessor: Abba Bok'a
- Successor: Abba Jifar II
- Dynasty: Kingdom of Jimma

Moti Abba Gomol was King of the Gibe Kingdom of Jimma (reigned 1862–1878).

== Reign ==
Abba Gomol was the son of Abba Bok'a and a woman from the Busase family of the Kingdom of Kaffa.

His major achievement was conquering the Kingdom of Garo, which became the southeast portion of the Kingdom of Jimma.

== Notes ==
Preceded by Abba Bok'a	Kingdom of Jimma	Succeeded by Abba Jifar II
