= Kingdom of Gomma =

Kingdom in Gibe region of Ethiopian Empire between 18th and 19th century

- c. 1780 – 1886
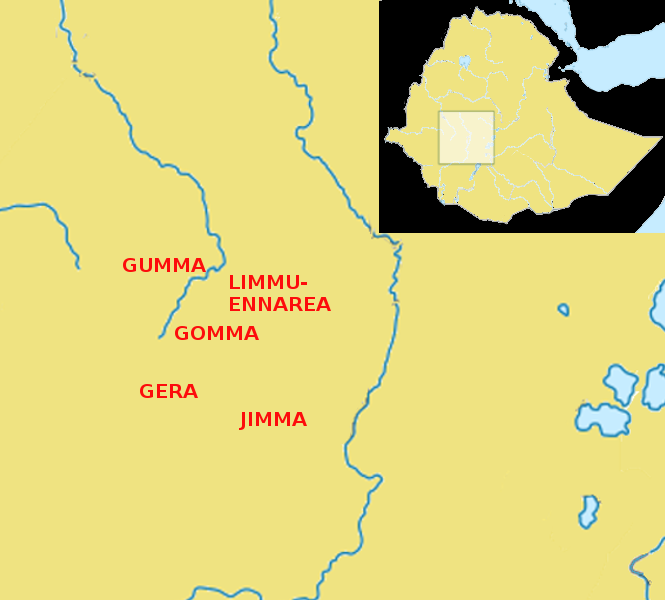
- The five Oromo kingdoms of the Gibe region
- Capital: Agaro
- Religion: Sunni Islam
- Government: Monarchy
- History
  - Established: 18th century
  - Annexed by Ethiopian Empire: 1886
Succeeded by
Ethiopian Empire
- Today part of: Ethiopia

The Kingdom of Gomma was a kingdom in the Gibe region of Ethiopia that emerged in the 18th century. It was based in Agaro.

== Location ==
Gomma shared its northern border with Limmu-Ennarea, its western border with Gumma, its southern border with Gera, and its eastern border with Jimma. Its capital was Agaro.

This former kingdom was mostly located in an undulating valley, with a population estimated in 1880 of about 15,000-16,000; its extent is roughly the same as the modern woreda of Gomma. Beckingham and Huntingford considered Gomma, along with Gumma, was the least economically developed of the Gibe kingdoms; however Mohammed Hassen writes that "the people of Gomma devoted themselves to farming, earning a reputation for a high degree of civilization.

Also located in the kingdom of Gomma were two hills, Sinka and Bemba (the last was also called Kella Egdu Biya, or "Gate of the Watching of the Land"), which were sacred to the Oromo. They were inhabited by prophets who lived with large snakes; descendants of these snakes are offered beer and goats' blood by Oromos to alleviate their illnesses.

== History ==
Mohammed Hassen notes that "the written information on the early history of Gomma is limited, and confused." Beckingham and Huntingford trace the foundation of Gomma to a miracle-worker who was named Nur Husain or Wariko, said to have come from Mogadishu. Although they speculate that this semi-legendary figure might have been confused with the better-known Sheikh Husein, whose tomb is located near the Shebelle River, they note that Antonio Cecchi reports that Wariko's tomb is located on the banks of the Didessa River, and was an object of veneration.

Hassen explains the tradition around Nur Husain as reflecting the fact that "Gomma was the first state in the Gibe region where Islam became the religion of the whole people." Trimingham states that Gomma was the first of the Gibe kingdoms to convert to Islam, quoting Major G.W. Harris as writing that by 1841 "in Goma the Moslem faith is universal."

Hassen states that the first King of Gomma was Abba Boke, although Beckingham and Huntingford state his son, Abba Manno, had this honor. Abba Boke had gained control over all of Gomma, between Yacci and Dogaye, except for a region named Qattu. Abba Manno was later able to annex Qattu during his reign (c. 1820 - 1840), and promoted Islam by patronizing Muslim religious teachers, as well as enhancing the activities of the Qadiriya order.

In 1886, Gomma was conquered by Beshua Abue on behalf of Emperor Menelik II.

== See also ==
- Ethiopian Empire
- List of Sunni Muslim dynasties
- Rulers of the Giba State of Goma
