= Abba bar Abina =

3rd-century Talmud rabbi

Rabbi Abba bar Abina (Jewish Palestinian Aramaic: ר' בא בר בינה) was an amora (Talmud rabbi) who lived in the third century.

He was a native of Babylonia and a pupil of Abba Arikha. He emigrated to the Land of Israel, where he became well known in tradition, particularly through his various haggadic sayings.

The confession which he composed for Yom Kippur reads:

רבוני חטאתי ומירע עשיתי ובדעת רעה הייתי עומד ובדרך רחוקה הייתי מהלך וכשם שעשיתי איני עושה יה"ר מלפניך ה' אלהי שתכפר לי על כל פשעי ותמחול לי על כל עונותי ותסלח לי על כל חטאתי

My God, I have sinned and done wicked things. I have persisted in my bad disposition and followed its direction. What I have done I will do no more. Be it Thy will, O Everlasting God, that Thou mayest blot out my iniquities, forgive all my transgressions, and pardon all my sins.

— Jerusalem Talmud, Yoma, page 42b
