= Kingdom of Gera =

Kingdom in Gibe region of Ethiopian Empire in 19th century

- 1835–1887
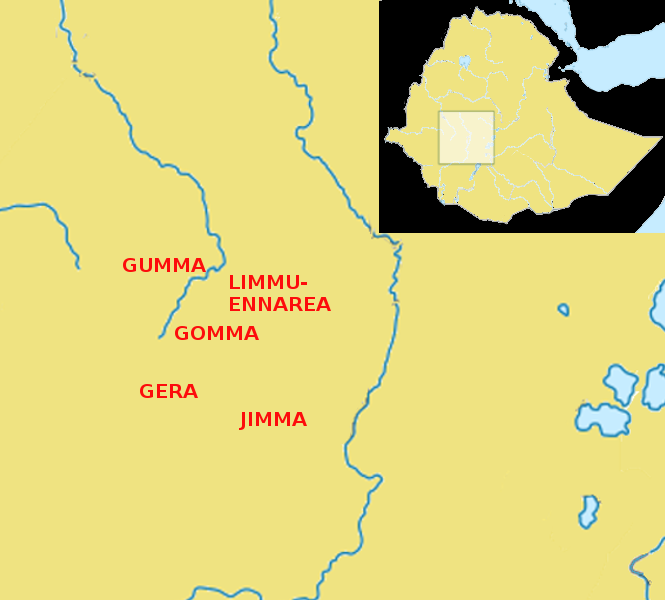
- The five Oromo kingdoms of the Gibe region
- Capital: Chala (Chira)
- Religion: Sunni Islam
- Demonym: Oromo
- Government: Monarchy
- Donacho
- History
  - Established: 1835
  - Annexed by Ethiopian Empire: 1887
Succeeded by
Ethiopian Empire
- Today part of: Ethiopia

The Kingdom of Gera was a kingdom in the Gibe region of Ethiopia that emerged in the late 19th century. It shared its northern border with the Kingdom of Gumma, its eastern border with the Kingdom of Gomma, and was separated from the Kingdom of Kaffa to the south by the Gojeb River. With its capital at Chala (Later Chira), the Gera kingdom's territory corresponds approximately with the modern woreda of Gera.

== Overview ==
The Kingdom of Gera was located in a basin surrounded with gently undulating hills, although extensive swampland existed in the northern hills. The population of this kingdom was estimated in 1880 to have been between 15,000 and 16,000. The planting and harvesting of corn followed a different calendar in Gera from the other Gibe kingdoms; where the others planted in February and harvested in July, in Gera it was planted in April and harvested in August. Mohammed Hassen adds that Gera "was, and still is, the rich land of honey" and notes that Gera honey had a reputation as the finest honey in Ethiopia. Hassen lists eight kinds of honey cultivated in Gera, the best being the Ebichaa ("dark") honey, from which was made a mead known as dadhi, the drink of royalty and dignitaries in the Gibe region. "It is not surprising, therefore," Hassen concludes, "that the flavorsome and prestigious Ebichaa was a royal monopoly."

Gera is also the location of Mount Ijersa, which the Oromo regard as sacred. They believe that God will take his seat there at the time of the Last Judgement.

Rulers of the kingdom held the royal title of Donacho.

== History ==
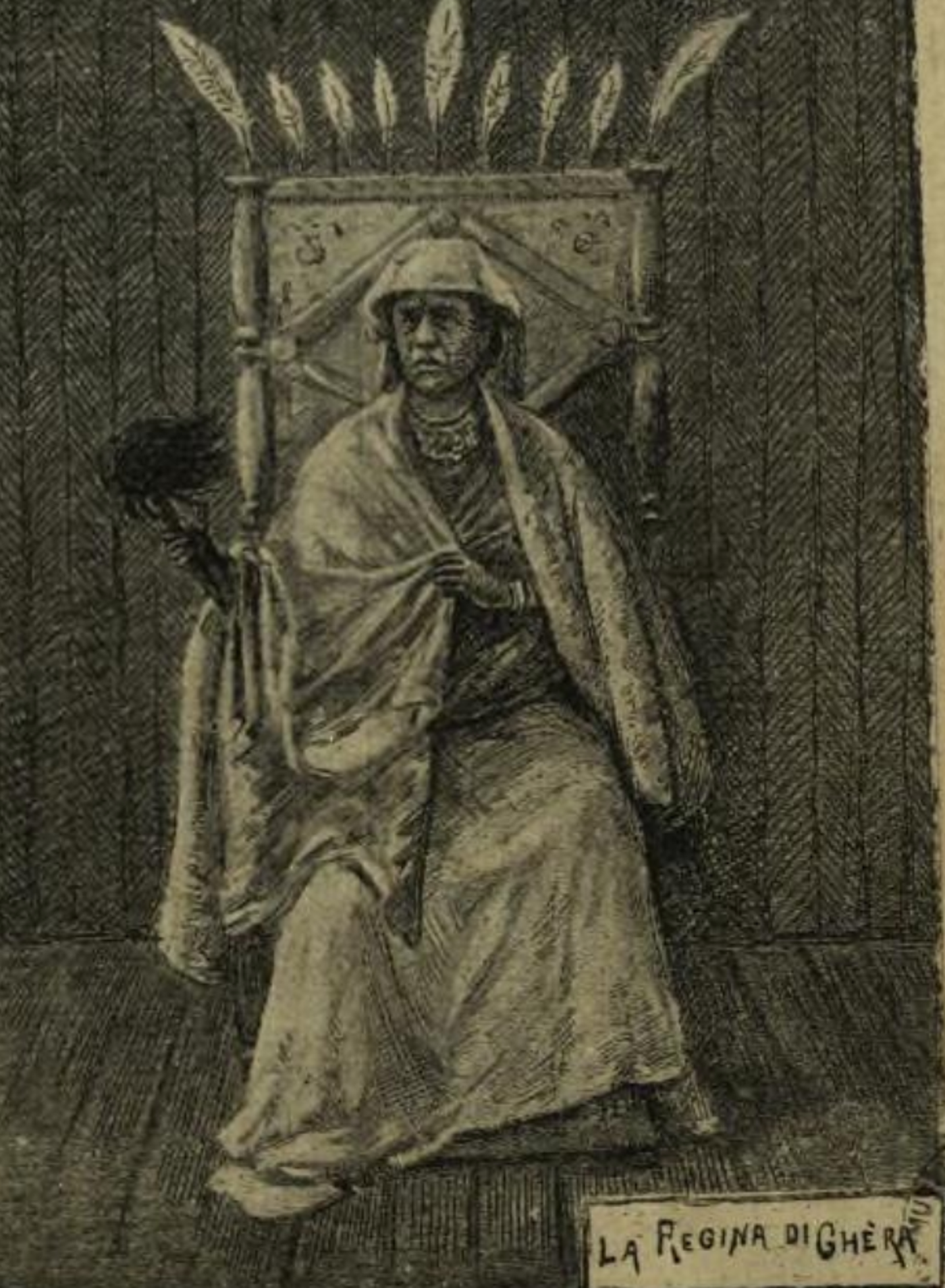
Genne-fa, Queen of Gera

According to Beckingham and Huntingford, there is evidence that the monarchy of Gera existed before the Great Oromo migration in the 16th century. However, according to Mohammed Hassen, Gera was the last of the Gibe kingdoms to come into existence, and was founded by Gunji, "a successful war leader who made himself king" around 1835, but died shortly afterwards. This dynasty came to an end with the murder of Tulu Ganje by king Oncho of Gumma. A new one was founded by Abba Baso, who proved to be an unpopular ruler. He was later overthrown by his brother Abba Rago and exiled to Jimma.

According to Trimingham, the kingdom enjoyed its greatest prosperity under king Abba Magal, who had been converted to Islam, although a number of his subjects still professed Christianity. It unclear which Gibe king was responsible for this conversion: Trimingham attributes this achievement to Abba Jubir of Gumma; Mohammed Hassen gives the initial credit to Abba Bagibo of Limmu-Ennarea, who offered to support Abba Magal in his fight for the throne if he allowed Muslim missionaries into his kingdom, and only later did Abba Jubir convert him. On King Abba Magal's death, his wife Genne Fa acted as regent for their son, both of whom became prisoners in Jimma when Gera was conquered by Dejazmach Besha Abua in 1887.

== See also ==
- Ethiopian Empire
- Rulers of the Gibe State of Gera
