= Jeren Kurbanklycheva =

Turkmen composer (born 1955)

Jeren Gurbangylyjova
- Jeren Gurbangylyjowa
- Born: 3 June 1955 (age 70); Ashkhabad, Turkmen SSR, USSR (now Ashgabat, Turkmenistan)
- Occupation: Composer

Jeren Gurbangylyjova (Turkmen: Jeren Gurbangylyjowa; Russian: Джерен Курбанклычева, romanized: Dzheren Kurbanklycheva; also written as Jeren Kurbanklycheva; born 3 June 1955) is a Turkmen composer who holds the official title of The First Woman Composer of Turkmenistan.

== Early life and education ==
Jeren was born in Ashkhabad, Turkmen SSR, USSR to a family of the actors Sofya Gurbangylyjova and Muhammetnur Gurbangylyjov. Her debut with her first composition was when she was eight years old; she wrote a song to her father’s new stage play and performed it as a surprise to her dad, in their house in front of their family friends and Muhammetnur’s colleagues. Jeren Kurbanklycheva started her musical studies as a pianist. In her early age, she went to the Special Boarding Music School at Turkmen National Conservatory. Upon graduation she was accepted to Specialized Music School named after Danatar Ovezov where she spent 4 years and received an Undergraduate degree in Piano Performance. After that Kurbanklycheva was accepted to Turkmen National Conservatory to the Composition Department and studied composition under the People's Artist of Turkmenistan, professor Chary Nurymov. Upon graduation she started working at the conservatory as theory and composition teacher and then later in her career she became the Chair of Composition Department at the same conservatory. In 1976 Jeren's piano sonata won in the Conservatory Competition Among Young Composers. In 1989 her composition took honorable mention place in international festival project InterOrchestra 89 founded by a former rector of Kurmangazy State Conservatory of Almaty, Dusen Kaseinov who is now the General Secretary of TÜRKSOY. Within this project Kurbanklycheva's "Poem for Strings, Percussion and Celesta" was performed by the USSR Bolshoi Theatre Orchestra under Fuat Mansurov and was added to All-Union and Turkmen Radio Funds. Vinyl recording of Kurbanklycheva's Cello Concerto was recorded by Melodia with USSR State Radio and Television Symphony Orchestra under Vladimir Kozhukhar. Since 1978 Jeren Kurbanklycheva is a member of the Composer's Union of Turkmenistan. Collections of works and songs for children is another chapter of her repertoire. Besides composing for kids, Kurbanklycheva devotes a big amount of her time in masterclasses, coachings, seminars and presentations at public schools, community schools and orphanages. For her work with children and adolescents she became a Laureate of the Prize of Lenin Komsomol of Turkmenistan (1987). In 1993 Jeren Kurbanklycheva was awarded a title of Merited Artist of Turkmenistan.

== Musical language ==
Kurbanklycheva composes in various genres including chamber music, with works such as "String Quartet" (1977), "Sonata for Flute and Piano" (1986); instrumental music, pieces for violin (1974) and woodwinds (1980); vocal music, symphonic music, songs for children etc. Among her notable symphonic works are "Symphonic Dances" (1974), "Symphonic Poem for Strings, Percussion and Celesta" (1978), "Concerto for Violoncello and Orchestra" (1979), "Concerto for Piano and Orchestra in Memory of Ayal Bakshy" (1991), "Dabaraly Mugam" ("Grand Overture) for orchestra of Folk Instruments (2002), "Concerto for Dutar and Orachestra of Folk Instruments (2004)". Vocal cycles "Songs of Motherhood" (1984), "Songs of My Dutar" (1987), "Ornaments of Independence" (1993) are some of her major vocal works. Like in other music of Turkmen composers, in music of Jeren Kurbanklycheva we can clearly hear patriotic and ethnic notes but unlike other composers, Jeren chooses to deliver her nationalistic ideas and patriotic spirit through the language of contemporary music. Her style, musical language and thoughts about contemporary music and compositional techniques can be understood when she discusses her vision of modern music: “Young generations always strive for something new. Of course a contemporary composer should possess a whole arsenal of tools and a vision for new music and modern writing, but should it completely destroy the common sense of music and melody? That’s not what I believe in. However, neither should a stereotype of staying musical and sounding good dissolve ones initial idea and hold one from delivering a message across. First, an idea, then you develop the melody that conveys the meaning behind it in its absolute accuracy up to the point when your melody becomes a better expression of your idea than your words or even thoughts. Then, more you engrave your melody, the brighter it starts to reflect different colors of other factors like nowadays social life, your emotional and mental state, your ethnical heritage, nationality and culture and of course other types of modern arts. The moment those vivid reflections of one single idea become organic enough to shine as a ray but still keep their unique colors to be heard individually, you get the composition that came directly from an open heart. Pure and honest. People appreciate honesty, so no matter how boldly atonal or “old fashioned” tonal a piece ended up being, the audience will pick up your open message and will connect to it.”

== Teaching philosophy ==
Jeren Kurbanklycheva teaches composition at Turkmen National Conservatory. As a composition teacher she mentions her philosophy: “My goal as a pedagogue is to be able to cultivate already existing talent. Students who come to study composition are very different. Some young composers think widely, some are very gentle and flexible- those can be guided to chamber music. There are students who feel voice very well, most likely they will be able to express the best of themselves in vocal music genre. The most important thing while directing students in one way or another is to keep their individual language and not to break their unique musical personalities.”

== Audience connection ==
Jeren Kurbanklycheva has said on multiple occasions that her main award will always be an appreciation from her audiences and one of her main goals is to make the process of hearing her piece rewarding for her listeners, which beneficially effects her process and helps her to broaden the boundaries of her professional art, inspiring her to write more and to be more: “It’s not easy to gain trust, attention, and engagement from listeners- especially if it’s a premiere. If my piece is played in a huge hall with just one person in the audience and if just this one person will connect to my piece, it means that through my composition I found a way to evoke something in this person so the piece that is personal for me, so it becomes personal for him it will be my victory and I will consider it a successful premiere.”

== Personal life ==
Since 1978 Jeren Kurbanklycheva is married to Oleg Annaovezov, a former chief of Turkmenistan's ministry of foreign economic relations, and is a mother of three children: Bahar Annaovezova (by marriage: Bahar Ilarslan), 1979; Bayram Annaovezov, 1983; Maral Annaovezova, 1991. She currently resides in Ashgabat, Turkmenistan and continues making her contribution into musical and cultural life of her country as a composer, teacher and performer.

== List of works ==
=== Piano ===
- Collection of Piano Pieces for Children- 1974
- Two Preludes for Piano- 1975
- Sonatina for Piano- 1976
- Piano Variations- 1976
- Piano Concerto in Memory of Ayal Bakshy- 1991

=== Instrumental ===
- Piece for Violin- 1974
- Violoncello Concerto- 1979
- Two Pieces for Clarinet- 1980

=== Vocal ===
==== Song cycles ====
- Vocal Cycle "The Songs of Motherhood" Words: B. Orazdurdyeva- 1984
- Vocal Cycle "The Songs of My Dutar" Words: N. Bayramov- 1987
- Vocal Cycle "Ornaments of Independence" Words: K. Meredov- 1993

==== Songs and romances ====
- "Memories of You" Words: O. Annayeva- 1980
- "Rainy Day" Words: N. Annatyeva- 1981
- "How are You?" Words: N. Annatyeva- 1981
- Skvoz Razluku
- "I am in Joy" Words: B. Orazdurdyeva- 1982
- "Confession" Words: A. Atajanov- 1982
- "The Song of Youth" Words: K. Kurbannebesov- 1983
- "Youth" Words: A. Agabayev- 1983
- "Cranes" Words: A. Atajanov- 1984
- "The March of Peace" Words: Tenti Adysheva- 1985
- "White Snow" Words: O. Annayeva- 1986
- "Come, Let's Pick Tulips?" Words: A. Atajanov- 1990
- "Young Generation" Words: K. Meredov- 1991
- "Independence Day" Words: K. Meredov- 1992
- "Light Up Turkmenistan" Words: A. Yusupova- 2008
- "The Song of Joy" Words: H. Kakaliyev- 2011

=== Chamber ===
- Two Duets for Violin and Cello- 1975
- String Quartet- 1977
- Sonata for Flute and Piano- 1986

=== Symphonic orchestra ===
- Two Symphonic Dances- 1974
- Poem for String, Percussion and Celesta- 1978
- Concerto for Violoncello and Orchestra- 1979
- Piano Concerto in Memory of Ayal Bakshy- 1991

=== Works for orchestra of folk instruments ===
- In collaboration with Merited Artist of Turkmenistan Oraz Annanepesov- "Dabaraly Mugam" ("Grand Overture") for orchestra of Folk Instruments- 2002
- In collaboration with People's Artist of Turkmenistan Yolaman Nurymov- Concerto for Dutar and Orachestra of Folk Instruments- 2004
