= Rabbi Abba =

3rd- and 4th-century Talmud rabbi

Rabbi Abba (Hebrew: רבי אבא) was an amora (Talmud rabbi) of Babylonian birth who lived in the third and fourth centuries.

He was a pupil of Rabbis Huna and Judah bar Ezekiel, the Babylonian masters, and settled in the Land of Israel, where he achieved a high reputation. In the Babylonian schools, Rabbi Abba is always meant when reference is made to "our teacher in the land of Israel" (Sanhedrin 17b). He was wealthy and had a peculiar method of dispensing charity in secret (Ketubot 67b). He is important as a halakhist. As an aggadist, he selected chiefly Psalm verses for his texts.
