= Abba Yudan =

3rd-century Jewish Palestinian scholar

- Era: 3rd century

Abdan or Abidan (contraction of Abba Yudan) was a Jewish Palestinian scholar of the first amoraic generation, who lived about the beginning of the third century.

As a disciple and clerk of Judah ha-Nasi (known as "Rabbi"), he seems at times to have been too officious in his bearing toward the members of the rabbinical college. Thus, when R. Ishmael ben Jose seemed to be forcing his way into the college in a manner contrary to the college rules, Abdan exclaimed, "Who is he that strides over the heads of the holy people?" When Ishmael ben Jose replied, "It is I, Ishmael ben Jose, who am come to learn the Law from Rabbi," Abdan retorted, "Art thou worthy to learn from Rabbi?" Piqued by this insolence, Ishmael asked, "Was Moses worthy to learn from the Almighty?" Thereupon Abdan inquired, "And art thou Moses?" To which Ishmael made the reply, "And is thy master the Almighty?"

On that same occasion, however, after Rabbi had entered the college hall, an opportunity presented itself for Ishmael to prove himself an expert in halakhic knowledge, while Abdan, who, coming back from an errand, attempted to force his way through the assembled crowd, was ordered by Rabbi to remain at the door. Legend adds that Abdan was severely punished for his arrogance. He himself was visited with an attack of eczema, and two of his sons were drowned. His memory, however, was revered as that of a good man, for Rav Nachman bar Yitzchak, in referring to this legend, thanked God for abasing Abdan in this world and not reserving his punishment for the world to come.
