= Herbert S. Lewis =

American anthropologist

Herbert S. Lewis (born May 8, 1934) is a Professor Emeritus of Anthropology at the University of Wisconsin-Madison, where he taught from 1963 to 1998. He has conducted extensive field research in Ethiopia and Israel and worked with Oneida Indian Nation of Wisconsin. Aside from publications based on ethnographic field research he has written theoretical works about political leadership and systems, ethnicity, cultural evolution. Since the late 1990s he has published extensively about the history of anthropology, much of it offering new insights into the work and thought of Franz Boas.

== Biography ==
=== Early life ===
Although born across the Hudson River in New Jersey he grew up in several communities around New York City, spending his high school years in Lynbrook on Long Island. He also had the chance to work in Manhattan for several summers and to attend graduate school at Columbia University.

=== Education ===
- 1955 A.B., anthropology (cum laude) Brandeis University
- 1963 Ph.D., anthropology Columbia University

=== Professional life ===
- 1956-57 Departmental Fellow and Assistant, Department of Sociology and Anthropology, The City College, New York
- 1957-58 Instructor, Department of Public Instruction, American Museum of Natural History
- 1961 Lecturer in Anthropology, Columbia University, School of General Studies
- 1961-63 Instructor, Departments of Anthropology and Political Science, Northwestern University
- 1963-67 Assistant Professor of Anthropology, University of Wisconsin.
- 1967-73 Associate Professor of Anthropology, University of Wisconsin.
- 1973-96 Professor of Anthropology, University of Wisconsin. (Emeritus, May 1996.)
- 1969-70 Visiting associate professor, The Hebrew University, Jerusalem.
- 1978-81 Chair, Department of Anthropology, University of Wisconsin.
- 1989-90 Resident Director, University of Wisconsin, Junior Year Abroad Program at University of Warwick, UK
- 1993-95 Chair and Director, African Studies Program, University of Wisconsin
- Present: Professor Emeritus in the Department of Anthropology at the University of Wisconsin- Madison.

== Research career ==
In Ethiopia, Lewis studied both the history of the Oromo (Galla) Kingdom of Jimma Abba Jifar and the lives of contemporary Oromos from 1958 to 1960 and in 1965–66. (Many of his ethnographic photographs are visible in the University of Wisconsin's Digital Library). His work in Ethiopia was concerned above all with political leadership and community organization as well as ethnohistory and culture history. The book, originally titled A Galla Monarchy: Jimma Abba Jifar, Ethiopia, 1830-1932, is a study of the nature of the monarchy, the sources of the ruler's power, as well as its origins. The study in 1965-66 centered on community life and the leadership of spirit mediums, k'allu, who effectively organized religious life and conflict resolution, and provided a degree of political leadership for rural districts.

In the 1970s and 1980s, Lewis studied ethnicity, class, and culture change in Israel, focusing on those Jews who immigrated from Yemen and Morocco. The major publication resulting from this work was After the Eagles Landed: The Yemenites of Israel. Contrary to the stereotype of the Yemenites as downtrodden and rather poor "Oriental" Jews (mizrachim in current usage) Lewis's evidence showed them to be confident, increasingly successful in status (occupation, education, political presence), as well as maintaining and developing aspects of their music, dance, arts, and persistent in the orthodox Jewish religious belief and practices they brought with them from Yemen.

His 2005 publication, Oneida Lives (see below), presents a large selection of personal accounts by Oneidas of Wisconsin that offer wide-ranging perspectives on the lives of men and women of various ages between 1885 and the beginning of World War II. (These accounts were collected by the Oneidas themselves through a WPA grant to the University of Wisconsin anthropology department. Morris Swadesh initiated the WPA project in 1937 and it was initially overseen by Floyd Lounsbury.)

His book In Defense of Anthropology: An Investigation of the Critique of Anthropology presents a series of chapters that make a sustained argument for the value and honor of modern American and British anthropology. The work traces the major transformation undergone by American anthropology as a result of the cataclysmic events of the 1960s—the war in Vietnam, the civil rights movement, the increasing rise of the women's and other identity movements, and the increasingly visible anti-colonial movements. The discipline of anthropology became the object of numerous critiques; "the critique of anthropology's complicity in projects of power is itself the main political act" (Sherry Ortner 1999). This work responds critically to these critiques, offering evidence to counter the widespread notion of anthropology as the handmaiden of colonialism, and of its liability for exoticizing and otherwise misrepresenting what post-1960s writers call "the Other."

Lewis' major research interests include: anthropological theory and history, cultural and social change, ethnicity, and political anthropology. Although initiated into anthropology by Marxian, materialist, neo-evolutionists at Brandeis and Columbia he soon became more of a Weberian-Boasian. His conversion was mediated and facilitated by fieldwork in political anthropology in Africa, a concern for ethnicity before this was a common and acceptable subject, the teaching of Conrad Arensberg, the early writings of Fredrik Barth, Max Weber on forms of political action. These led to a concern with individual action in the context of culture.

== Significant works ==
=== Books ===
- A Galla Monarchy:¬ Jimma Abba Jifar, Ethiopia, 1830–1932.¬ University of Wisconsin Press, 1965. (Reissued by Red Sea Press as Jimma Abba Jifar: An Oromo Monarchy. 2001)
- After the Eagles Landed: The Yemenites of Israel. Westview, 1989. (Reissued by Waveland Press, 1994.)
- Oneida Lives: Long-lost Voices of the Wisconsin Oneidas. (Edited with an Introduction) University of Nebraska Press, 2005.
- In Defense of Anthropology: An Investigation of the Critique of Anthropology. Transaction Publishers, 2014.

=== Articles ===
- "The Origins of the Galla and Somali," Journal of African History, 7:27-46, 1966.
- "Leaders and Followers: Some Anthropological Perspectives," Addison Wesley Module in Anthropology, 1974.
- "Neighbors, Friends and Kinsmen: Principles of Social Organization Among the Cushitic-Speaking Peoples of Ethiopia," Ethnology, 13(2):145-157, 1974.
- "Warfare and the Origin of the State: Another Formulation," In Henri Claessen (ed.) The Study of the State, Mouton, (201–221) The Hague, 1981.
- "Ethnicity in Ethiopia: The View from Below (and from the South, East and West)." In M. Crawford Young (ed.) The Rising Tide of Cultural Pluralism: The Nation State at Bay?, (158–178) Madison, Wisconsin: University of Wisconsin Press, 1993.
- "The Misrepresentation of Anthropology and its Consequences." American Anthropologist 100 (3):716-731, Sept. 1998.
- "The Passion of Franz Boas." American Anthropologist, 103 (2):447-467, June 2001. (Reprinted as "Afterword" to a new edition of Franz Boas, Anthropology and Modern Life, 2004, Transaction Publishing.)
- "Boas, Darwin, Science, and Anthropology." Current Anthropology, 42(3): 381–406, June 2001.
- "The Globalization of Spirit Possession," In: Social Critique and Commitment: Essays in Honor of Henry Rosenfeld, eds. Majid Al-Haj, Michael Saltman and Zvi Sobel. University Press of America, 2005, pp. 169–191.
- "The Influence of Edward Said and 'Orientalism' on Anthropology, or: Can the Anthropologist Speak?." In Israel Affairs,13 (4): 774–785, 2007. (Also in C. P. Salzman, ed. Postcolonial Theory and the Arab-Israeli Conflict. 2008.)
- "The Radical Transformation of Anthropology: History Seen through the Annual
- Meetings of the American Anthropological Association, 1955–2005." In Regna Darnell & Frederic Gleach (eds.) Histories of Anthropology Annual #5. 2009.

"Adapt Fully to Their Customs": Franz Boas as an Ethnographer among the Inuit of Baffinland (1883–84) and His Monograph The Central Eskimo (1888). In F. Delgado Rosa & H. Vermeulen (eds.) Ethnographers Before Malinowski: Pioneers of Anthropological Fieldwork, 1870–1922. Berghahn Press. 2022. pp. 47–82. “African Political Systems and Political Anthropology.” A. Boskovic & G. Schlee (eds.) African Political Systems Revisited. Berghahn Press. 2022.

== Awards and honors ==
- 1955 Research Institute for the Study of Man, Training and Research Fellowship, for fieldwork in St. John, U.S. Virgin Islands (summer).
- 1956 Research Institute for the Study of Man, Training and Research Fellowship, for fieldwork in Martinique, F.W.I. (summer).
- 1956-57 The City College, New York, Department of Sociology and Anthropology, Fellowship.
- 1958-60 Ford Foundation, Foreign Area Fellowship for dissertation research in Ethiopia (24 months).
- 1963 Social Science Research Council Travel Grant, to attend Second International Conference of Ethiopian Studies.
- 1965-66 National Science Foundation Research Grant for field research in Ethiopia, (15 months).
- 1965-66 Social Science Research Council Research Grant for field research in Ethiopia, (declined in favor of the NSF grant).
- 1969-70 National Institute of Mental Health, Small Grant for research in Israel, (11 months). 1971-72 University of Wisconsin Graduate School for research on ethnicity in Wisconsin, (with A.¬ Strickon).
- 1975-77 National Science Foundation Research Grant for field research in Israel, (24 months).
- 1975-77 National Institute of Mental Health Research Grant (24 months, declined in favor of the NSF grant).
- 1987 Fulbright-CIES Research Award for field research in Israel, (Summer, 3 months, USIA).
- 1987 Fulbright-CIES Research Award for field research in Israel. (Summer, 3 months, Department of Education-declined).
- 1993 Received the Oromo Studies Association Award
- 1994 Institute for the Study of Economic Culture (Boston University, Peter Berger) Fellow, June–July faculty seminar, "Democracy, Development, and Civil Society."
- 1996 Mellon Resident Research Fellowship at the American Philosophical Society Library (one month) 2001 Brittingham Foundation grant for preparation of "Oneida Lives."
- University of Wisconsin Graduate School Research Grants, 1964, 1967, 1970, 1971, 1973, 1978, 1981, 1987, 1989, 1991, 1994.
- 2008-2010 President-elect of the Association of Senior Anthropologists
- 2010–2012 President of the Association of Senior Anthropologists
