= Kingdom of Garo =

1527–1883 Oromo kingdom

Coordinates: 7°30′N 37°10′E

- 1527–1883
- Common languages: Bosha
- Religion: Christianity
- Government: Monarchy
- King
  - 1863–1883: Dagoye
- History
  - Established: 1527
  - Annexed by Kingdom of Jimma: 1883
Preceded by	Succeeded by
Ennarea	Kingdom of Jimma
- Today part of: Ethiopia

The Kingdom of Garo, also known as Bosha after its ruling dynasty, was a kingdom in the Horn of Africa. It was situated on the periphery of the Gibe region of Ethiopia.

== Location ==
The kingdom of Garo had definite borders to the north with Kingdom of Yamma, on the east was the Omo River, and on the south the Gojeb River separated Garo from the Kingdom of Kaffa. Lacking a clear boundary on its western borders, the kingdom's subjects had constructed a series of trenches and gates to defend themselves from encroachments by the Oromos of the Kingdom of Jimma.

== History ==
Werner Lange discusses the possibility that the kingdom of Garo had been a subsidiary part of Ennarea, in much the same way that Ennarea had been a part of the kingdom of Damot. By the reign of Yeshaq I, Garo had separated itself from Ennarea, and was a tributary state to Ethiopia; it may be the "Bosge" mentioned in the itineraries of Zorzi. In the 16th century, the Emperor Sarsa Dengel convinced Garo's King to officially embrace Christianity. Although under the increasing pressure of the other Oromo reconquest into the Gibe region forced "the Bosa kingdom must have continued its gradual contraction until little more than a relatively small area isolated in the highland forests of May Gudo was left at the end of the century."

Garo survived as an independent state until the reign of Abba Gomol of Jimma, who conquered the last isolated part of this realm. At the time Emperor Haile Selassie annexed Jimma, a descendant of Dagoye, the last King of Garo, was living in a state of "semi-banishment" in Jiren.

Dukamo

- Rulers of Bosha
