= Abba Jifar I =

First king of Kingdom of Jimma (d. 1855)

- Moti

King of the Kingdom of Jimma
- Reign: 1830–1855
- Predecessor: Inaugural
- Successor: Abba Rebu
- Died: Kingdom of Jimma
- Religion: Islam

Moti Abba Jifar I (r. 1830–1855) was the first king of the Gibe Kingdom of Jimma.

== Reign ==
Abba Jifar was the son of Abba Magal, who was a leader of the Diggo Oromo. He built upon the political and military base his father had provided him, and created the Kingdom of Jimma. Consequently, Jimma was no longer referred to as Jimma Kaka in common parlance, but as Jimma Abba Jifar.

Herbert S. Lewis credits Abba Jifar with having initiated "many administrative and political innovations", despite the lack of specific historical evidence. According to oral tradition, Abba Jifar claimed the right to the extensive areas of the newly conquered land as well as virgin or unused land, which he both kept for himself and used to reward his family, followers and favorites. He reportedly constructed at least five palaces in different parts of Jimma.

The historian Mordechai Abir notes that between the years 1839 and 1841 of his reign, Abba Jifar fought with Abba Bagibo the King of Limmu-Ennarea over the district of Badi-Folla. The area was important for control of the caravan route between the Kingdom of Kaffa on the one hand, and the provinces of Gojjam and Shewa on the other. While the two Kings negotiated a peace in 1841, and sealed the treaty with the marriage of Abba Jifar's daughter to Abba Bagibo's son Abba Dula, the Jimma King eventually conquered Badi-Folla (1847) and secured control over this important caravan route.

Abba Jifar was also the first king of Jimma to embrace Islam, owing his conversion in 1830 to Abdul Hakim, an Amhara trader from Gondar. Lewis notes that as of 1960, Abdul Hakim's tomb in Jiren was still a venerated site.

Preceded by none	Kingdom of Jimma	Succeeded by Abba Rebu
