= Abba Jifar II =

King of Jimma from 1878 to 1932

- Motii Abba Jifar II
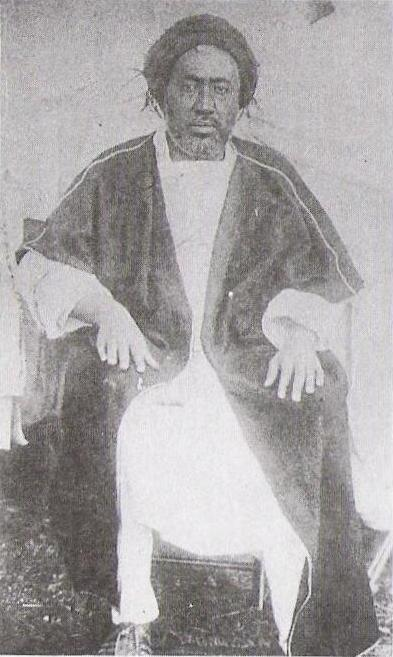

King of the Kingdom of Jimma
- Reign: 1878–1932
- Predecessor: Abba Gomol
- Successor: Abba Jobir
- Born: 1861
- Died: 1932 (aged 70–71)
- Dynasty: Kingdom of Jimma
- Father: Abba Gomol
- Mother: Gumiti
- Religion: Islam

Moti Abba Jifar II (Oromo: Mootii Abbaa Jifaar; 1861 – 1932) was King of the Gibe Kingdom of Jimma (r. 1878–1932).

== Reign ==
Abba Jifar II was king of Jimma, and the son of Abba Gomol and Queen Gumiti. He had several wives: Queen Limmiti, who was the daughter of the King of Limmu-Ennarea; Queen Minjo, the daughter of the King of Kaffa; and Queen Sapertiti, also from Limmu-Ennarea.

During Abba Jifar II reign there were Sufi saints who supported his rule. One of them is Sadati Of Bure (who is a sayyid from sadeqa village and Head of Alsadat family), who later migrated to Illubabor.

In the 1880s, Abba Jifar II conquered a portion of the Kingdom of Janjero, which lay east of Jimma, along the Omo River, and incorporated it into his kingdom.

Due to the advice of his mother Queen Gumiti, to avoid the detriments of war, he agreed to submit to Menelik II, negus of Shewa in 1884. In 1886, Abba Jifar II paid peace offerings consisting of "slaves (including eunuchs), ivory, bamboo internodes filled with civet, jars of honey, locally made cloth, spears, shields ornamented with silver plates, and objects of wood (including stools)." Because of these "shrewd politics", which included providing military assistance to Menelik in conquering the neighboring kingdoms of Kullo (1889), Walamo (1894), and Kaffa (1897), he was able to preserve the autonomy of Jimma until his death. On the other hand, Alexander Bulatovich states that, when Jimma was annexed to Ethiopia, Emperor Menelik imprisoned Aba Jifar "for inspiring excessive enthusiasm in his own standing army and trying to entice Abyssinian soldiers to his own service" in Ankober for a year. "When he was freed," Bulatovich continues, "Aba Jefar again received the throne of Jimma from Menelik." Historian Enrico Cerulli however states that Abba Jifar was detained for 26 weeks due to his refusal to hand over Hadiya rebel leader Hassan Enjamo.

Queen Gumiti also advised him to expand the cultivation of coffee in his kingdom, which provided increased revenue for him and his subjects.

In January 1898, as part of a Red Cross mission to southwestern Ethiopia, Bulatovich visited Jimma, and was the guest of Abba Jifar. While in Jeren, Bulatovich treated the Queen Mother for "a little bronchitis". He left the following description of the king:

Aba Jefar is still a young man -- handsome, well-built, and somewhat in his prime. He has a typical face: a straight thin nose; bright, handsome eyes which shift suspiciously from side to side; a thick black beard; and black, short-cropped, curly hair. His hands are graceful. He wears large gold rings on all his fingers. Dressed in a white shirt and trousers, he has draped over his shoulders the thinnest white shamma. His feet are also very small and handsome, clad in leather sandals.

Towards his later years, Abba Jifar II succumbed to senility. His grandson Abba Jobir attempted to take control and re-assert Jimma's independence. However, Emperor Haile Selassie responded quickly and sent military forces against Abba Jobir. The soldiers brought Abba Jobir back to Addis Ababa, where he was imprisoned.

In 1930, Haile Selassie removed an enfeebled Abba Jifar II from power and installed his son-in-law, Ras Desta Damtew, in his place. Desta Damtew ruled as Governor (Shum) of Jimma, while Abba Jifar II was allowed to remain as King (Negus) as titular head. When Abba Jifar II died in 1932, the Kingdom of Jimma was officially ruled directly by the Emperor.

== Notes ==
Preceded by Abba Gomol	Kingdom of Jimma	Succeeded by Abba Jofir
