= Kingdom of Jimma =

1790–1932 Oromo kingdom based in southwestern Ethiopia

Coordinates: 7.6666°N 36.8333°E

- 1737–1932
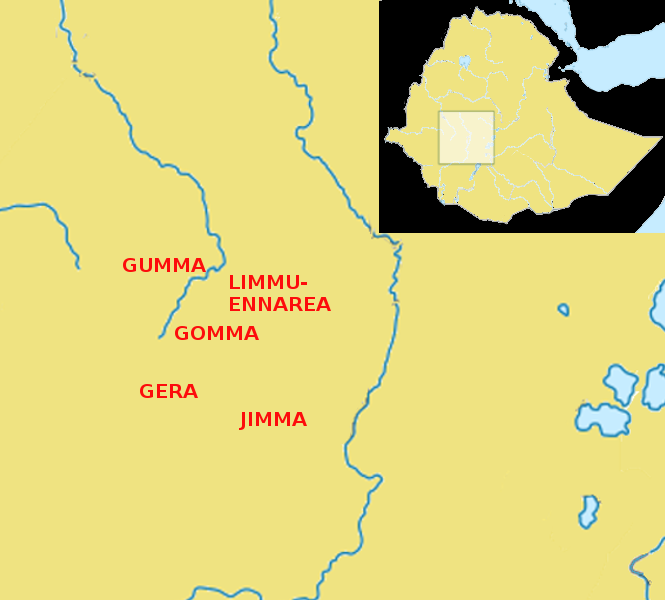
- The five Oromo kingdoms of the Gibe region
- Capital: Jiren (now called Jimma)
- Common languages: Oromo
- Religion: Sunni Islam
- Government: Monarchy
- King (Moti)
  - 1830–1855: Abba Jifar I
  - 1932: Abba Jofir
- History
  - Established: 1737
  - Renamed Jimma Abba Jifar: 1830
  - Vassal to Kingdom of Shewa: 1884
  - Vassal to Ethiopian Empire: 1889
  - Annexed by Ethiopian Empire: 1932
Succeeded by
Ethiopian Empire
- Today part of: Ethiopia

The Kingdom of Jimma (Oromo: Mootummaa Jimmaa) was an Oromo Muslim kingdom in the Gibe region of Ethiopia that emerged in the 18th century. It shared its western border with Limmu-Ennarea, its eastern border with the Sidamo Kingdom of Janjero, and was separated from the Kingdom of Kaffa to the south by the Gojeb River. Jimma was considered the most powerful militarily of the Gibe kingdoms.

== History ==
=== Establishment ===
According to legend, a number of Oromo groups (variously given from five to 10) were led to Jimma by a great sorceress and Queen named Makhore, who carried a boku (usually connected with the abba boku, or headman of the Oromo Gadaa system) which when placed on the ground would cause the earth to tremble and men to fear. It is said that with this boku, she drove the Kaffa people living in the area across the Gojeb River. While this suggests that the Oromo invaders drove the original inhabitants from the area, Herbert S. Lewis notes that Oromo society was inclusionist, and the only ethnic differences they made are reflected in the history of various kinship groups.

Eventually, the Oromo grew unhappy with Makhore's rule, and through a ruse, deprived her of her virginity, and destroyed her power. The various groups then pursued their own courses, loosely bound into a confederation that held councils at Hulle, where laws were passed under the abba boku; at this point, Jimma was commonly referred to as Jimma Kaka.

The specific ruling dynasty of Jimma emerged from the Diggo clan of the Mecha Oromo. During the great 16th-century Oromo migrations, the Mecha moved alongside their brother subgroup, the Tulama. Originally traveling from the south, they advanced north toward Shewa region. In the genealogical structure of the Oromo nation, they belong to the Borana moiety. From Shewa, the Mecha split away and moved further west and southwest, crossing the Gibe River to settle in fertile, high-altitude regions.

At first, the Badi of Saqqa were the predominant clan (which led to the alternate name of Jimma Badi), but late in the 18th century another group, the Diggo of Mana, began to extend their domain, conquering the Lalo clan who lived around Jiren, and gaining access to the market and trade center at Hirmata (later called Jimma). Mohammed Hassen believes that the Badi lost their predominant position in part due to raids by king Abba Bagibo of Limmu-Ennarea, but also due to constant infighting.

It was during the reign of Abba Jifar I that the kingdom of Jimma coalesced, and after this time Jimma was frequently referred to as Jimma Abba Jifar. King Abba Jifar was also converted to Islam in 1830 by Abdul Hakim, an Amhara trader from Gondar, and began the long process of also converting his entire kingdom to that religion. Herbert S. Lewis credits Abba Jifar with having initiated "many administrative and political innovations", despite the lack of specific historical evidence. According to oral tradition, Abba Jifar claimed the right to the extensive areas of the newly conquered land as well as virgin or unused land, which he both kept for himself and used to reward his family, followers and favorites. He reportedly constructed at least five palaces in different parts of Jimma. The historian Mordechai Abir notes that between the years 1839 and 1841 of his reign, Abba Jifar fought with Abba Bagibo, the King of Limmu-Ennarea, over the district of Badi-Folla. The area was important for control of the caravan route between the Kingdom of Kaffa on the one hand, and the provinces of Gojjam and Shewa on the other. While the two Kings negotiated a peace in 1841, and sealed the treaty with the marriage of Abba Jifar's daughter to Abba Bagibo's son Abba Dula, the Jimma King eventually conquered Badi-Folla (1847) and secured control over this important caravan route.

Under King Abba Gomol, the ancient Kingdom of Garo was conquered and annexed into Jimma. King Gomol settled wealthy men from his kingdom in the former state. He also brought important men from Garo to live at Jiren, thus integrating the two polities.

It was shortly after his son Abba Jifar II assumed the throne that the power of the neguses of Shewa began to reach into the Gibe region for the first time in centuries. As Lewis notes, "Borrelli, Franzoj and other travellers accorded him little hope of retaining his kingdom for long." However, heeding the wise advice of his mother Gumiti, he submitted to Menelik II, and agreed to pay tribute to the negus, and counseled his neighboring kings to do the same. Although Hadiya state initially surrendered to the Abyssinians, opposition grew quickly and a resistance movement formed under their new leader Hassan Enjamo, numerous nobles of the Jimma kingdom including the brother of king Abba Jifar joined the militia in Hadiya.

King Abba Jifar instead found himself enthusiastically helping the Shewan king conquer his neighbors: Kullo in 1889, Walamo in 1894, and Kaffa in 1897. In 1928, the tribute of Jimma amounted to MTT87,000 and an additional MTT15,000 for the army.

Following the death of Abba Jifar II, Emperor Haile Selassie seized the opportunity to finally annex Jimma. As Harold Marcus observes, the kingdom's "autonomy had been undermined by the declining world economy, the deteriorating health of its ruler, the road that slowly advanced from Addis Abeba, the advent of air power, and the transcendent needs of modern, centralized power." On 5 May 1932, the official newspaper Berhanena Selam editorialized that the kingdom was in danger because her king, Abba Jifar, was old and ill and his grandson and heir no longer properly obeyed the central government and was using the kingdom's revenues to build up an army. Seven days later, on 12 May, 400 soldiers and a team of administrators descended upon Jimma and brought the kingdom to an end. During the reorganization of the provinces in 1942, the last administrative traces of the kingdom vanished into Kaffa Province.

== Administration ==
The Kingdom of Jimma had its own administration, which was centered at the royal palace. An officer referred to as the azazi ("the orderer") served there as the head. His function at the court was essentially that of a majordomo, exclusively overseeing domestic palace affairs. The azazi maintained a number of treasuries, and dispensed funds to cover court-related expenses. The palace also housed professional soldiers, whom the azazi had the power to assign infrastructural maintenance chores to. Other officers oversaw other day-to-day activities at the palace, including artisanal labor and royal court guest hospitality.

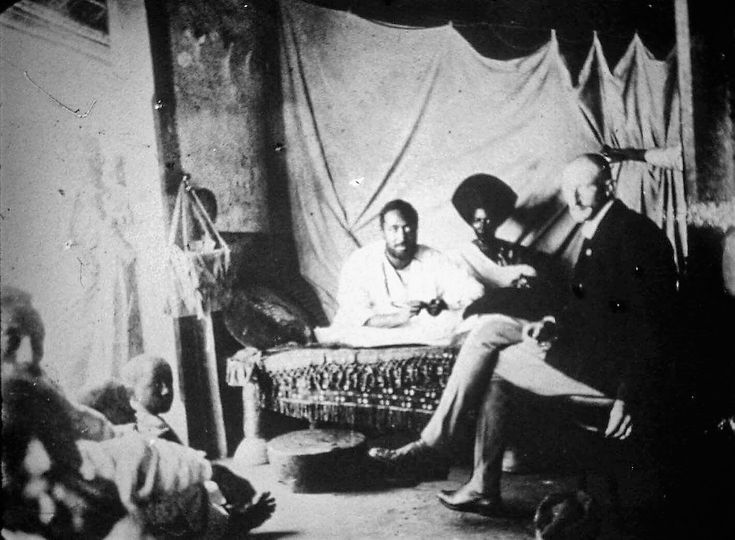
Abba Jifar II with his wife, 1905

Like the other Gibe kingdoms, Jimma's ruler King Abba Jifar also owned many slaves. They served as officials in the royal palace, where they attended to the needs of the King's wives and supervised the abattoir and meal preparation, among other activities. The slaves also acted as jailers, market judges, and stewards of the King's territories. Additionally, they sometimes served as governors of a province, though this position was usually given to wealthy nagadras (chief of trade and markets).

At noon, the King, his retinue, court officials and guests dined together at the mana sank'a ("house of the table"). It consisted of a great hall with several large round wooden tables. The King and 20 to 30 other individuals sat around the main table, with the remaining tables ranked in importance according to how close they were positioned to the King. During the evening, the King typically dined alone with one of his wives, and often summoned instrumentalists or Arab merchants with a gramophone for musical accompaniment.

== Economy ==
Slavery in the 19th-century Kingdom of Jimma was a foundational institution that drove the state's economy and international commerce. Centred around Hirmata, a massive regional market, the kingdom served as a prominent African hub for the export of captives toward the Red Sea coast. Domestically, enslaved labor obtained through regional military raids was heavily utilized by the kingdom and royal estates. Under Abba Jifar II, the palace administration fiercely protected the trade to maintain financial and political autonomy. Ultimately, however, it officially ended following the abolition of slavery in the 1930s under Emperor Haile Selassie.

In Jimma, Maria Theresa Thalers (MTT) and salt blocks called amoleh were used as currency until the reign of Emperor Menelik II.

Coffee (Coffea arabica) became a major cash crop in Jimma only in the reign of King Abba Jifar II. Another source of income was the extraction of oil from civets, which was used to make perfume.

== Cultural Clothing and Hairstyle ==
Early descriptions of Jimma Oromo men and women clothing and hairstyles were recorded by Antonio Cecchi during his travels in the Gibe region in 1879-1880, followed by Jules Borelli in the mid-1880s, and later by the Italian photographer Leopoldo Traversi in the 1880s. their writings and photographs provide some of the earliest published images of dresses, adornment, and grooming practices in the Kingdom of Jimma.

=== Clothing ===
Oromo identity is fundamentally pastoralist, rooted in livestock and the cowhide tradition. Softened and decorated cowhide skirts, aprons, and capes are worn among Jimma Oromo men and women.Three main categories of skins, each with a specific name and cultural weight are utilized.

- Cowhide (Gogaa Loonii)

Cowhide is the primary material for garments such as the wandabo, a wrap-around skirt for women and siraa, a layered leather wrap for men.

- Goat and Sheep Skin (Haduu/ Gogaa Reeyee)

Goat and sheep skins are used for lighter garments such as capes. These skins were often treated with butter. These are used for flexible garments. These were frequently treated with butter, which acted as both a preservative for the leather and a cosmetic for the skin.

- Wild Animal Skins (Gogaa Bineensaa)

Skins from animals such as the colobus monkey or leopard were reserved for individuals of high status. These skins were strictly reserved for the Luba (those in the ruling age-grade of the Gadaa system) or for renowned warriors.

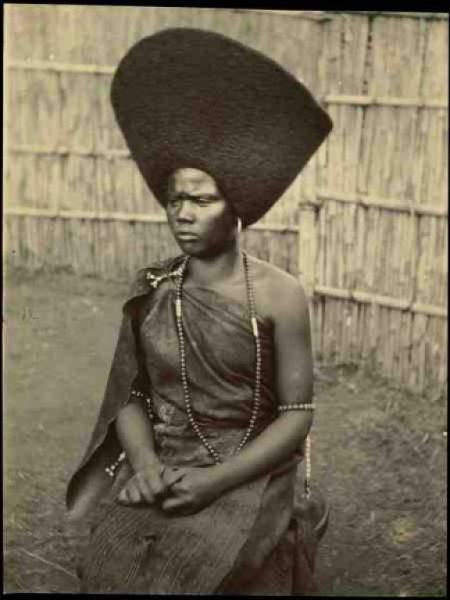
An Oromo woman from Jiren, Jimma wearing a wandabo and qollo

==== Specific Terminology ====
Wandabo: A wrap-around cowhide skirt for women.

Siraa: A layered leather wrap worn by men.

Qollo: A skin worn over shoulders by women.

Woya: A rob made from hide for men.

Gurda: A leather string or thin belt tied around the waist. It is the most decorated part of the outfit, used to hold tools and signify the woman's status. This is made from twisted hide or gut. It is a stiff leather belt heavily encrusted with white and colored glass beads. These beaded belts cinch leather skirts and produce a rhythmic clicking sound as the women walk, with specific bead patterns indicating clan affiliation and family wealth.

==== Preparation of Cowhide Garments ====
The preparation process, which includes scraping, sun-drying, softening with butter, repeated folding, and addition of decorative elements. Some hides are smoked to increase durability. Traversi remarked on the distinct scent of the leather, which was treated with specific local barks (like birbira) to prevent rot. This scent was a marker of an Oromo person. The beadwork integration is unique. It pierced the hide or is sewn onto the edges. This creates a garment that is noisy and rhythmic. The beads click against the stiff leather as the wearer moves. This process required skill and patience, and leatherworking was considered an important domestic craft.

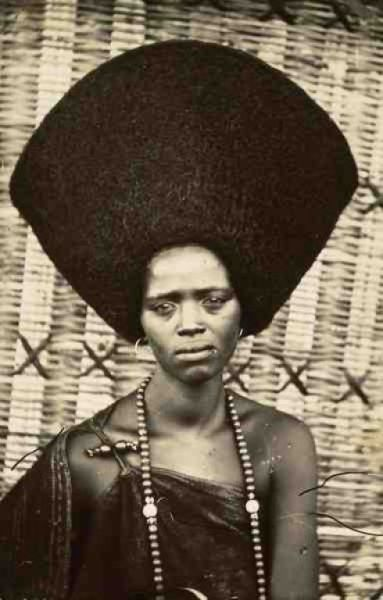
An Oromo woman from Jiren, Jimma

=== Hairstyles ===
Hairstyles formed a central component of Jimma Oromo women's cultural expression. In early photographs, Jimma Oromo women are depicted wearing strikingly large, rounded coiffures that are considered one of the most distinctive aesthetic features of the region. Plant fibers are used to support the structure, allowing the coiffure to rise into its characteristic large, rounded form without collapsing. These coiffures reflected age, marital status, and social identity.

=== Jewelry and Ornamentation ===
Glass beads, cowrie shells, metal hoop earrings, and bead bracelets are used as jewelry. Court women wear finely prepared cowhide garments and elaborate hairstyles reflecting the political and cultural prestige of the Jimma monarchy.

== Gallery ==
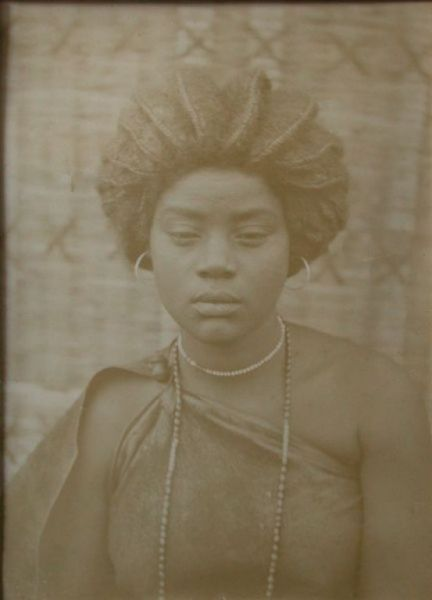

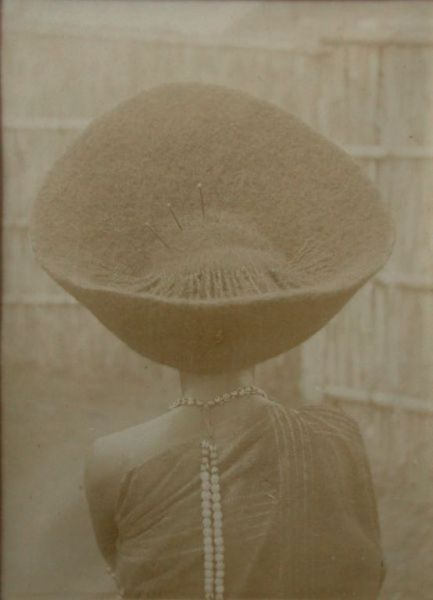

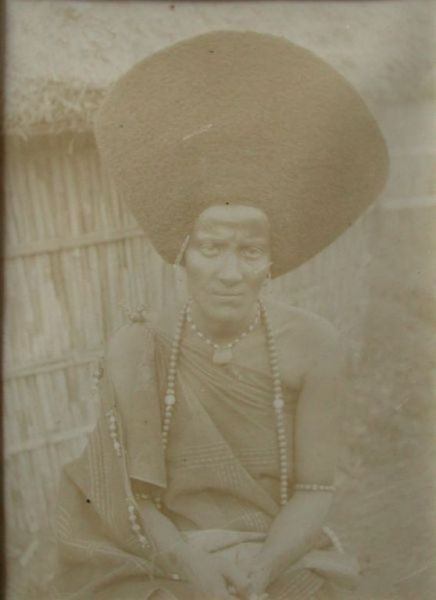

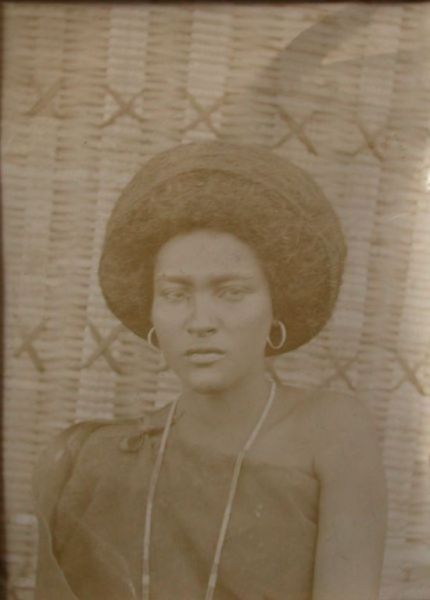

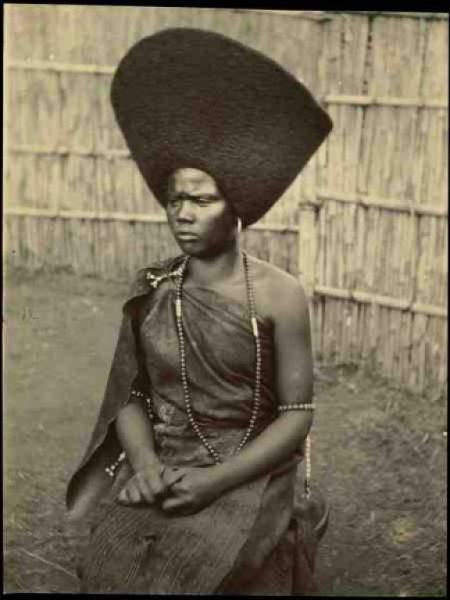

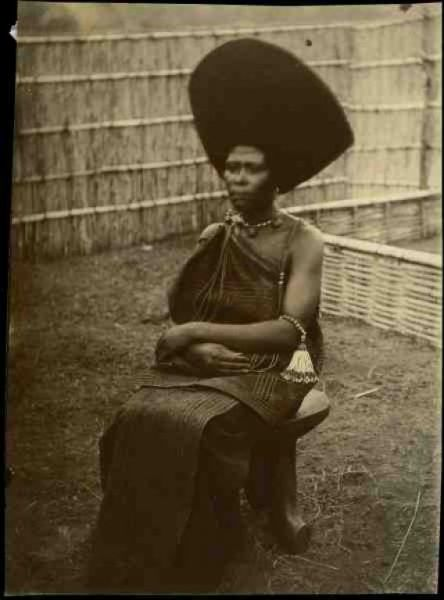

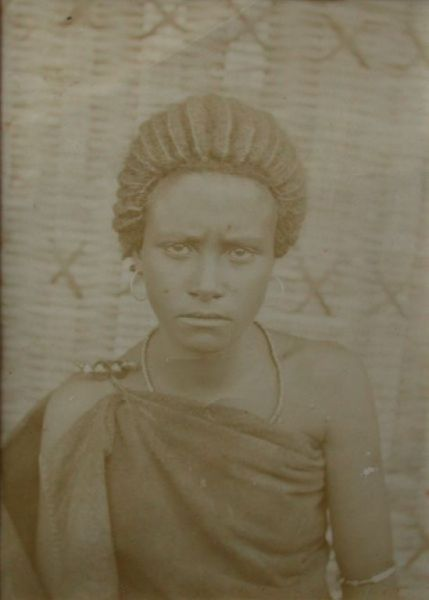

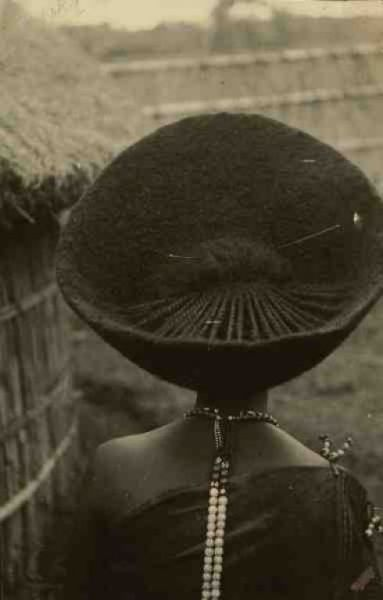

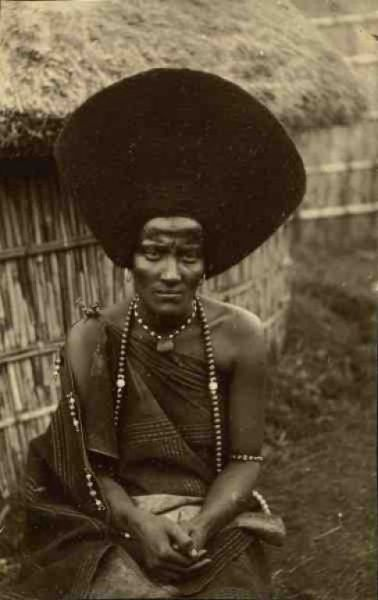

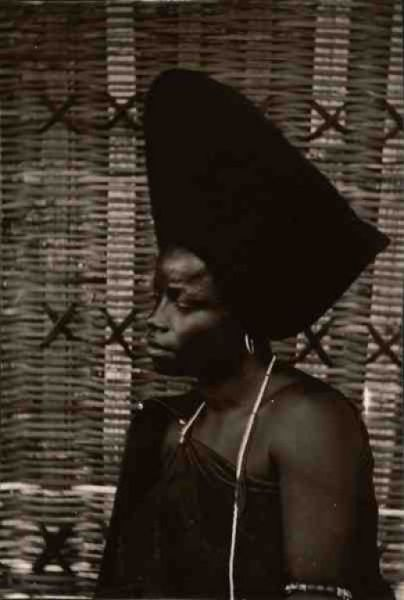

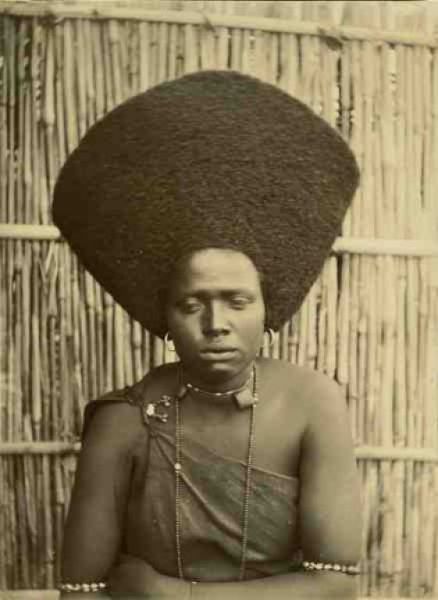

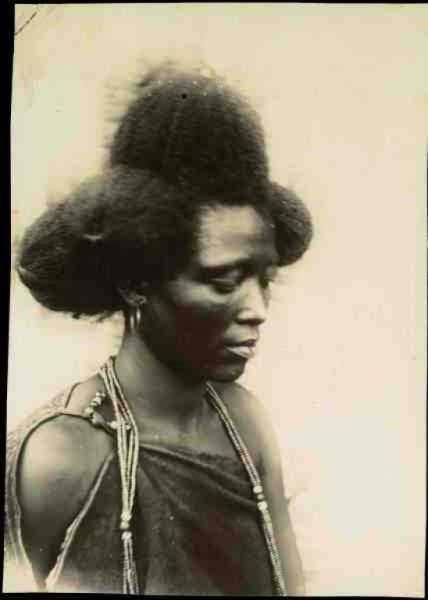

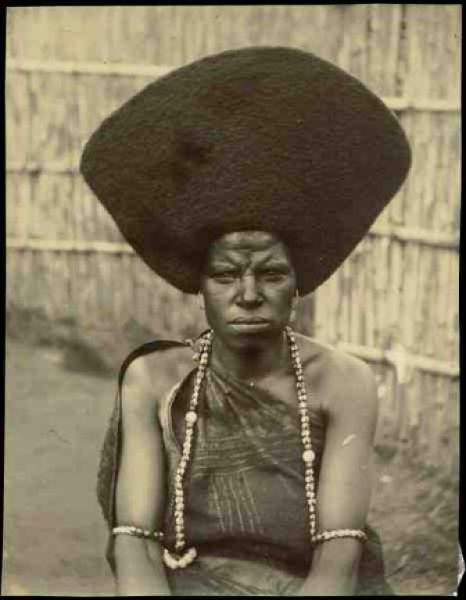

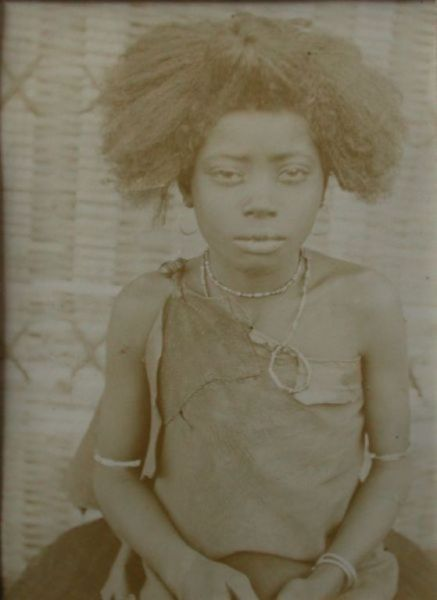

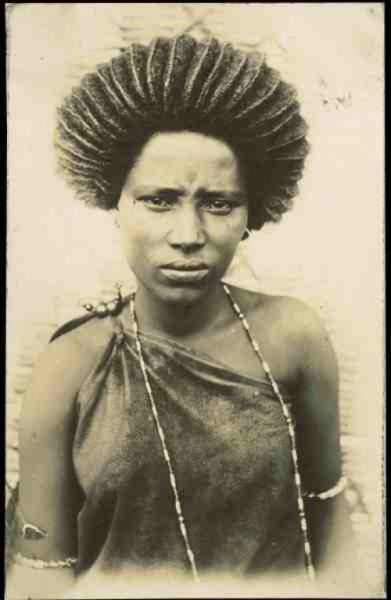

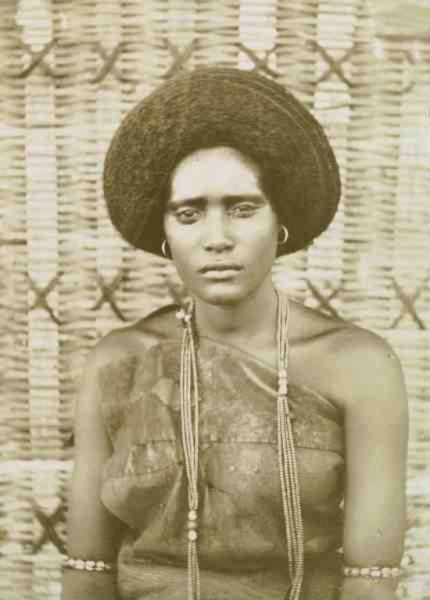

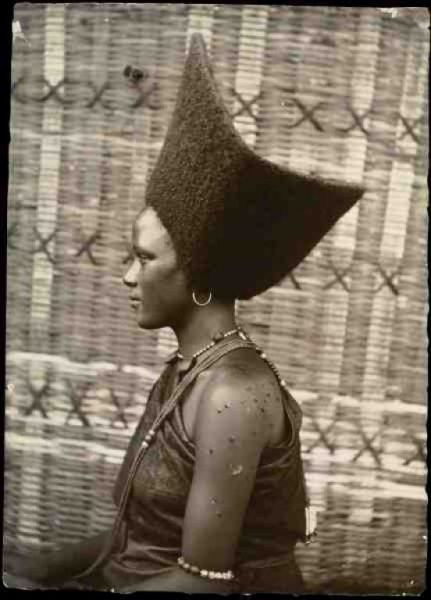

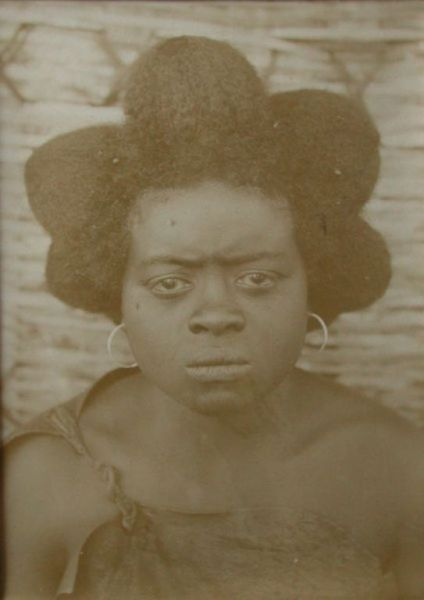

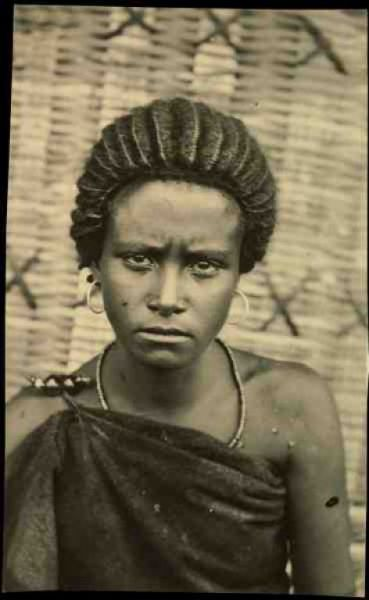

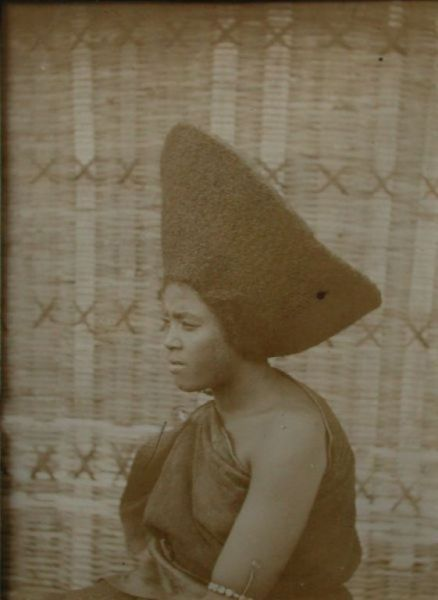

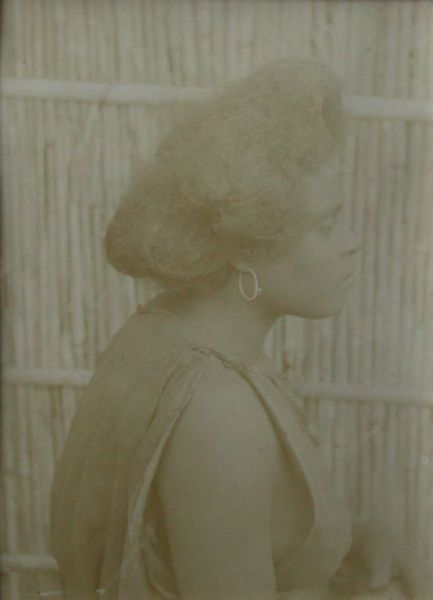

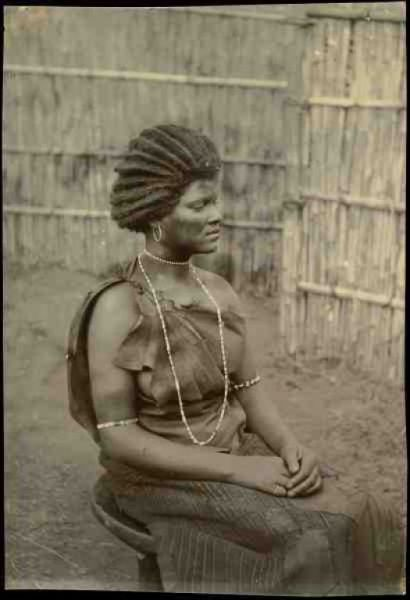

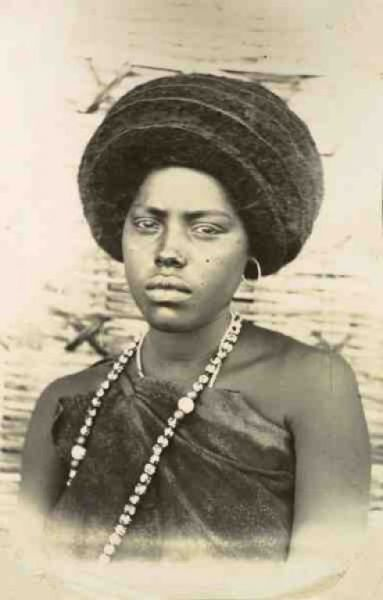

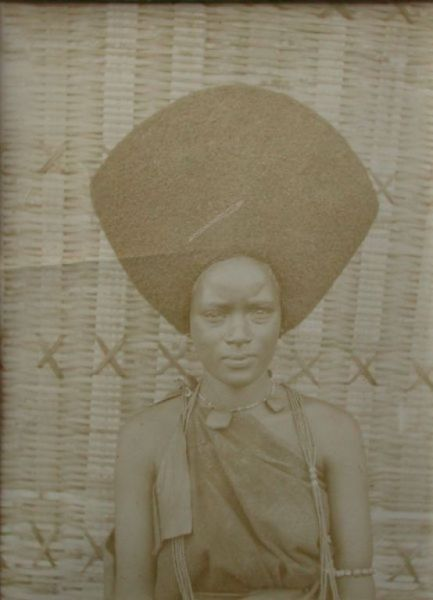

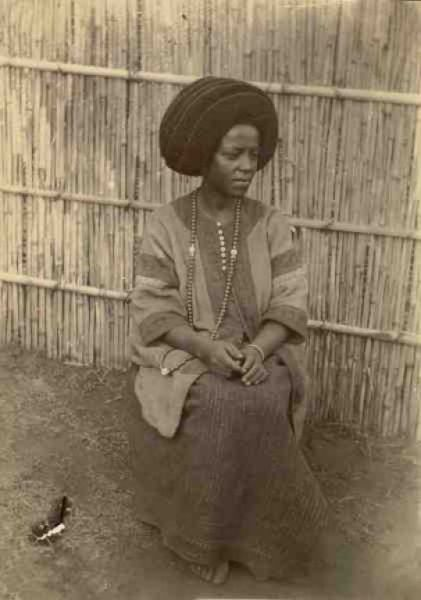

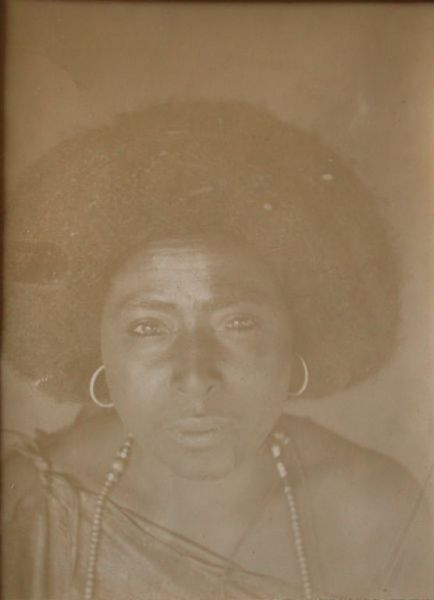

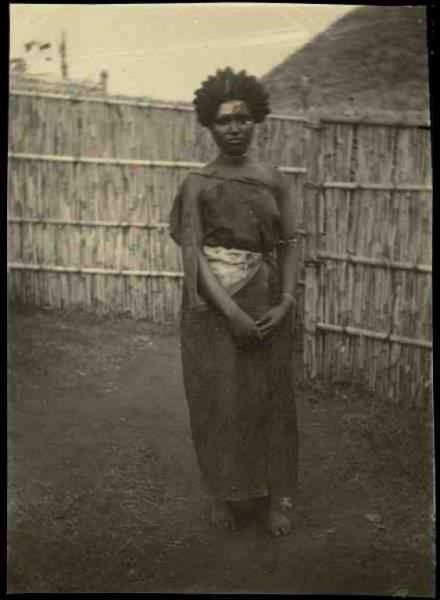

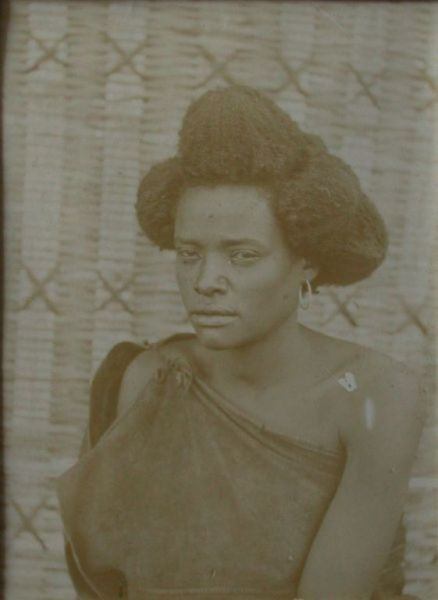

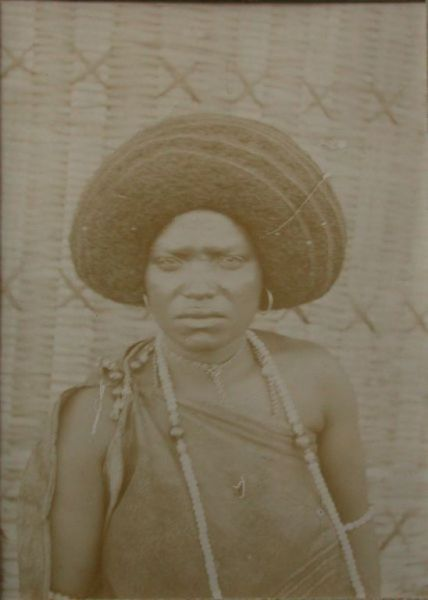

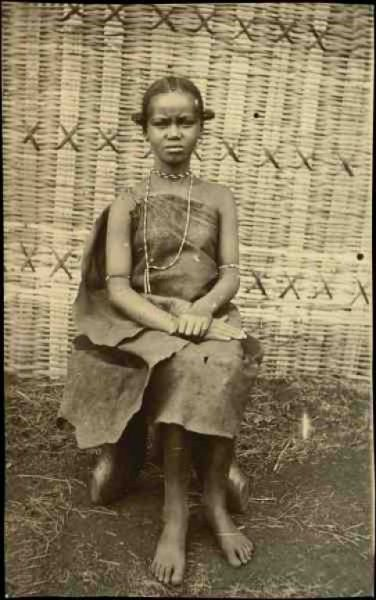

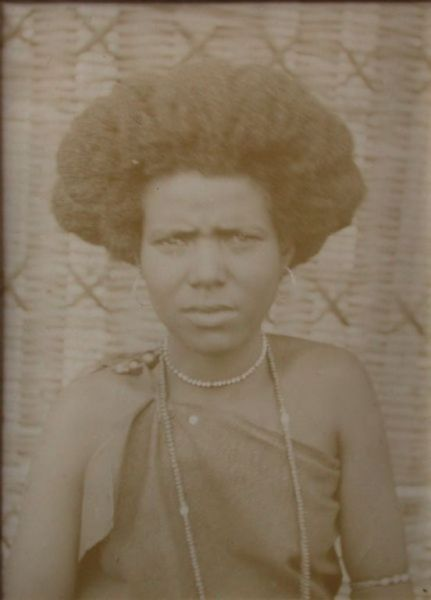

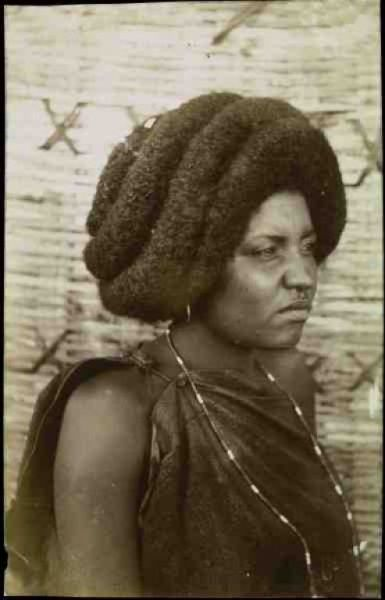

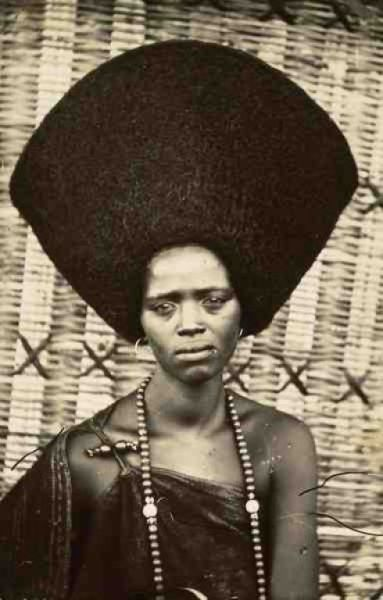

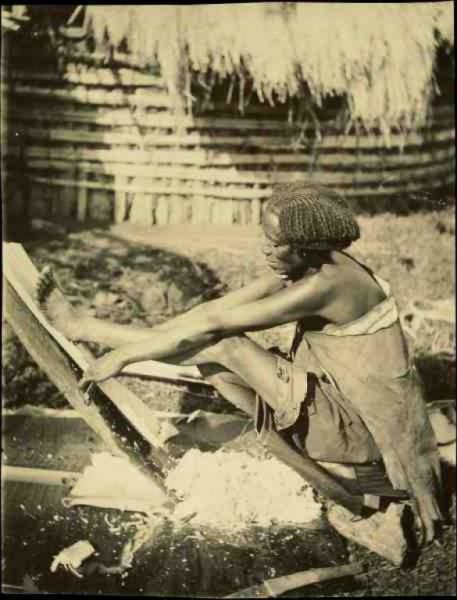

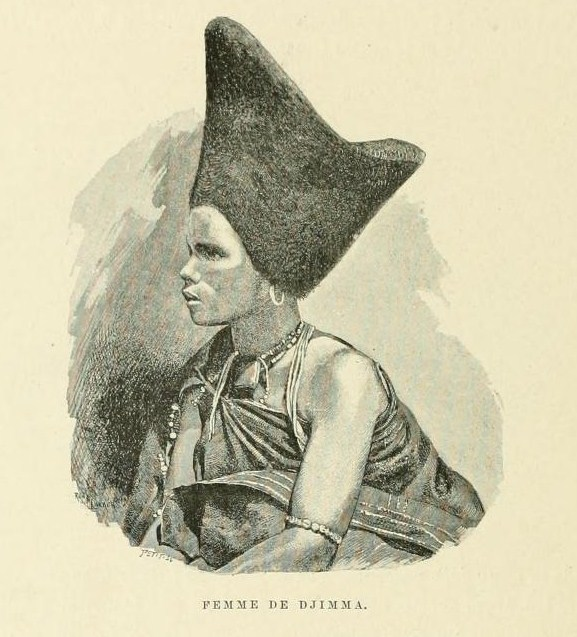

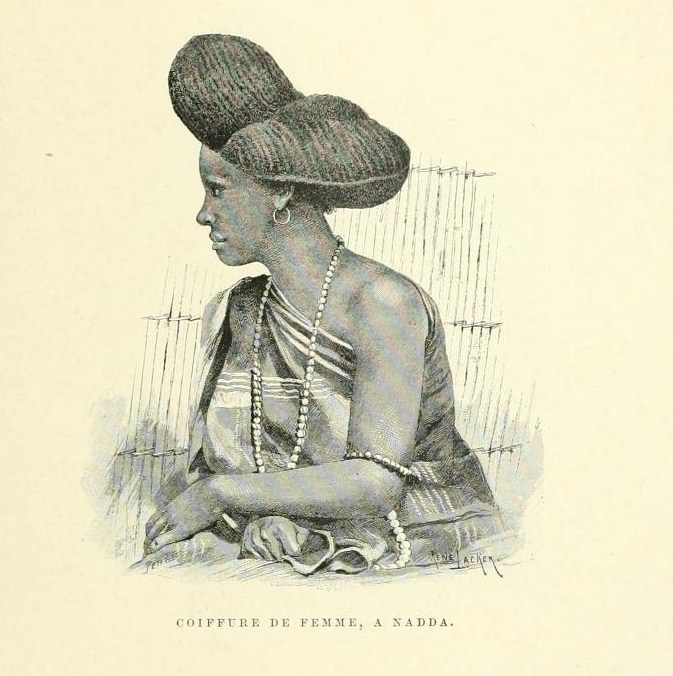

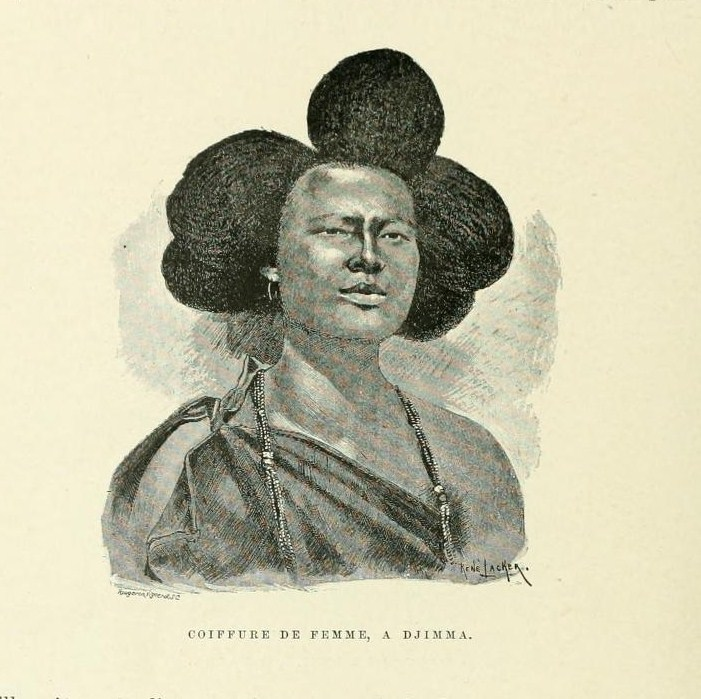

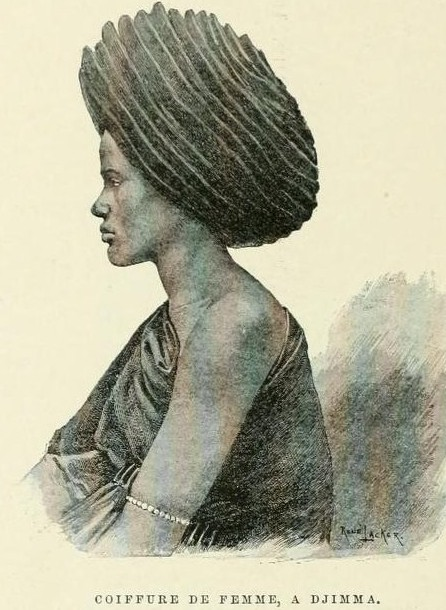

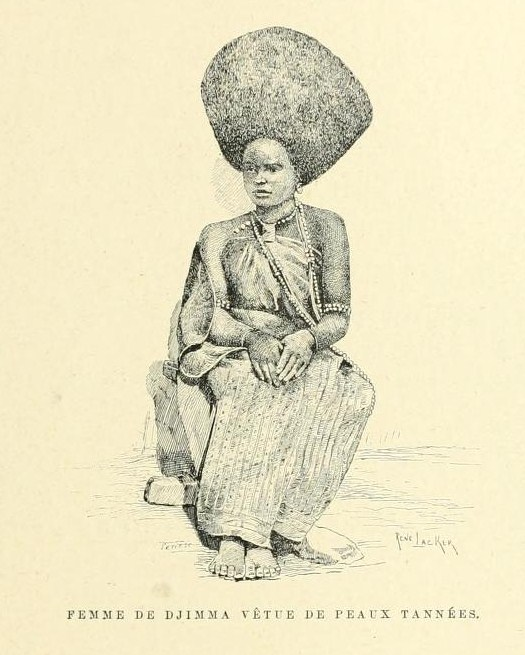

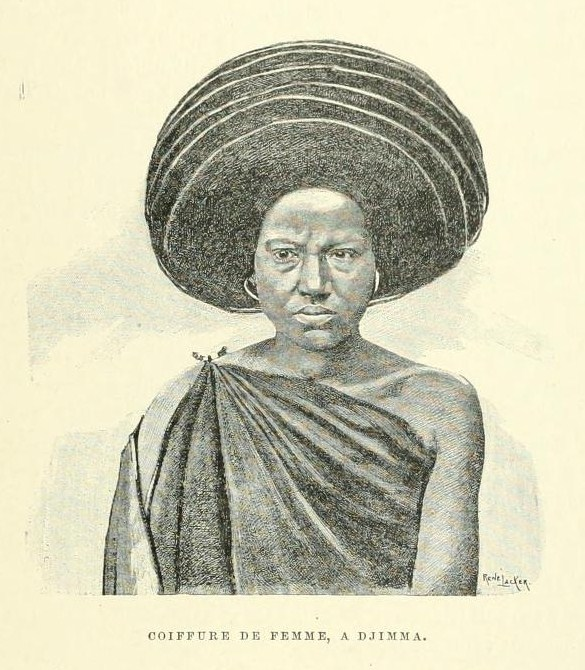

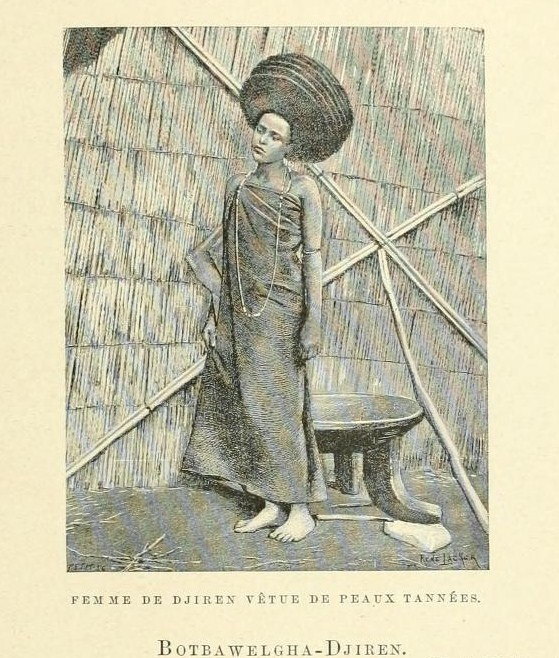

== See also ==
- List of rulers of Jimma
- List of Sunni dynasties
