= Gibe region =

Historical region in southwestern Ethiopia

Coordinates: 8°N 37°E

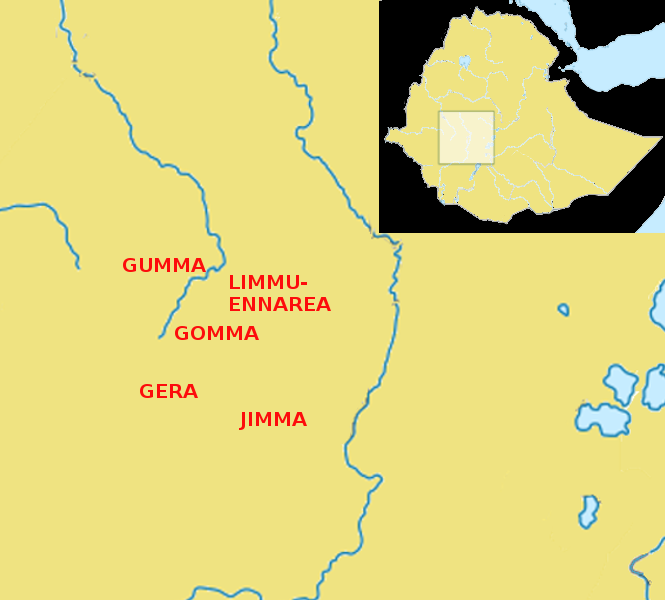
Map Showing the location of the Kingdoms

The Gibe region (Amharic: ጊቤ) was a historic region in modern southwestern Ethiopia, to the west of the Gibe and Omo Rivers, and north of the Gojeb. It was the location of the former Oromo and Sidama kingdoms of Gera, Gomma, Garo, Gumma, Jimma, and Limmu-Ennarea.

To the north of the Gibe region lay the Macha clan of the Oromo. Concerning the formation of five Gibe states, scholars had tried to put them orderly as they form states. For instance, the work of Mohammed has been accepted, he had briefly explained the formation of the five Gibe states with their respective founders/rulers. According to him, all were formed during the 19th century; it was Abba Gomol (1800-1825) who formed the state of Limmu-Enarea. It was Oncho Jilcha (1810-1830) who founded the kingdom of Guma. It was Abba Manno (1820-1840) who completed the process of state formation in Gomma. It was Abba Jifar I (1830-1854) who completed the formation of the kingdom of Jimma. It was Tullu Gunji (1835) who formed the state of Gera.

Until the mid 16th century, this region was part of the Sidama kingdoms of Ennarea, Hadiya, Janjero and Kaffa, tributary states to the Ethiopian Solomonic dynasty. The area was separated however, when the Oromo migrated into the area, destroying Hadiya, isolating Janjero, and reduced the area of Enerea and Kaffa. In the Gibe region, the Oromo came under the cultural influence of the kingdom of Kaffa, from whom they borrowed the concept of hereditary kingship (called Moti in all of the kingdoms except Limmu-Enerea, where for historical reasons the king was known as the Supera), and the practice of delimiting the boundaries or frontier of their states with a system of physical barriers.

These barriers consisted of palisades or dead hedges, which could extend for miles, separated from the barriers of the neighboring kingdom by a neutral strip (called moga), which was left uncultivated and inhabited only by brigands and outlaws. Access into each kingdom was limited to guarded gates known as kella, where tolls were levied

These kingdoms had an economy based on exports of gold, civet musk, coffee, and slaves. G.W.B. Huntingford explains that slaves were taken in raids on the Macha tribe to the north, and in raids on the Sidamo kingdoms of Kaffa and Janjero; he also cites evidence to show that 7,000 people a year were sold each year, some to people inside Ethiopia, and some outside that country.

The Gibe region, with the rest of southwestern Ethiopia, was almost entirely annexed between 1886 and 1900 in a series of conquests by the generals of Emperor Menelik II. The kingdom of Jimma, through skillful diplomacy, managed to delay this fate until the death of its king Abba Jifar II in 1932.
