= Tiro Afeta =

District in Oromia Region, Ethiopia

Coordinates: 7°55′N 37°20′E

Tiro Afeta, also known as Nedi Gibe, is a woreda in Oromia Region, Ethiopia. Part of the Jimma Zone, Tiro Afeta is bordered on the south by Omo Nada, on the west by Kersa, on the north by Limmu Kosa, and on the east by Sokoru. The administrative center of the woreda is Dimtu.

== Overview ==
The altitude of this woreda ranges from 1640 to 2800 meters above sea level; mountains include Geshe, Haro, Gebera and Hako Albiti. Perennial rivers include the Gilgel Gibe, the Busa, the Nedi and the Aleltu. A survey of the land in this woreda shows that 26% is arable or cultivable (20.5% was under annual crops), 8.3% pasture, 14% forest, and the remaining 51.7% is considered built-up, degraded or otherwise unusable. Forest land includes the Gesha forest, part of the Tiro Becho State Forest. Teff and corn are important cash crops. Although coffee is another important cash crop of this woreda, less than 20 square kilometers are planted with this crop.

Industry in the woreda includes 52 grain mills. There were 25 Farmers Associations with 11,010 members and 7 Farmers Service Cooperatives with 7,283 members. Tiro Afeta has 34 kilometers of dry-weather road, for an average road density of 34.9 kilometers per 1000 square kilometers. About 71.5% of the urban and 9.8% of the rural population has access to drinking water.

== Population ==
The 2007 national census reported a total population for this woreda of 131,536, of whom 65,341 were men and 66,195 were women; 5,309 or 4.04% of its population were urban dwellers. The majority of the inhabitants were Muslim, with 92.44% of the population reporting they observed this belief, while 5.99% of the population said they practised Ethiopian Orthodox Christianity, and 2.49% were Protestant.

Based on figures published by the Central Statistical Agency in 2005, this woreda has an estimated total population of 130,554, of whom 66,732 are men and 63,822 are women; 2,328 or 1.78% of its population are urban dwellers, which is less than the Zone average of 12.3%. With an estimated area of 973.91 square kilometers, Tiro Afeta has an estimated population density of 134.1 people per square kilometer, which is less than the Zone average of 150.6.

The 1994 national census reported a total population for this woreda of 94,619, of whom 46,529 were men and 48,090 women; 1,302 or 1.38% of its population were urban dwellers at the time. The two largest ethnic groups reported in Tiro Afeta were the Oromo (93.71%), and the Yem (5.27%); all other ethnic groups made up 1.02% of the population. However according to one source, in the early 1990s 42,600 members of the Yem lived in 17 kebeles of this woreda. Oromiffa was spoken as a first language by 97.05%, and 2.38% spoke Yemsa; the remaining 0.57% spoke all other primary languages reported. The majority of the inhabitants were Muslim, with 92.04% of the population having reported they practiced that belief, while 6.71% of the population said they professed Ethiopian Orthodox Christianity, and 1.01% were Protestant.
