= Omo Nada =

Woredas in the Oromia Region of Ethiopia

Coordinates: 7°30′N 37°15′E

- Woreda
- Location within Ethiopia
- Country: Ethiopia
- Region: Oromia
- Zone: Jimma

Area
  - Total: 1,602.66 km^{2} (618.79 sq mi)
- Elevation: 1,000–3,340 m (3,280–10,960 ft)

Population (2007)
  - Total: 248,173
  - Density: 158.7/km^{2} (411/sq mi)

Demographics
  - Religion: Muslim (95.44%), Ethiopian Orthodox Christianity (2.93%), Protestant (1.49%)
- Time zone: UTC+3 (EAT)
- Major towns: Nada, Asendabo

Omo Nada is one of the woredas in the Oromia region of Ethiopia. Part of the Jimma Zone, Omo Nada is bordered on the south by the Gojeb River, which separates it from the Southern Nations, Nationalities and Peoples Region (SNNPR), on the west by Dedo, on the northwest by Kersa, on the north by Nadhi Gibe, on the northeast by Sokoru, and on the east by the Omo River which separates it from the SNNPR. Nada is the administrative center of the district; other towns in Omo Nada include Asendabo.

== Overview ==
The altitude of this district ranges from 1,000 to 3,340 meters (3,280 to 10,960 feet) above sea level. Major peaks include Mounts Maigudo, Gudaje and Dasu Boreto. Perennial rivers include the Gilgel Gibe, Nada Guda and Beyem. A survey of the land in this district shows that 56.8% is arable or cultivable (36.3% was under annual crops), 25.2% pasture, 6.3% forest, and the remaining 11.7% is considered swampy, degraded or otherwise unusable. Teff and wheat are important cash crops. Coffee is also an important cash crop; between 20 and 50 square kilometers are planted with this crop.

Industry in this district includes 26 grain mills. Coal, iron and manganese deposits have been identified in Omo Nada, but have not yet been developed. There were 37 Farmers Associations with 17,295 members and 17 Farmers Service Cooperatives with 4,608 members. Omo Nada has 67 kilometers of dry-weather and 36 of all-weather road, for an average road density of 64.2 kilometers per 1000 square kilometers. About 44% of the urban and 5.2% of the rural population has access to drinking water.

== Demographics ==
The 2007 national census reported a total population of 248,173, of whom 124,289 were men and 123,884 were women. 12,215 or 4.92% of its population were urban dwellers. With an estimated area of 1,602.66 square kilometers, Omo Nada has an estimated population density of 158.7 people per square kilometer, which is greater than the Zone average of 150.6. The majority of the inhabitants were Muslim, with 95.44% of the population reporting they observed this belief, while 2.93% of the population said they practiced Ethiopian Orthodox Christianity, and 1.49% were Protestant.

To contrast, the 1994 national census reported a total population for this district of 182,995, of whom 91,662 were men and 91,333 women; 7,249 or 3.96% of its population were urban dwellers at the time. The five largest ethnic groups reported in Omo Nada were the Oromo (91.2%), the Yem (3.07%), the Amhara (1.65%), the Hadiya (1.32%), and the Kullo (1.1%); all other ethnic groups made up 1.66% of the population. However according to one source, in the early 1990s 72,200 members of the Yem lived in 26 villages in this district. Oromiffa was spoken as a first language by 94.16%, 2.17% spoke Amharic, 1.28% spoke Hadiya, and 1.28% spoke Kullo; the remaining 1.11% spoke all other primary languages reported. The majority of the inhabitants were Muslim, with 95.64% of the population having reported they practiced that belief, while 3.24% of the population said they professed Ethiopian Orthodox Christianity, and 1.06% were Protestant.

== Climate ==
Climate data for Asendabo, elevation 1,870 m (6,140 ft)
Month	Jan	Feb	Mar	Apr	May	Jun	Jul	Aug	Sep	Oct	Nov	Dec	Year
Mean daily maximum °C (°F)	29.1 (84.4)	30.0 (86.0)	29.3 (84.7)	28.8 (83.8)	27.2 (81.0)	25.7 (78.3)	23.8 (74.8)	23.7 (74.7)	23.7 (74.7)	27.1 (80.8)	27.3 (81.1)	28.3 (82.9)	27.0 (80.6)
Daily mean °C (°F)	18.7 (65.7)	20.3 (68.5)	20.8 (69.4)	21.0 (69.8)	20.2 (68.4)	19.3 (66.7)	18.7 (65.7)	18.6 (65.5)	18.0 (64.4)	18.6 (65.5)	17.7 (63.9)	17.8 (64.0)	19.1 (66.5)
Mean daily minimum °C (°F)	8.3 (46.9)	10.8 (51.4)	12.3 (54.1)	13.1 (55.6)	13.1 (55.6)	13.0 (55.4)	13.3 (55.9)	13.3 (55.9)	12.1 (53.8)	10.1 (50.2)	7.9 (46.2)	7.3 (45.1)	11.2 (52.2)
Average precipitation mm (inches)	20 (0.8)	36 (1.4)	85 (3.3)	75 (3.0)	152 (6.0)	189 (7.4)	211 (8.3)	192 (7.6)	115 (4.5)	48 (1.9)	28 (1.1)	13 (0.5)	1,164 (45.8)
Average relative humidity (%)	62	62	64	67	72	76	79	80	77	72	67	64	70
Source: FAO
