= Seka Chekorsa (woreda) =

Administrative division of Ethiopia

Coordinates: 7°30′N 36°05′E

Seka Chekorsa is one of the woredas in the Oromia Region of Ethiopia. It is named after the administrative center, Seka Chekorsa. Part of the Jimma Zone, Seka Chekorsa is bordered on the south by the Gojeb River which separates it from the Southern Nations, Nationalities and Peoples Region, on the west by Gera, on the northwest by Gomma, on the north by Mana, on the northeast by Kersa, and on the east by Dedo. Villages include Bedadi. Shebe Senbo woreda was part of Seka Chekorsa woreda.

== Overview ==
The altitude of this woreda ranges from 1580 to 2560 meters above sea level; perennial rivers include the Abono, Anja, Gulufa and Meti. A survey of the land in this woreda shows that 45.3% is arable or cultivable (44.9% was under annual crops), 6.1% pasture, 25.8% forest, and the remaining 22.8% is considered swampy, degraded or otherwise unusable. Khat, peppers, fruits and teff are important cash crops. Coffee is another important cash crop for this woreda; over 50 square kilometers are planted with this crop.

Industry in the woreda includes 16 grain mills, one bakery and one coffee hulling mill. Coal, oil shale, clay and salt deposits are known to exist in Seka Chekorsa, but commercial extraction has not begun. There were 53 Farmers Associations with 33,980 members and 15 Farmers Service Cooperatives with 21,413 members. Seka Chekorsa has 30 kilometers of dry-weather and 75 of all-weather road, for an average of road density of 65.6 kilometers per 1000 square kilometers, which is less than the Zonal average of 70 per 1000 square kilometers.

== Population ==
The 2007 national census reported a total population for this woreda of 208,096, of whom 104,758 were men and 103,338 were women; 7,029 or 3.38% of its population were urban dwellers. The majority of the inhabitants were Moslem, with 86.66% of the population reporting they observed this belief, while 10.93% of the population said they practised Ethiopian Orthodox Christianity, and 2.27% were Protestant.

Based on figures published by the Central Statistical Agency in 2005, this woreda has an estimated total population of 336,277, of whom 168,863 were males and 167,414 were females; 14,574 or 4.33% of its population are urban dwellers, which is less than the Zone average of 12.3%. With an estimated area of 1,607.66 square kilometers, Seka Chekorsa has an estimated population density of 209.2 people per square kilometer, which is greater than the Zone average of 150.6.

The 1994 national census reported a total population for this woreda of 242,302, of whom 121,261 were men and 121,041 women; 8,152 or 3.36% of its population were urban dwellers at the time. The five largest ethnic groups reported in Seka Chekorsa were the Oromo (71.72%), the Yem (16.36%), the Amhara (4.82%), the Kafficho (4.54%), and the Kullo (1.45%); all other ethnic groups made up 5.78% of the population. However according to one source, in the early 1990s about 150,000 members of the Yem lived in 34 villages of this woreda. Oromiffa was spoken as a first language by 88.36%, 5.68% spoke Amharic, 2.63% spoke Yemsa, 2.21% spoke Kafa, and 0.76% spoke Kullo; the remaining 0.36% spoke all other primary languages reported. The majority of the inhabitants were Muslim, with 83.93% of the population having reported they practiced that belief, while 15.27% of the population said they professed Ethiopian Orthodox Christianity.
