= Kersa, Jimma =

District in Oromia Region, Ethiopia

Coordinates: 7°45′N 37°05′E

Kersa is a woreda in the Jimma Zone of the Oromia Region of Ethiopia. It is bordered on the south by Dedo, on the southwest by Seka Chekorsa, on the west by Mana, on the north by Limmu Kosa, on the northeast by Tiro Afeta, and on the southeast by Omo Nada. Towns and cities in Kersa include Jimma, the zone's capital, and Serbo.

== Overview ==
The altitude of this woreda ranges from 1740 to 2660 meters above sea level; mountains include Sume, Gora, Kero, Folla and Jiren. Perennial rivers include the Gilgel Gibe, Karsa, Bulbul, Melekta and the Birbirsa. A survey of the land in this woreda shows that 58.6% is arable or cultivable (37.5% was under annual crops), 17.3% pasture, 6.0% forest, and the remaining 18.9% is considered swampy, degraded or otherwise unusable. Coffee is an important cash crop of this woreda. Over 50 square kilometers are planted with this crop.

Industry in the woreda includes 14 grain mills. There were 27 Farmers Associations with 16,559 members and 4 Farmers Service Cooperatives with 4,033 members. Kersa has 14 kilometers of dry-weather and "a few" kilometers of all-weather road, for a minimum average road density of 14.3 kilometers per 1000 square kilometers, which is less than the Zonal average of 70 per 1000 square kilometers. About 55% of the urban and 11.35% of the rural population has access to drinking water.

== Demographics ==
The 2007 national census reported a total population for this woreda of 165,391, of whom 83,579 were men and 81,812 were women; 5,426 or 3.28% of its population were urban dwellers. The majority of the inhabitants were Moslem, with 88.87% of the population reporting they observed this belief, while 10% of the population said they practised Ethiopian Orthodox Christianity.

Based on figures published by the Central Statistical Agency in 2005, this woreda has an estimated total population of 329,629, of whom 162,690 are men and 166,939 are women; 165,083 or 50.08% of its population are urban dwellers, which is greater than the Zone average of 12.3%. With an estimated area of 978.6 square kilometers, Kersa has an estimated population density of 336.8 people per square kilometer, which is greater than the Zone average of 150.6.

The 1994 national census reported a total population for this woreda of 212,038, of whom 106,329 were men and 105,709 women; 92,265 or 43.51% of its population were urban dwellers at the time. The six largest ethnic groups reported in Kersa were the Oromo (66.19%), the Amhara (10.56%), the Yem (6.92%), the Kullo (5.47%), the Kafficho (3.28%), and the Sebat Bet Gurage (1.8%); all other ethnic groups made up 5.78% of the population. Oromiffa was spoken as a first language by 67.41%, 22.79% spoke Amharic, 2.83% spoke Kullo, and 2.3% spoke Yemsa; the remaining 1.52% spoke all other primary languages reported. The majority of the inhabitants were Muslim, with 65.49% of the population having reported they practiced that belief, while 31.57% of the population said they professed Ethiopian Orthodox Christianity, and 2.56% were Protestant.
