= Janjero =

Janjero may refer to

- Kingdom of Janjero, a former kingdom in Ethiopia
- Yem people, an ethnic group in Ethiopia also known as Janjero
- Yemsa language, a language spoken in Ethiopia
