= Seka Chekorsa =

Seka Chekorsa (also transliterated Seqqa Chekorsa) is a town in southern Ethiopia. Located in the Jimma Zone of the Oromia Region, this town has a latitude and longitude of 07°35′N 36°33′E. It is the administrative center of Seka Chekorsa woreda.

Seka Chekorsa holds its weekly market on Sundays.

Based on figures from the Central Statistical Agency in 2005, Seka Chekorsa has an estimated total population of 7,284 of whom 3,544 were males and 3,740 were females. The 1994 national census reported a total population for this town of 4,076, of whom 1,922 were men and 2,154 women. The five largest ethnic groups reported in Seka Chekorsa were the Oromo (63.27%), the Amhara (15.8%), the Kafficho (5.37%), the Kullo (5.32%), and the Yem (4.44%); all other ethnic groups made up 5.8% of the population. Oromiffa was spoken as a first language by 59.89%, 32.19% spoke Amharic, 2.72% spoke Kafa, 2.01% spoke Kullo, and 1.72% spoke Yemsa; the remaining 1.47% spoke all other primary languages reported. The majority of the inhabitants were Muslim, with 53.46% of the population having reported they practiced that belief, while 41.66% of the inhabitants said they professed Ethiopian Orthodox Christianity, and 2.01% were Protestant.
