= Limmu Sakka =

District of the Oromia Region of Ethiopia

Coordinates: 8°20′N 37°00′E

Limmu Sakka is one of the woredas in the Oromia Region of Ethiopia. It is named in part after the former kingdom of Limmu-Ennarea, whose territories included the area this woreda now covers. Part of the Jimma Zone, Limmu Sakka is bordered on the southwest by the Didessa River which separates it from the Illubabor Zone, on the northwest by the Misraq Welega Zone, on the northeast by the Gibe River which separates it from the Mirab Shewa Zone, and on the southeast by Limmu Kosa. The administrative center of the woreda is Atnago; other towns include Saqqa, the capital of the former kingdom of Limmu-Ennarea.

== Overview ==
Dora Gabena, Chalte and Ato Kelala are amongst the highest points in this woreda. A survey of the land in Limmu Sakka shows that 57.3% is arable or cultivable (7.7% was under annual crops), 22.8% pasture, 4.9% forest, and the remaining 15% is considered swampy, degraded or otherwise unusable. Teff, oranges and bananas are important cash crops. Coffee is also an important cash crop for this woreda; over 5,000 hectares are planted with this crop.

Industry in the woreda includes 61 grain mills, one coffee pulping and one coffee hulling mill. There were 42 Farmers Associations with 24,540 members and 10 Farmers Service Cooperatives with 8691 members. Limmu Sakka has 42 kilometers of dry-weather and 64 all-weather road, for an average of road density of 43.9 kilometers per 1000 square kilometers. About 54.6% of the urban and 10.9% of the rural population have access to drinking water.

== History ==
The Zonal Food Security and Disaster Prevention Office reported in December, 2006 that 3,466 farmer households with 15,000 members who were part of the resettlement program in Limmu Sakka and Chora Botor woredas have achieved food self-sufficiency within a short time. These settlers came from the Arsi, Bale, Mirab and Misraq Hararghe Zones.

In June 2009, woreda officials announced that two health stations and 14 health posts various health facilities, built at a cost of over 11 million Birr, were ready for service. These would some 35 health posts and five health stations currently in operation.

== Demographics ==
The 2007 national census reported a total population for this woreda of 189,463, of whom 95,869 were men and 93,594 were women; 5,185 or 2.74% of its population were urban dwellers. The majority of the inhabitants were Moslem, with 62.13% of the population reporting they observed this belief, while 19.27% of the population said they practised Ethiopian Orthodox Christianity, and 17.87% were Protestant.

Based on figures published by the Central Statistical Agency in 2005, this woreda has an estimated total population of 169,559, of whom 86,713 are men and 82,846 are women; 6,082 or 3.59% of its population are urban dwellers, which is less than the Zone average of 12.3%. With an estimated area of 2,416.10 square kilometers, Limmu Sakka has an estimated population density of 70.2 people per square kilometer, which is less than the Zone average of 150.6.

The 1994 national census reported a total population for this woreda of 122,370, of whom 60,099 were men and 62,271 women; 3,400 or 2.78% of its population were urban dwellers at the time. The two largest ethnic groups reported in Limmu Sakka were the Oromo (95.19%), and the Amhara (3.4%); all other ethnic groups made up 1.41% of the population. Oromiffa was spoken as a first language by 96.68% of the population, and 2.83% spoke Amharic; the remaining 0.49% spoke all other primary languages reported. The majority of the inhabitants were Muslim, with 57.7% of the population having reported they practiced that belief, while 32.44% of the population said they professed Ethiopian Orthodox Christianity, and 9.72% were Protestant.
