= Limmu Kosa =

District in the Oromia Region of Ethiopia

Coordinates: 8°10′N 37°10′E

Limmu Kosa is one of the districts in the Oromia Region of Ethiopia. It is named in part after the former kingdom of Limmu-Ennarea, whose territories included the area this woreda now covers. Part of the Jimma Zone, Limmu Kosa is bordered on the south by Kersa, on the southwest by Mana, on the west by Gomma, on the northwest by the Didessa River which separates it from the Illubabor Zone, on the north by Limmu Sakka, on the northeast by the Gibe River which separates it from the west shewa zone and the Southern Nations, Nationalities and Peoples Region, on the east by Sokoru, and on the southeast by Tiro Afeta. The administrative center of this woreda is Limmu Inariya; other towns include Ambuye and Babu. Chora Botor woreda was separated from Limmu Kosa.

== Overview ==
The altitude of this woreda ranges from 1200 to 3020 meters above sea level. Rivers include the Awetu and the Dembi; notable landmarks include Lake Cheleleki and the Bolo Caves. Protected areas include the Tiro Boter Becho and Babia Folla forests, which cover 938.22 square kilometers. A survey of the land in this woreda shows that 34.9% is arable or cultivable (24.6% was under annual crops), 20% pasture, 39.7% forest, and the remaining 15.4% is considered degraded or built-up areas. Fruits and sugar cane are important cash crops. Coffee is another important cash crop of this woreda. Over 50 square kilometers are planted with this crop.

Industry in the district includes 57 Farmers Associations with 32,194 members and 19 Farmers Service Cooperatives with 17,962 members. Limmu Kosa has 71 kilometers of dry-weather and 111 all-weather road, for an average of road density of 75.3 kilometers per 1000 square kilometers. About 75% of the urban and 5.9% of the rural population have access to drinking water.

== Demographics ==
The 2007 national census reported a total population for this District of 161,338, of whom 81,462 were men and 79,876 were women; 14,842 or 9.2% of its population were urban dwellers. The majority of the inhabitants were Moslem, with 72.6% of the population reporting they observed this belief, while 24.41% of the population said they practised Ethiopian Orthodox Christianity, and 2.72% were Protestant.

Based on figures published by the Central Statistical Agency in 2005, this District has an estimated total population of 254,911, of whom 128,770 are men and 126,141 are women; 19,932 or 7.82% of its population are urban dwellers, which is less than the Zone average of 12.3%. With an estimated area of 2,880.00 square kilometers, Limmu Kosa has an estimated population density of 88.5 people per square kilometer, which is less than the Zone average of 150.6.

The 1994 national census reported a total population for this District of 182,160, of whom 90,477 were men and 91,683 women; 11,141 or 6.12% of its population were urban dwellers at the time. The five largest ethnic groups reported in Limmu Kosa were the Oromo (80.94%), the Amhara (11.33%), the Kullo (1.61%), the Kafficho (1.02%), and the Tigray (1.01%); all other ethnic groups made up 4.09% of the population. Oromiffa was spoken as a first language by 81.07%, 14.81% spoke Amharic, 0.92% spoke Kullo, and 0.85% spoke Tigrigna; the remaining 2.35% spoke all other primary languages reported. The majority of the inhabitants were Muslim, with 70.03% of the population having reported they practiced that belief, while 28.31% of the population said they professed Ethiopian Orthodox Christianity, and 9.72% were Protestant.
