= Mana (woreda) =

District of Ethiopia

Coordinates: 7°45′N 36°45′E

Mana (anciently which Named as "Ma'anna /Maanna") is one of the woredas in the Oromia Region of Ethiopia. Part of the Jimma Zone, Mana is bordered on the south by Seka Chekorsa, on the west by Gomma, on the north by Limmu Kosa, and on the east by Kersa. The administrative center of this woreda is Yebu.

The landscape of Mana includes mountains, high forests and plain divided by valleys. Mountains include Weshi and Bebella. Rivers include Aniso, Doha, Wanja, Yebu and Sogibo. A survey of the land in this woreda shows that 89.1% is arable or cultivable (86.1% was under annual crops), 2.7% pasture, 2.8% forest, and the remaining 5.4% is considered swampy, degraded or otherwise unusable. Khat is an important cash crop. Coffee is another important cash crop for this woreda; over 5,000 hectares are planted with this crop. On 28 September 2006, the Walta Information Center reported that farmers in this woreda sold 99,850 quintals of washed and unwashed coffee beans, earning 27.3 million Birr.

Industry in the woreda includes 10 grain mills, 7 coffee hulling and 6 coffee pulping mills. There were 22 Farmers Associations with 20,434 members and 12 Farmers Service Cooperatives with 16,256 members. Mana has 8.5 kilometers of dry-weather and "a few" kilometers of all-weather road, for a minimum average road density of 17.7 kilometers per 1000 square kilometers, which is far less than the Zonal average of 70 per 1000 square kilometers. About 61% of the urban and 17% of the rural population has access to drinking water.

== Population ==
The 2007 national census reported a total population for this woreda of 146,675, of whom 74,698 were men and 71,977 were women; 4,393 or 3% of its population were urban dwellers. The majority of the inhabitants were Moslem, with 90.23% of the population reporting they observed this belief, while 8.44% of the population said they practised Ethiopian Orthodox Christianity, and 1.15% were Protestant.

Based on figures published by the Central Statistical Agency in 2005, this woreda has an estimated total population of 160,096, of whom 80,481 are men and 79,615 are women; 5,471 or 3.42% of its population are urban dwellers, which is less than the Zone average of 12.3%. With an estimated area of 478.91 square kilometers, Mana has an estimated population density of 334.3 people per square kilometer, which is greater than the Zone average of 150.6.

The 1994 national census reported a total population for this woreda of 115,600, of whom 57,795 were men and 57,805 women; 3,059 or 2.65% of its population were urban dwellers at the time. The five largest ethnic groups reported in Mana were the Oromo (82.6%), the Yem (6.16%), the Kullo (5.79%), the Amhara (2.02%), and the Kafficho (1.26%); all other ethnic groups made up 2.17% of the population. However, according to one source, in the early 1990s 20 kebeles of this woreda had 17,000 members of the Yem, which would increase their percentage of the population. Oromiffa was spoken as a first language by 88.71%, 4.1% spoke Amharic, 3.28% spoke Kullo, and 2.55% spoke Yemsa; the remaining 1.52% spoke all other primary languages reported. The majority of the inhabitants were Muslim, with 88.9% of the population having reported they practiced that belief, while 10.63% of the population said they professed Ethiopian Orthodox Christianity.
