= Yemsa =

Yemsa may refer to:

- the Yemsa people
- the Yemsa language
