= Sokoru =

Woreda or district of Ethiopia

Coordinates: 8°05′N 37°30′E

Sokoru (also transliterated Sekoru) is one of the woredas in the Oromia Region of Ethiopia. This woreda is named after the former awraja of the same name, and covering much of the same territory as the current woreda, as well as its administrative center, Sokoru. Part of the Jimma Zone, Sokoru is bordered on the south by Omo Nada, on the west by Tiro Afeta, and on the north and east by the Southern Nations, Nationalities and Peoples Region; the Gibe River defines the northern boundary. Other towns in this woreda include Deneba, Kumbi and Natri.

== Overview ==
The altitude of this woreda ranges from 1160 to 2940 meters above sea level; the highest points include Ali Shashema, Ali Derar and Kumbi. Perennial rivers include the Gilgel Gibe a tributary of the Gibe, and the Kawar; seasonal streams include the Melka Luku. A survey of the land in this woreda shows that 36.6% is arable or cultivable, 16.8% pasture, 17.2% forest, and the remaining 29.4% is built-up or degraded. The Abelti-Gibe State Forest covers 159 square kilometers of the forested area. Teff is one important cash crop. Although coffee is another important cash crop of this woreda, less than 20 square kilometers are planted with this crop.

Industry in the woreda includes 21 grain mills and 2 furniture factories. There were 36 Farmers Associations with 14,161 members and 8 Farmers Service Cooperatives with 14,161 members. Sokoru has no kilometers of either dry-weather or all-weather road. About 72% of the urban population and 10.1% of the rural has access to drinking water.

== Population ==
The 2007 national census reported a total population for this woreda of 136,320, of whom 68,469 were men and 67,851 were women; 12,724 or 9.33% of its population were urban dwellers. The majority of the inhabitants were Moslem, with 91.63% of the population reporting they observed this belief, while 6.99% of the population said they practised Ethiopian Orthodox Christianity, and 1.19% were Protestant.

Based on figures published by the Central Statistical Agency in 2005, this woreda has an estimated total population of 157,552, of whom 79,305 were males and 78,247 were females; 19,676 or 12.49% of its population are urban dwellers, which is about the same as the Zone average of 12.3%. With an estimated area of 923.44 square kilometers, Sokoru has an estimated population density of 170.6 people per square kilometer, which is greater than the Zone average of 150.6.

The 1994 national census reported a total population for this woreda of 111,358, of whom 55,470 were men and 55,888 women; 11,006 or 9.88% of its population were urban dwellers at the time. The six largest ethnic groups reported in Sokoru were the Oromo (77.73%), the Yem (8.19%), the Kebena (3.69%), the Hadiya (3.4%), the Amhara (2.7%), and the Sebat Bet Gurage (1.72%); all other ethnic groups made up 2.57% of the population. However according to one source, in the early 1990s the Yem formed a significant minority, with significant populations in Sokoru, Deneba, and the surrounding villages. Oromiffa was spoken as a first language by 83.74%, 4.62% spoke Amharic, 3.8% spoke Kebena, 3.43% spoke Yemsa, and 3.1% spoke Hadiya; the remaining 1.31% spoke all other primary languages reported. The majority of the inhabitants were Muslim, with 91.23% of the population having reported they practiced that belief, while 8.07% of the population said they professed Ethiopian Orthodox Christianity.
