= Kingdom of Yamma =

Kingdom in Ethiopia, 15th century to 1894

- c.15th century–1894
- Capital: Fofa; 7°51′00″N 37°31′00″E
- Religion: Christianity
- Government: Monarchy
- History
  - Established: c.15th century
  - Annexed by Ethiopian Empire: 1894
Succeeded by
Ethiopian Empire
- Today part of: Ethiopia

The Kingdom of Yamma, also spelled Yemma, was a small kingdom located in what is now Ethiopia. It lay in the angle formed by the Omo and the Jimma Gibe Rivers; to the west lay the Kingdom of Jimma and to the south the Kingdom of Garo. Three mountains — Mount Bor Ama, Mount Azulu, and Mount Toba — all distinguish the location of the former kingdom. It covered the area of present-day Sekoru district and Yem special woreda.

This kingdom was also known as Janjero. However, this an Amharic exonym that Yem people who inhabit the present-day site of this kingdom consider pejorative. The Yem people who inhabit the land of the former Kingdom of Yamma have been subjected to prejudice from other Ethiopians, and in the past some Yem speakers have expressed discomfort speaking their own language for fear of negative judgement.

== Overview ==
Although one of the Sidamo kingdoms, until its conquest in 1894 Yamma was "isolated, and had little to do with its neighbors, its rivers being very difficult to cross. Although first visited by Europeans in 1614, until the late 1950s this region remained poorly known to outsiders. As a result, its people were said to have preserved a number of "customs so barbarous and strange that there cannot be any more so."

Some of these alleged customs are as follows:

- The king had the right to take persons of either sex from their homes to either be sold into slavery, or to work for him.
- Maize had been grown in Yamma prior to the late 19th century, but a king forbade its further cultivation because "the cobs were better covered than he, and the 'beards' were like human hair."
- Human sacrifice was allegedly practiced until the Ethiopian conquest.
- If a man was wounded in war, his relatives killed him to prevent it being said that he died at the hands of the enemy.
- When a new king came to the throne, all victims of leprosy and ringworm were sought out and taken to a "hospital" on the other side of the Jimma Gibe River, where they were beheaded.

== History ==
Yamma is first mentioned in a victory song of Yeshaq I, as one of several states south of the Abay River that paid tribute in horses to the Emperor. The first kings of Yamma belonged to the Halmam Gama dynasty, which was ejected by the Mwa clan, who claimed to have come from the north.

In 1614, Father António Fernandes visited the kingdom while looking for a southern route to Malindi on the Indian Ocean. Father Fernandes met the king of Yamma, and found him

according to Custom in a fort of rail'd Tower, about six Yards high, liittle more or less, 7 Yards and a half over, as we shall see anon, and the Stairs up to it in the back Part. All the courtiers stood below, and he on the top of the Elevation, which was not unlike a Cart Wheel, sitting on a Carpet, and there it is he gives Audience, decides Controversies, and dispatches all Business. He was clad in a white Silk Indian Garment, and was himself as black as Cole, but had not the Features of a Cafre.

In 1844, warriors of the Kingdom of Jimma defeated the army of Yamma, and the king of Yamma was taken prisoner. He regained his freedom in 1847, and resumed his struggle against his more powerful neighbor.

Jimma conquered part of Yamma in the 1880s. The rest of the kingdom was annexed in the reign of Menelik II in 1894, and its last king, Abba Bagibo, fled to the Gurage country, but eventually made his submission to Emperor Menelik. His son Abba Chabsa became a Christian, and adopted the name Gabra Madhen, and served the Ethiopian who held the fief.

During the reorganization of the provinces in 1942, the former kingdom was absorbed to become part of the Kaffa Province. However, with the new constitution of 1995, the area Yamma once occupied became the Yem Special Woreda, which was added to the Southern Nations, Nationalities, and Peoples Region to form the enclave of the Region west of the Omo River.

== List of rulers ==
Term	Incumbent	Notes
????	Foundation of Chako state (known as Gimira by the Ethiopians)	
Koyniyab Dynasty
???? to ????	Wurkenbe, Koynab	
???? to ????	Buzab, Koynab	
???? to ????	Zita, Koynab	
???? to ????	Tureta, Koynab	
???? to ????	Koyns, Koynab	
???? to ????	Duka, Koynab	
???? to 1955	Bangarsa, Koynab	
1955	Dynasty extinct	
