= Bedadi =

Bedadi may refer to one of the following:

- Bedadi, Ethiopia, village in south-western Ethiopia
- Bedadi, Pakistan, village in North-West Frontier Province, Pakistan
