= Dedo =

Dedo may refer to:

== People ==
- Dedo Mraz
- Dedo Difie Agyarko-Kusi
- Dedo I, Count of Wettin

== Places ==
- Dedo (woreda), Ethiopia
- Mount Dedo

== Other ==
- Dedo (grape)
