= Gilgel Gibe I Dam =

Dam in Ethiopia

- Location within Ethiopia
- Interactive map of Gilgel Gibe I Dam
- Country: Ethiopia
- Location: Jimma, Oromia Region
- Coordinates: 7°49′53″N 37°19′18″E
- Purpose: Power
- Status: Operational
- Construction began: 1988
- Opening date: 2004; 22 years ago
- Owner: Ethiopian Electric Power

Dam and spillways
- Type of dam: Embankment, rock-fill
- Impounds: Omo River
- Height: 40 m (130 ft)
- Length: 1,700 m (5,600 ft)

Reservoir
- Total capacity: 917,000,000 m^{3} (743,000 acre⋅ft)
- Active capacity: 717,000,000 m^{3} (581,000 acre⋅ft)

Gilgel Gibe I Power Station
- Coordinates: 7°54′31.88″N 37°22′24.33″E
- Commission date: 2004
- Type: Conventional, diversion
- Turbines: 3 x 61.3 MW Francis-type
- Installed capacity: 184 MW

The Gilgel Gibe I Dam is a rock-filled embankment dam on the Gilgel Gibe River in Ethiopia. It is located about 57 km (35 mi) northeast of Jimma in Oromia Region. The primary purpose of the dam is hydroelectric power production. The Gilgel Gibe I hydroelectric powerplant has an installed capacity of 184 MW, enough to power over 123,200 households. The dam is 1,700 m (5,600 ft) long and 40 m (130 ft) tall. Construction on the dam began in 1988 but work was halted in 1994. In 1995 construction restarted with a new construction firm. The power station was commissioned in 2004.

Water from the dam is diverted through a 9.2 km (5.7 mi) long tunnel to an underground power station downstream. After power generation, the water is discharged back into the Gilgel Gibe River to flow downstream northwards for roughly 2 km, only to enter a 26 km (16 mi) long tunnel through a mountain ridge to an underground power station (Gilgel Gibe II Power Station) at the lower-lying Omo River.
