= List of rulers of the Gibe state of Limu-'Enarya =

The following is a list of rulers of Gibe Kingdom of Limmu-Ennarea, located in present-day Ethiopia.

Tenure	Incumbent	Notes
Hinnare-tato (kings)
1450–1530	Kaba Seyon, Hinnare-tato	Founder
1530–1570	Sepenihi, Hinnare-tato	Semi-legendary conqueror of Ennarea
1570–1580	La'ashonhi, Hinnare-tato
1580–1603	Badancho, Hinnare-tato	First king to embrace Christianity
1605–1619	Benero, Hinnare-tato
1619–1630	Sysgayo, Hinnare-tato	Intrusive ruler
1630–1640	Emana Krestos, Hinnare-tato	Son of Benero
mid 17th century	Techochi, Hinnare-tato
mid 17th century	Gaha Nechocho, Hinnare-tato	Possibly related to the kings of Kaffa
late 17th century	Gawa Sherocho, Hinnare-tato	Possibly related to the kings of Kaffa
early 18th century	Shisafocho, Hinnare-tato
c.1750	Sacho Nechocho, Hinnare-tato
late 18th century	Tekle Sachi, Hinnare-tato
early 19th century	Garginocho, Hinnare-tato	Figurehead living in Kingdom of Kaffa
mid 19th century	Shagi Nechocho, Hinnare-tato	Figurehead living in Kingdom of Kaffa
late 19th century	Chechu Nechocho, Hinnare-tato	Figurehead living in Kingdom of Kaffa
Supera (kings) (horse names in parentheses)
c.1800	Ennarea conquered by the Macha Oromo, who founded the Kingdom of Limmu-Ennarea
1800 to 1825	Bofo, Supera (Abba Gomoli I)
1825 to 24 September 1861	Ibsa, Supera (Abba Bagibo)
1861 to 1883	..., Supera (Abba Bulgu)
1883 to 1891	..., Supera (Abba Gomoli II)	Limmu-Ennerea annexed by Ethiopia 1891

== See also ==
- Monarchies of Ethiopia
- List of emperors of Ethiopia
- Lists of rulers of Ethiopia
