= Limmu Inariya =

Town in southern Ethiopia

Limmu Inariya (Officially known as Limmu Inariya and formerly as Limu Suntu) is a town in southern Ethiopia. Located in the Jimma Zone of the Oromia Region. The town of Limmu Inariya is founded in 1952. One of the five wives of King Abba Jifar was from Limu, the wife's name was Limuti.

It has a latitude and longitude of 08°06′N 36°57′E with an elevation of 1773 meters above sea level. It is the administrative center of Limmu Kosa District.

== History ==
The town of Suntu was renamed Limmu Genet by Dejazmach Mesfin Sileshi when he was governor of the province. A coffee washing center was established in the late 1950s, and in its first regular working season (1956/57) processed 300 tons, which yielded about 75 tons of cleaned coffee beans.

In 1962, a trail connecting Genet to Welkite was passable by trucks in the dry season. An all-weather road south to Jimma was built in 1966 by the Highway Authority.

== Demographics ==
Based on figures from the Central Statistical Agency in 2005, Genet has an estimated total population of 12,037 of whom 6,063 were males and 5,974 were females. The 1994 census reported this town had a total population of 6,729 of whom 3,288 were males and 3,441 were females.

== See also ==
- Limmu Kos
- Jimma Zone
