= Chora Botor =

Woreda in Oromia Region, Ethiopia

Chora Botor is one of the woredas in the Oromia Region of Ethiopia. It was part of Limmu Kosa woreda. It is part of the Jimma Zone.

== Population ==
The 2007 national census reported a total population for this woreda of 91,738, of whom 46,454 were men and 45,284 were women; 1,043 or 1.14% of its population were urban dwellers. The majority of the inhabitants were Moslem, with 65.26% of the population reporting they observed this belief, while 29.27% of the population said they practised Ethiopian Orthodox Christianity, and 4.94% were Protestant.

It has 20 Kebeles.
