= Saqqa =

Saqqa Limmuu Saqqaa Limmu Saqqa
- Location within Ethiopia
- Coordinates: 8°12′N 36°56′E
- Country: Ethiopia
- Region: Oromia
- Zone: Jimma

Population (2005)
  - Total: 34,547
- Time zone: UTC+3 (EAT)

Saqqa (also known as Limmu Saqqa) is a town in south-western Ethiopia, and capital of the former Kingdom of Limmu-Ennarea. Located in the Jimma Zone of the Oromia Region, this town has a latitude and longitude of 08°12′N 36°56′E.

Based on figures from the Central Statistical Agency in 2005, this town has an estimated total population of 2,679 of whom 1,379 were men and 1,300 were women. The 1994 census reported this town had a total population of 1,497 of whom 748 were males and 749 were females. It is one of two towns in Limmu Sakka woreda.

== History ==
Saqqa became a town of importance when king Abba Bagibo made it his capital of Limmu-Ennarea in 1825, eclipsing his father's capital, Sappa. It thrived as the major marketplace of the Gibe region, where the different kinds of Muslim traders (known as Jabarti and Afkala) bought gold, coffee, and ivory. In the mid-to-late 1830s, Abba Bagibo forbade foreign merchants to travel beyond Saqqa, so merchants from Gondar, Adwa, Derita and Dawe were forced to meet in his capital their counterparts from Kaffa, Kullo, and other southern regions. However, by the mid-19th century it was eclipsed by the capital of the Kingdom of Jimma, Hirmata.

Here the Italian explorers Antonio Cecchi and Giovanni Chiarini were prisoners of king Abba Gomoli II from 23 November 1878 to 29 January 1879, when Negus Tekle Haymanot of Gojjam was finally able to persuade the rulers of Limmu-Ennarea to release them.during the Italian occupation, an Italian captain managed to handle the local population so badly that they were provoked and started something of a rebellion. By October 1937, reportedly the captain could hardly move outside his fort.
