= Shebe Senbo =

Woreda or district of Ethiopia

Shebe Senbo is one of the woredas in the Oromia Region of Ethiopia. It was part of Seka Chekorsa woreda. The major town is Shebe.

== Demographics ==
The 2007 national census reported a total population for this woreda of 112,068, of whom 56,737 were men and 55,331 were women; 5,265 or 4.7% of its population were urban dwellers. The majority of the inhabitants were Moslem, with 76.83% of the population reporting they observed this belief, while 21.26% of the population said they practised Ethiopian Orthodox Christianity, and 1.77% were Protestant.
