= Fofa, Ethiopia =

Town in Ethiopia

Fofa is a town in southern Ethiopia, and is the administrative center of the Yem special woreda. Located in the Southern Nations, Nationalities, and Peoples Region, this town has a latitude and longitude of 07°51′N 37°31′E with an elevation of 2506 meters above sea level.

Based on figures from the Central Statistical Agency in 2005, Fofa has an estimated total population of 1,929 of whom 966 were males and 963 were females. The 1994 national census reported this town had a total population of 1,065 of whom 535 were males and 530 were females.

The Guida described Fofa in 1938 as the main settlement of the Yem, lying among groves of Juniperus, with a view over the deep Omo valley, a covered market, and the residence of an Italian official.
