= Dedo (woreda) =

Woreda in the Oromia Region of Ethiopia

Coordinates: 7°25′N 37°00′E

Dedo is one of the woredas in the Oromia Region of Ethiopia. Part of the Jimma Zone, Dedo is bordered on the south by the Gojeb River and South Western Region of Ethiopia that recently formed and which separated from the Southern Nations, Nationalities and Peoples Region, on the west by Seka Cokorsa (woreda), on the north by Kersa, and on the east by Mencho (woreda) that recently separated from Dedo Woreda. The major town in Dedo is Sheki.

== Overview ==
The altitude of this woreda ranges from 880 to 3058 meters above sea level. Major peaks include Kora of Lalo Kebele and other Haro Gebis of Debele Kebele, Walla of Wala Kebele, Guf of Gaera Kebele and Gaara Muta of Defkela Kebele. Perennial rivers include the Gibe, Unta, Diddibo, Dawar, Diyo, Walla, Laga Misi, Jibitti, Ejjecho, Waro and Offele. A survey of the land in this woreda shows that 63.1% is arable or cultivable (38.4% was under annual crops), 13.6% pasture, 9.3% forest, and the remaining 14% is considered swampy, degraded or otherwise unusable. Masho, Coffee and Sesame were now cash crops of Dedo woreda- as editted from research conducted by Zinab Asaye Mersha (2022). Teff, corn and vegetables are important cash crops. Coffee is also an important cash crop for this woreda; over 50 square kilometers are planted with this crop.

Industry in the woreda includes 35 grain mills. Iron, coal and oil shale deposits are known in Dedo (particularly in Solla, Walla, Dilbi, Gera, Lalo, Sap'o, etc Kebeles), but have yet to be developed. There were 36 Farmers Associations with 29,781 members and 27 Farmers Service Cooperatives with 28,429 members. Dedo has 55 kilometers of dry-weather and 96 of all-weather road, for an average road density of 0.66km/1000km2 kilometers per 1000 square kilometers. (The Oromia Regional government has stated that a 34 kilometer road linking Dedo with Mole and Boneya is under construction.) About 68.9% of the urban and 83% of the rural population has access to drinking water.

== Population ==
The 2007 national census reported a total population for this woreda of 288,457, of whom 143,935 were men and 144,522 were women; 5,755 or 2% of its population were urban dwellers. The majority of the inhabitants were Moslem, with 92.98% of the population reporting they observed this belief, while 5.42% of the population said they practised Ethiopian Orthodox Christianity, and 1.47% were Protestant.

Based on figures published by the Central Statistical Agency in 2005, this woreda has an estimated total population of 308,544, of whom 155,596 are men and 152,948 are women; 7,718 or 2.5% of its population are urban dwellers, which is less than the Zone average of 12.3%. With an estimated area of 1,571.72 square kilometers, Dedo has an estimated population density of 196.3 people per square kilometer, which is greater than the Zone average of 150.6.

The 1994 national census reported a total population for this woreda of 223,262, of whom 111,295 were men and 111,967 women; 4,315 or 1.93% of its population were urban dwellers at the time. The five largest ethnic groups reported in Dedo were the Oromo (78.87%), the Yem (8.75%), the Kullo (8.54%), the Amhara (1.47%), and the Kafficho (0.94%); all other ethnic groups made up 1.43% of the population. Oromiffa was spoken as a first language by 87.03%, 7.3% Kullo, 2.55% spoke Yemsa, and 1.6% spoke Amharic; the remaining 1.52% spoke all other primary languages reported. The majority of the inhabitants were Muslim, with 89.57% of the population having reported they practiced that belief, while 10.11% of the population said they professed Ethiopian Orthodox Christianity.
