= Bedadi, Ethiopia =

Bedadi
- Location within Ethiopia
- Coordinates: 7°27′N 36°28′E
- Country: Ethiopia
- Region: Oromia
- Zone: Jimma
- Elevation: 1,533 m (5,030 ft)
- Time zone: UTC+3 (EAT)
- Climate: Am

Bedadi is a village in south-western Ethiopia. Located in Seka Chekorsa, a woreda in the Jimma Zone of the Oromia Region, it has a latitude and longitude of 7°27′N 36°28′E with an altitude of 1533 meters above sea level.

The Central Statistical Agency has not published an estimate for its 2005 population.
