= Šaper =

Šaper is a surname. Notable people with the surname include:

- Daliah Saper (fl. 2005–2017), American attorney
- Radomir Šaper (1925–1998), Serbian and Yugoslav basketball player and administrator
- Srđan Šaper (born 1958), Serbian and Yugoslav musician
