= Bedadi, Pakistan =

Bedadi
- Location within Pakistan
- Coordinates: 34.27°N 73.16°E
- Country: Pakistan
- Province: Khyber Pakhtunkhwa

Government
- Elevation: 970 m (3,180 ft)
- Time zone: UTC+5 (PST)

Bedadi is a small village in the Mansehra District of the Khyber Pakhtunkhwa, Pakistan. It is located at 34°27'0N 73°16'0E with an altitude of 970 metres (3185 feet), the village was damaged by the 2005 Kashmir earthquake.
