= Daliah Saper =

American attorney

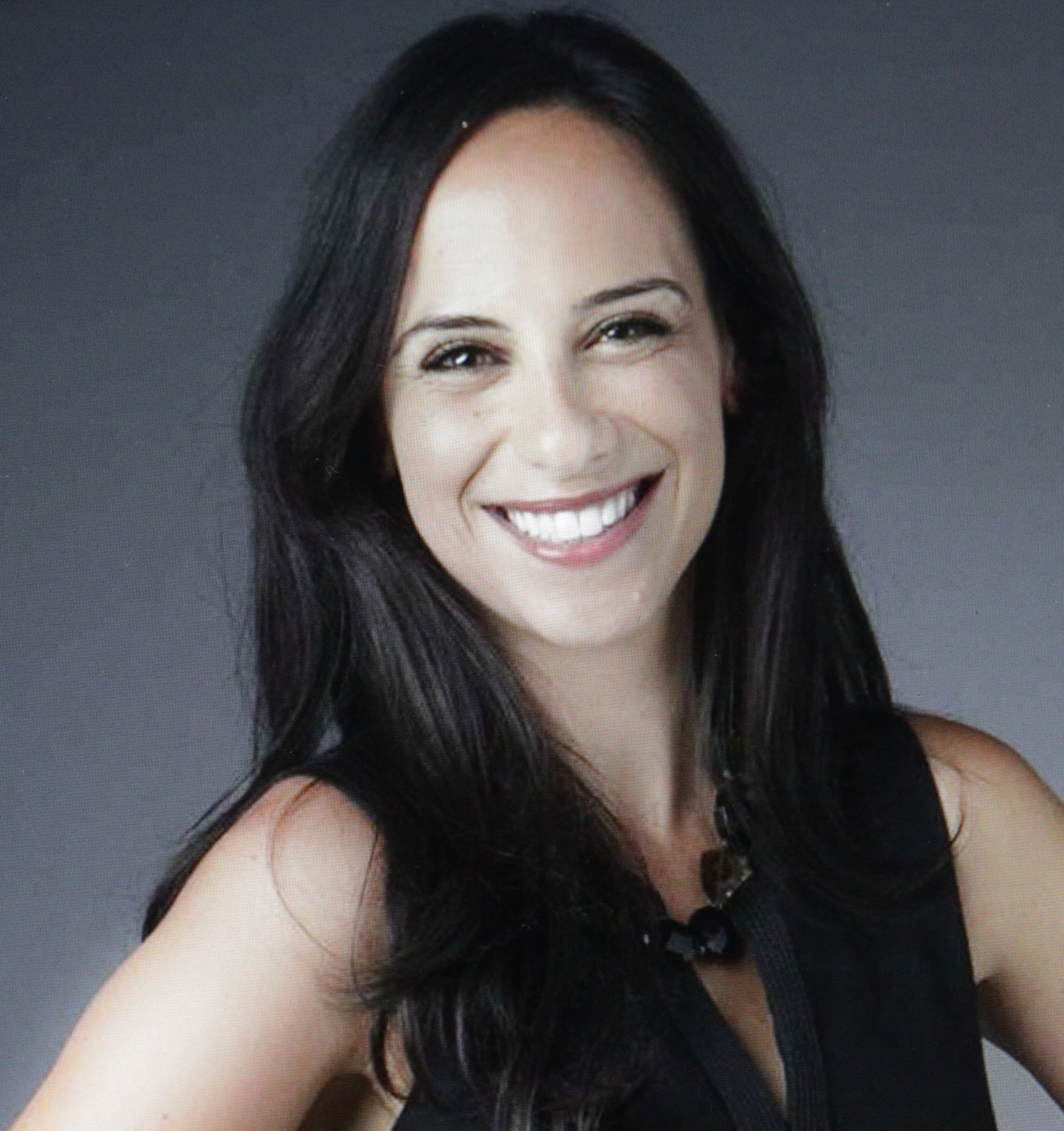
- Occupations: intellectual property; internet; entertainment; business attorney

Academic work
- Institutions: Loyola University Chicago School of Law

Daliah Saper is an American intellectual property, internet, entertainment and business attorney. She founded the Chicago law firm Saper Law Offices in 2005. She is also an adjunct professor at Loyola University Chicago School of Law.

== As a media personality ==
Saper appears regularly on television news programs such as Fox News, CNBC, ABC News, and Bloomberg to provide commentary on internet law. Additionally, Saper has been featured in digital publications including The New York Times, the Chicago Tribune, the Chicago Sun-Times, Wired, and Advertising Age.

Daliah was a featured speaker at SXSW 2017.

== Notable cases ==
Bonhomme v. St. James

In 2012, Saper represented Paula Bonhomme, a Los Angeles resident who was seduced by a fake social media account created by Illinois resident Janna St. James. Bonhomme eventually sued St. James for emotional distress and fraud. The case, which was argued before the Illinois Supreme Court, attracted widespread media attention regarding cybercrime.

== Accolades ==
In 2012, Saper was selected as a "40 Under 40" attorney by Law Bulletin Publishing Company. She has been named a "rising star" by Super Lawyers Magazine each year since 2009. Saper was a featured speaker at SXSW 2017 and the NYC Porn Film Festival 2016, discussing revenge porn litigation at both events.
