= Ennarea =

Medieval kingdom in western Ethiopia that lasted between 14th century to 18th century

Ennarea Ennarea
- 14th century–c. 1710
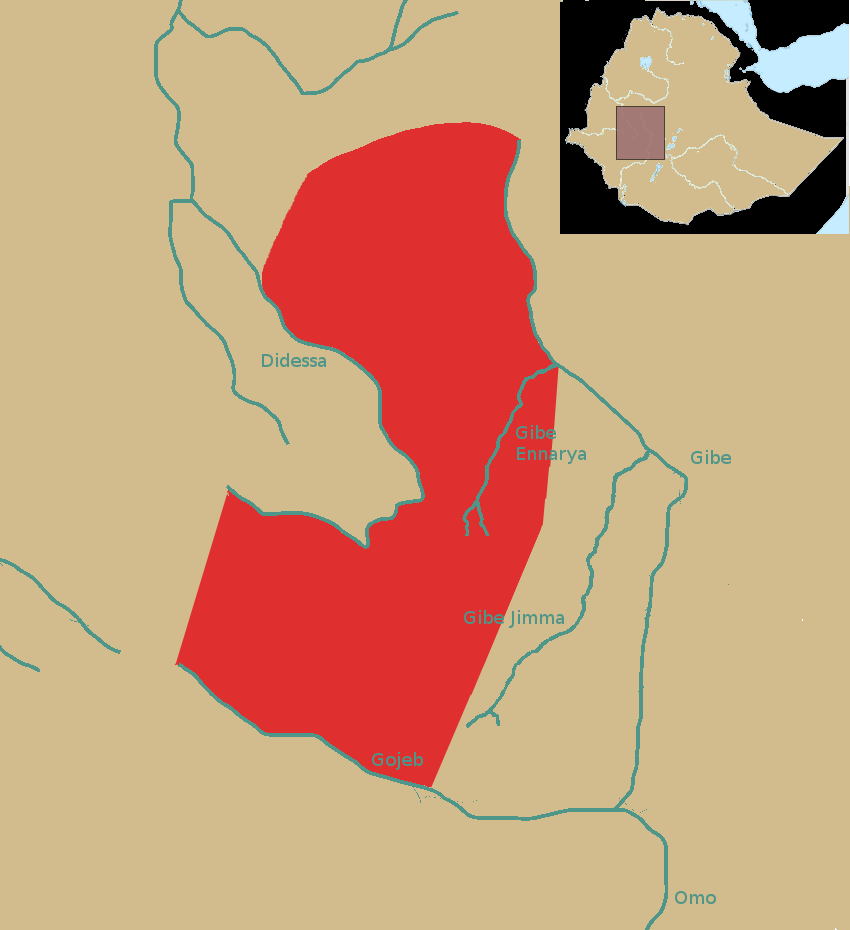
- Ennarea in around 1500
- Capital: Yadare, Gowi
- Common languages: Gonga
- Religion: Christianity (1587/8-1710, limited to nobility); African traditional religion
- Government: Monarchy
- Hinnare-tato
  - c. 1450: Kaba Siyon
  - Early 1700s: Shisafotchi
- Historical era: Middle Ages
  - Independence from Damot: 14th century
  - Conquered by Abyssinia: 14th-15th century
  - Disestablished: c. 1710
  - Deposition of last king: Late 19th century
Preceded by	Succeeded by
Kingdom of Damot	Kingdom of Limmu-Ennarea; Kingdom of Kaffa
- Today part of: Ethiopia

Ennarea, also known as E(n)narya or In(n)arya (Gonga: Hinnario), was a kingdom in the Gibe region in what is now western Ethiopia. It became independent from the kingdom of Damot in the 14th century and would be the most powerful kingdom in the region until its decline in the 17th century. Being located on the southwestern periphery of the Ethiopian Empire, Ennarea was its tributary throughout much of its history, supplying the emperor with gold and slaves. The culmination of this relationship was the Christianization of the Ennarean elite in the late 1580s. From the late 16th century the kingdom came under increasing pressure by the Oromo, who finally conquered Ennarea in around 1710.

Our knowledge of Ennarea primarily comes from oral traditions and a few foreign written sources, as it had no indigenous literacy tradition.

== History ==
=== Early period ===
According to oral traditions the royal Ennarean clan, the Hinnare Bushasho, originated in northern Ethiopia before settling in the Gibe region. In the 9th century Aksumite king Digna-Jan is said to have led a campaign into Innarya, accompanied by "150 priests carrying 60 consecrated tablets (tabot)".

In the 13th century, Ennarea was recorded to be a province of the Motalami's of Damot, a kingdom south of the Blue Nile. An early 19th-century document regarding the early history of Damot and Ennarea attests a political union of these two kingdoms.

=== Rise and peak of power ===
It appears that since the late 14th century (around the same time when Kaffa was founded in the south) Ennarea gained nominal independence from its northern neighbor, although it remained in close contact with it. While Damot was soon annexed by the Ethiopian Empire Ennarea developed to the most important kingdom of the non-Muslim south, replacing Damot as one of the biggest gold and slave mines and degrading Kaffa and Bosa to tributaries. By the reign of Yeshaq I (early 15th century) Ennarea is attested to have been a tributary of the empire, although it seems likely that it had been so already since the campaigns of emperor Amda Seyon 100 years earlier. In a song dedicated to Yeshaq it is stated that Ennarea had to pay a tribute to the empire in the form of gold, slaves and cattle.

=== Decline, fall, and aftermath ===
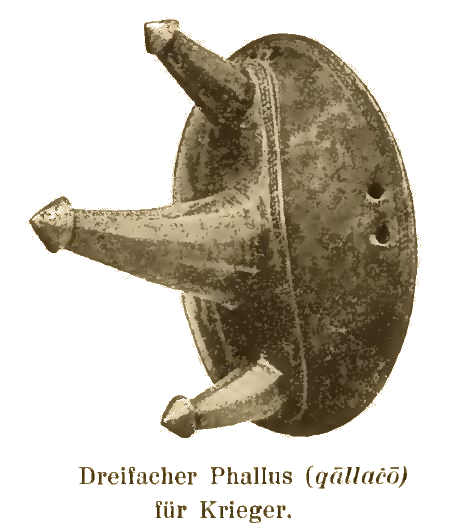
Phallic warrior headgear from Kaffa, dating to the 17th century. In the same period Kaffa seized control of Ennarea.

Between 1578 and 1586, the Borana Oromo conquered the Gibe region, eventually taking the territory from around Ennarea to the Blue Nile. During this period of war the Oromo formed a new federation, known as Sadacha. It was the Sadacha who would continue to wage war against Ennarea for the next 130 years. In 1588 the Oromo took over Ennarea. It was probably this invasion that triggered the Ennarean wish to convert to Christianity. In the same year, emperor Sarsa Dengel pushed south of the Nile, into Ennarea, to bring Christianity. Although Ennarea lost the land between the main Gibe river and Gibe Ennarea due to another Sadacha attack in 1594 it managed to expand north.

In the 17th century, the Ennarea dynasty declined, as the Oromo weakened its economy by cutting it off from the Ethiopian empire. Eventually, in the mid 17th century, the royal clan of Kaffa seized power in Ennarea. Thus, Kaffa, but also Sheka, became independent from Ennarea. In 1704, an expedition led by emperor Iyasu I reached the kingdom, where he was confronted with a civil war between two throne claimants. It seems that Iyasu's expedition succeeded in pushing back Kaffa south to the Gojeb river. Six years later, under the rule of Shisafotchi, Ennarea was finally overrun by the Sadacha.

After the fall of the kingdom, Shisafotchi led an exodus south of the Gojeb river, into Kaffa. By the early 19th century this Ennarean exile kingdom had been defeated and vassalized by Kaffa, although its kings remained in nominal office until the Agar Maqnat. Cultural assimilation, slavery, epidemics and political repression made the Ennarean people vanish into history. Meanwhile, the Oromo settled in what once constituted Ennarea, changed their mode of production from pastoralism to agriculture, and, by the early 19th century, founded five kingdoms: Limmu-Ennarea, Jimma, Gera, Gomma and Gumma.

== King and council ==
The kingship of Ennarea was a divine one: the king (Hinnare-tato) dined one time a day, always behind a curtain and with his meal resting on the back and shoulders of a slave. He probably also sat behind a curtain when a visitor came along, communicating with him via an intermediary, the Afe Busho. The kings wore rich golden jewelry, like a bracelet, a crown with a cross on its top as well as a phallic projection on the front (possibly gifted by emperor Sarsa Dengel in 1587) and two pieces representing the two sexes, symbolizing "eternal fertility and prosperity". Non-gold royal insignia consisted of a white-red-black (from left to right) flag, an umbrella and diverse musical instruments. Most kings were provided by the Hinnaro Bushasho clan, although it seemed to have been divided into two groups or lineages: a native one and one that claimed a northern, perhaps Amhara or Tigre origin. The latter were generally regarded as superior to the former. The kings had two residences: one in Yadare and one in Gowi.

The true seat of power in Ennarea did not rest with the king, however, but the council, the Mikretcho. A decision by the Mikretcho was absolute and could not be vetoed by the king. It was also them who decided what prince would become the next king. The council consisted of following title holders: the Bushashe-rasha (probably two brothers of the current king, who spoke for him on council meetings), the Hinnare-katemerasha (royal representative and leader in war), the Awa-rasha (the king's spokesman), the Barta-rasha (probably had a religious function) and the Gutchi-rasha (observer of Ennarea's slave trade). The Atche-rasha (responsible for the royal treasures) is also claimed to have been part of the council, though this is not certain.

== Economy ==
Ennarea was "a rich slave state, completely exploited of its natural and human resources for the benefit of foreign overlords.” The exports of Ennarea focused primarily on slaves and gold. Its gold was already mentioned in the 14th century and was recorded to be of extraordinarily high quality. Evidently, the Ethiopian emperors were quite keen to keep European travellers away from Ennarea, since they feared for their gold monopoly.

Concerning horticulture, the Ennareans, like the other Gonga people, cultivated the ensete, or “false banana plant”. It was not only consumed but also used to make toys and clothes. Beside the ensete all the Gonga people grew various potato species, black yams and teff. Pumpkins are recorded to have been introduced by the Oromo.

== Religion ==
=== Christianity ===
It remains unknown when and how Christianity took roots in Ennarea. Christian influence can be assumed since the 9th century, with the priest-accompanied expedition of Digna-Jan. In the later 14th century a Christian missionary was said to have been sent to Ennarea. However, it was only in the early 16th when a Christian community was actually recorded to have thrived inside the kingdom.

During the reign of king La’Ashohni (c. 1570–1580), who was recorded to have "loved the Christian religion", a request for baptism was sent to the imperial court, which was, however, rejected, since Christian subjects had to pay considerably less tribute than Pagan ones. The request was repeated by his son Badancho. This time the emperor accepted the request (though mostly to have a Christian buffer state against the invading Oromo forces). After conversion, Badancho attempted to spread Christianity among his subjects not only by building many churches, but also by offering precious gifts to every single convert. Expectedly, a high number of people converted, but this golden age of Christianity was only for a short period: only some decades later, during the reign of emperor Susenyos, it was recorded that Ennarean Christianity had “very much declined". To counter that fact Susenyos, who was a Catholic, sent a large number of priests to Ennarea. Perhaps it was under him when Catholicism was introduced in the region. King Emana Krestos (r. c. 1630–1640) was recorded to be a "very good Catholic", but it remains unclear if the succeeding Ennarean monarchs were Catholic or Orthodox. What seems clear, however, is the fact that only the nobility remained Christian in general, with their religion functioning as a kind of elite status, while the common people stuck to Paganism. Ennarea probably played the role of a filter of Christian influences from the north upon the other Gonga people, especially Kaffa and Seka.

=== Islam ===
Islam was probably only of limited relevance in the region before 1710, although Muslims were mentioned to have lived in Ennarea at the time of king Benero.

== Kings ==
Chronology based on Werner Lange's "The History of the Southern Gonga (southwestern Ethiopia)":

=== Hinnare-tatos of Ennarea ===
Name	Date of reign	Notes
Kaba Siyon	c. 1450–1530	First known king.
Shipinihi	Mid 16th century	Infamous ruler, perhaps of Portuguese descent.
La’Ashohni	c. 1570–1580	–
Badancho	c. 1580–1603	Converted to Christianity.
Jacob?	1603–1605	Exiled Solomonic prince, role in Ennarea unknown.
Benero	c. 1605–1619	Killed in a revolt.
Sysgayo	c. 1619–1630	–
Emana Krestos	c. 1630–1640	–
Gumicho	c. 1640–1645	–
Techotchi	Mid-17th century	–
Gamma Kegotchi	Mid-17th century	Member of the royal clan of Kaffa, probably brother of Gah Nechotchi and Gawo Serotchi.
Gah Nechotchi	Mid-17th century	Member of the royal clan of Kaffa, probably brother of Gamma Kegotchi and Gawo Serotchi.
Gawo Serotchi	Late 17th century	Member of the royal clan of Kaffa, probably brother of Gamma Kegotchi and Gah Nechotchi.
Tumi Takotchi	Early 18th century	–
Tumi Goetchi	Early 18th century	–
Shisafotchi	Early 18th century	Last Ennarean king north of the Gojeb, initiated the exodus into Kaffa.

=== Hinnare-tatos in exile ===
Name	Date of reign
Saco Nechotchi	Mid-18th century
Takla Sachi	Late 18th century
Garginotchi	Early 19th century
Sage Nechotchi	Mid-19th century
Cetchi Nechotchi	Late 19th century
