= Gilgel Gibe II Power Station =

Power station in Ethiopia

- Country: Ethiopia
- Location: 80 km (50 mi) east of Jimma, Oromia Region
- Coordinates: 7°45′25″N 37°33′44″E
- Status: Operational
- Commission date: January 14, 2010; 16 years ago
- Owner: Ethiopian Electric Power

Thermal power station
- Turbine technology: Hydroelectric

Power generation
- Units operational: 4 x Pelton-type
- Nameplate capacity: 420 MW
- Annual net output: 1635 GWh Est.

The Gilgel Gibe II Power Station is a hydroelectric power station on the Omo River in Ethiopia. It is located about 80 km (50 mi) east of Jimma in Oromia Region. The power station receives water from a tunnel entrance 7°55′27″N 37°23′16″E on the Gilgel Gibe River. It has an installed capacity of 420 MW and was inaugurated on January 14, 2010. Almost two weeks after inauguration, a portion of the head race tunnel collapsed, causing the station to shut down. Repairs were completed on December 26, 2010.

== Design ==
The Gilgel Gibe II consists of a power station on the Omo River that is fed with water from a headrace tunnel and sluice gate on the Gilgel Gibe River. The headrace tunnel runs 26 km (16 mi) under the Fofa Mountain and at its end, it converts into a penstock with a 500 m (1,600 ft) drop. When the water reaches the power station, it powers four Pelton turbines that operate four 107 MW generators. Each turbine is 3.5 m (11 ft) in diameter.

== Construction ==
Construction on the power plant began on March 19, 2005, with Salini Costruttori as the main contractor. The power station was originally slated to be completed in late 2007 but was delayed because of engineering problems during construction. In March 2005, the contract to excavate the tunnel was awarded to SELI and in October 2006, a tunnel boring machine (TBM) hit a fault, delaying the project. On June 9, 2009, both TBMs met each other and the tunnel was ready for hydraulic testing that September. The tunnel is "considered one of the most difficult tunnel projects ever undertaken, due to the critical, and in some reaches, exceptionally adverse, ground conditions." The power station was inaugurated on January 14, 2010.

=== Tunnel collapse and repair ===
About ten days after the project was completed, about 15 m (49 ft) of the 26 km (16 mi) headrace tunnel collapsed. The collapse may have been attributed to structural failure caused by expedited construction and a lack of proper studies. The official statement of the construction firm Salini Costruttori, released two weeks after the official inauguration was that "an unforeseen geological event provoked a 'cave in' and a huge rock fall involving about 15m of the 26km headrace tunnel." The tunnel was repaired and the station operational again on December 26, 2010.

== Financing ==
In 2004, the Government of Ethiopia secured €220 million from the Government of Italy for construction. The total cost of construction is €373 million with €50 million provided by the European Investment Bank, and the remaining €103 million from the Ethiopian Government.

== Controversy ==
The financing of the power plant was controversial within the Italian government. It was granted despite objections raised by the Directorate General for Development Cooperation of the Ministry of Foreign Affairs and the Ministry of Economy and Finance. They argued against the loan because the contract was awarded without competitive bidding in breach of Italian law, because its unusually large size meant that less funding was available for other development projects, no costs for environmental impact assessment of monitoring were included, the project was not commercially viable due to low electricity tariffs in Ethiopia and because it was inappropriate to burden such a poor country with more debt at a time when it had just received debt relief from Italy. There were also parliamentary questions concerning the project which were left unanswered by the Undersecretary of State for Foreign Affairs, Luigi Mantica. In March 2006 the Prosecutors’ Office in Rome instigated criminal proceedings concerning the Gilgel Gibe II hydroelectric project.

== See also ==
- Energy in Ethiopia
