= Kingdom of Limmu-Ennarea =

1801–1891 Oromo kingdom in southern Ethiopia

- 1801–1891
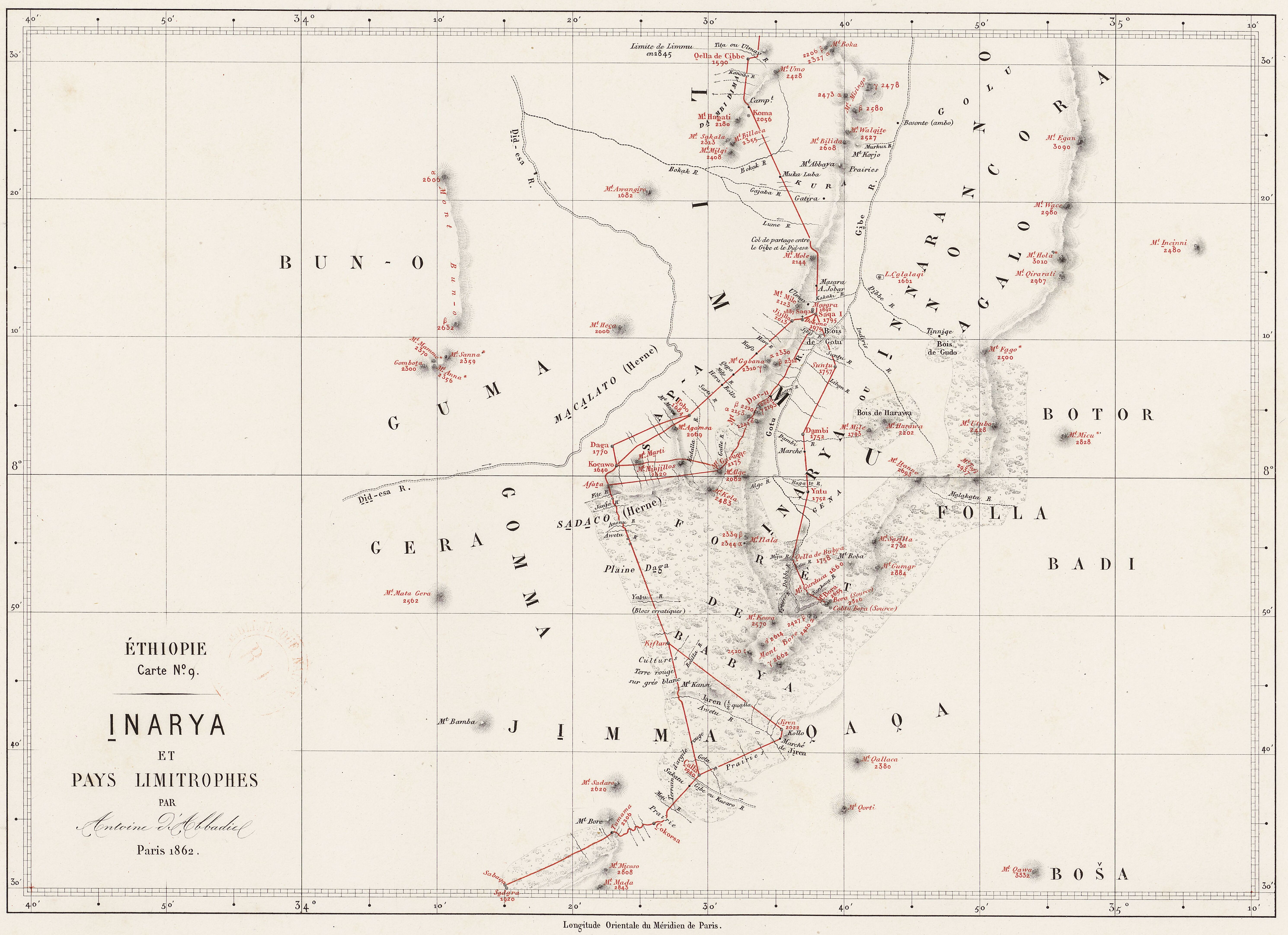
- Ennerea and neighboring countries by Antoine d'Abbadie (1862)
- Capital: Saqqa
- Religion: Sunni Islam
- Government: Monarchy
- History
  - Established: 1801
  - Annexed by Ethiopian Empire: 1891
Preceded by	Succeeded by
Ennarea	Ethiopian Empire
- Today part of: Ethiopia

The Kingdom of Limmu-Ennarea was one of the kingdoms in the Gibe region of Ethiopia that emerged in the 19th century. It shared its eastern border with the Kingdom of Jimma, its southern border with the Kingdom of Gomma and its western border with the Kingdom of Gumma. Beyond its northern border lay tribes of the Macha Oromo. Jimma was considered the most civilized of the Gibe kingdoms, which had a population in the 1880s between 10,000 and 12,000. It was converted to Islam by missionaries from Emirate of Harar in the first half of the 19th century; C.T. Beke, writing in 1841, reported that its "king and most of his subjects are Mohammedan." Limmu-Ennarea's capital was at Saqqa.

The location of this former kingdom has a north to south central elevation between 1,500 and over 2,000 metres (5,000 to over 6,500 feet), and is covered with forests. The population of this kingdom was estimated in 1880 to have been about 40,000, including slaves. However, this was after an epidemic of plague in the late 1840s, and Mordechai Abir estimates the population before that calamity to have been around 100,000.

== History ==
The kingdom of Limmu-Ennarea was a continuation of the older kingdom of Ennarea, which for many decades successfully resisted the Oromo, who had overrun other kingdoms tributary to the Ethiopian Emperor including Bizamo and Konch. Despite this, as Mohammed Hassen observes, Ennarea eventually drifted into an extended period of civil war and by "the middle of the second half of the seventeenth century, Ennarya not only lacked a single leadership, but also her feuding leaders probably fought more with each other than with their common enemy." In 1704, when Emperor Iyasu the Great campaigned south of the Abay River, and reached Gonga, the stronghold of Ennarea on the Gibe River, he was met by two rival leaders of the crumbling kingdom. In the years following the Emperor's expedition to Ennarea, the warring potentates gradually fled south to the Kingdom of Kaffa. The remaining Sidamo population was absorbed by the Oromo, who as a practice made no distinction in ethnic ancestry for inclusion into their society.

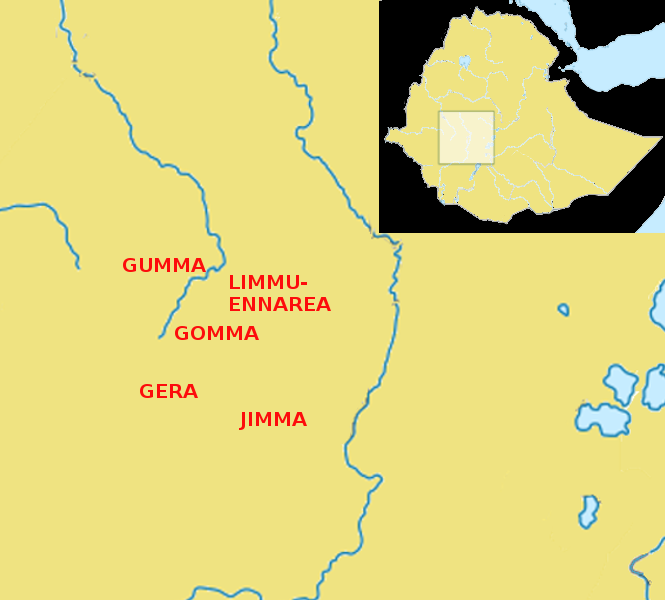
The five Oromo kingdoms of the Gibe region

Eventually a powerful war leader, Bofo the son of Boku, came to dominate the Limmu Oromo by his military prowess and charisma; Mohammed Hassen dates this development between 1800 and 1802. He formed a dynastic bond with the daughter of Abba Rebu, who traced his ancestry to both the earlier dynasty that ruled Ennarea, as well as a Portuguese soldier from Cristóvão da Gama's army who had come to live in Ennarea. Abir also notes that another tradition states that this marriage was a political union between two rival clans, the Sapera and the Sigaro. In either case, due to this Portuguese influence, the kings of Limmu-Ennarea called themselves supera, unlike the other Gibe kings who used the Oromo word "Moti" which originally indicated the office of the war leader (also called Abba Dula) during the cycle of his Gadaa.

In 1825, Bofu abdicated in favor of his son, Abba Bagibo, under whose rule Limmu-Ennarea reached the peak of its existence. Due to wars in neighboring Jimmu, merchants used the trade route through his kingdom to gain access to Kaffa. Abba Bagibo made a concerted effort to promote this trade, both with beneficial policies (e.g., offering security from bandits to traders, and lower tariffs) and with coercive ones (requiring merchants from Gondar, Adwa, Derita and Dawe to meet their counterparts from Kaffa and further south at Saqqa).

During Abba Bagibo's reign, the Kingdom of Limmu-Ennarea adopted Islam as the state religion. When Catholic missionaries later opened a mission in the kingdom in 1846, the king told them that "had you come thirty years ago, not only I but all my countrymen might have embraced your religion, but now it is impossible." In this time period, Harari traders from the Emirate of Harar would frequently visit the kingdom.

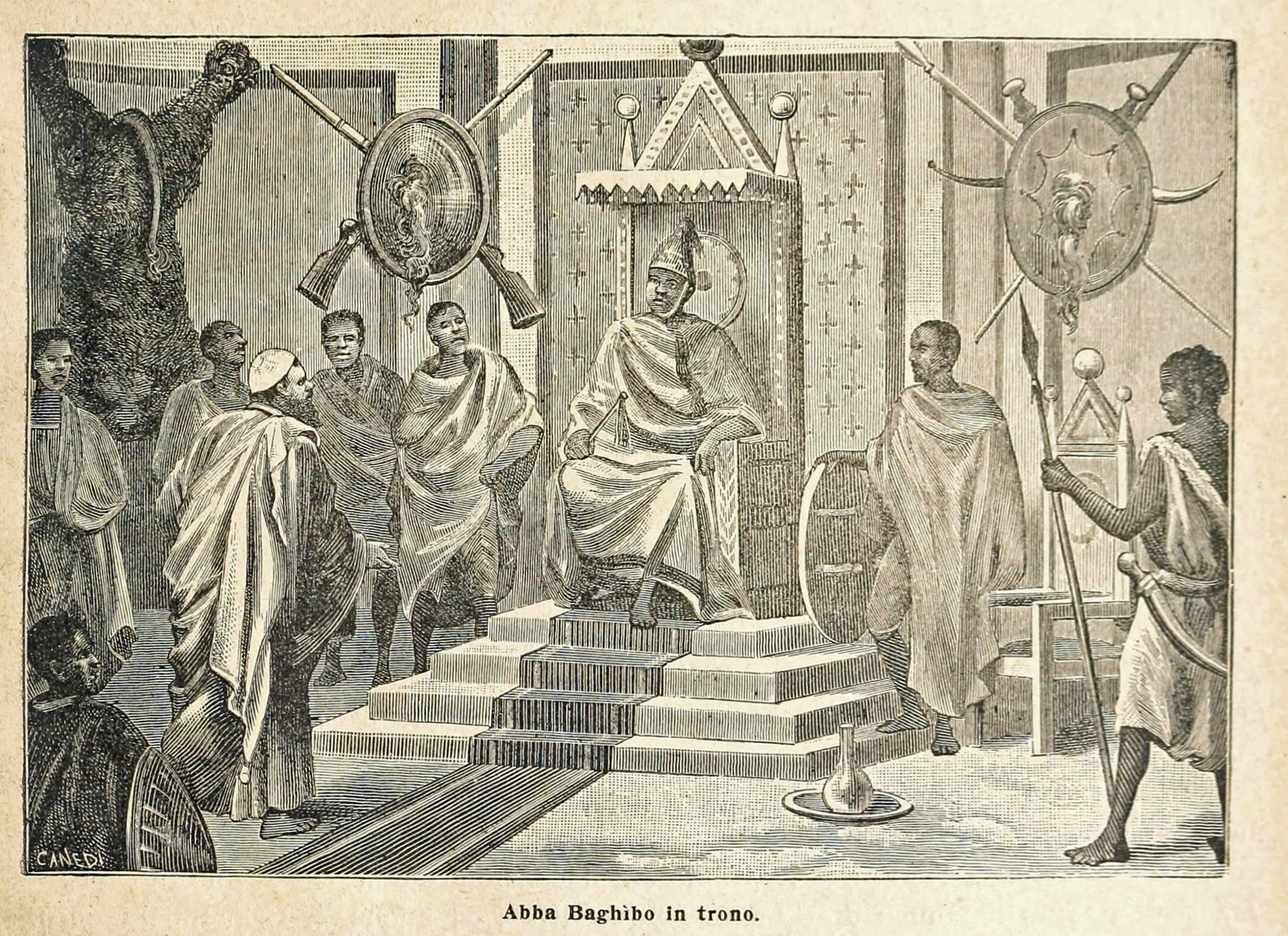
Sultan Abba Bagibo

Jimma's eventual success at conquering the Badi-Folla in 1847 reopened the trade route between Kaffa and Shewa, which merchants found to be a much better route. This also brought an end to Limmu-Ennarea prosperity, despite Abba Bagido's later actions. On his death in 1861, Abba Bagido was succeeded by his "untalented and fanatic Muslim son", who hastened the kingdom's decline.

Limmu-Ennarea was secured for Shewa by Ras Gobana Dacche following the decisive Battle of Embabo, without a single blow being struck; however, when Ras Gobana fell from power a few years later in the mid-1880s, the entire Gibe region erupted in revolt. Dejazmach Wolde Giyorgis then re-conquered the kingdom by force; the Dejazmach afterwards built a church dedicated to St Marqos near the royal palace. Abba Bagibo, the son of the last king, Abba Gomoli, converted to Christianity for political advantages, changed his name to Gabra Selassie, and became a Fitawrari in the Ethiopian Empire.

== Veneration ==
According to Enrico Cerulli, the founder of Harar, Arab saint Abadir is venerated in Limmu-Ennarea.

== See also ==
- Rulers of the Gibe State of Limu-'Enarya
