= Mount Maigudo =

Mountain in Ethiopia

- Location within Ethiopia

Highest point
- Elevation: 3,361 m (11,027 ft)
- Prominence: 1,591 m (5,220 ft)
- Isolation: 116.69 km (72.51 mi)
- Listing: Ultra; Ribu
- Coordinates: 7°29′29″N 37°12′22″E

Geography
- Country: Ethiopia
- State: Oromia
- Parent range: Central Ethiopian Highlands

Mount Maigudo is a mountain located in Oromia, Ethiopia. Maigudo is an Ultra-prominent peak and is the 62nd highest in Africa. It has an elevation of 3,361 m (11,027 ft).

== See also ==
List of ultras of Africa
