= Omo River =

River in southwestern Ethiopia

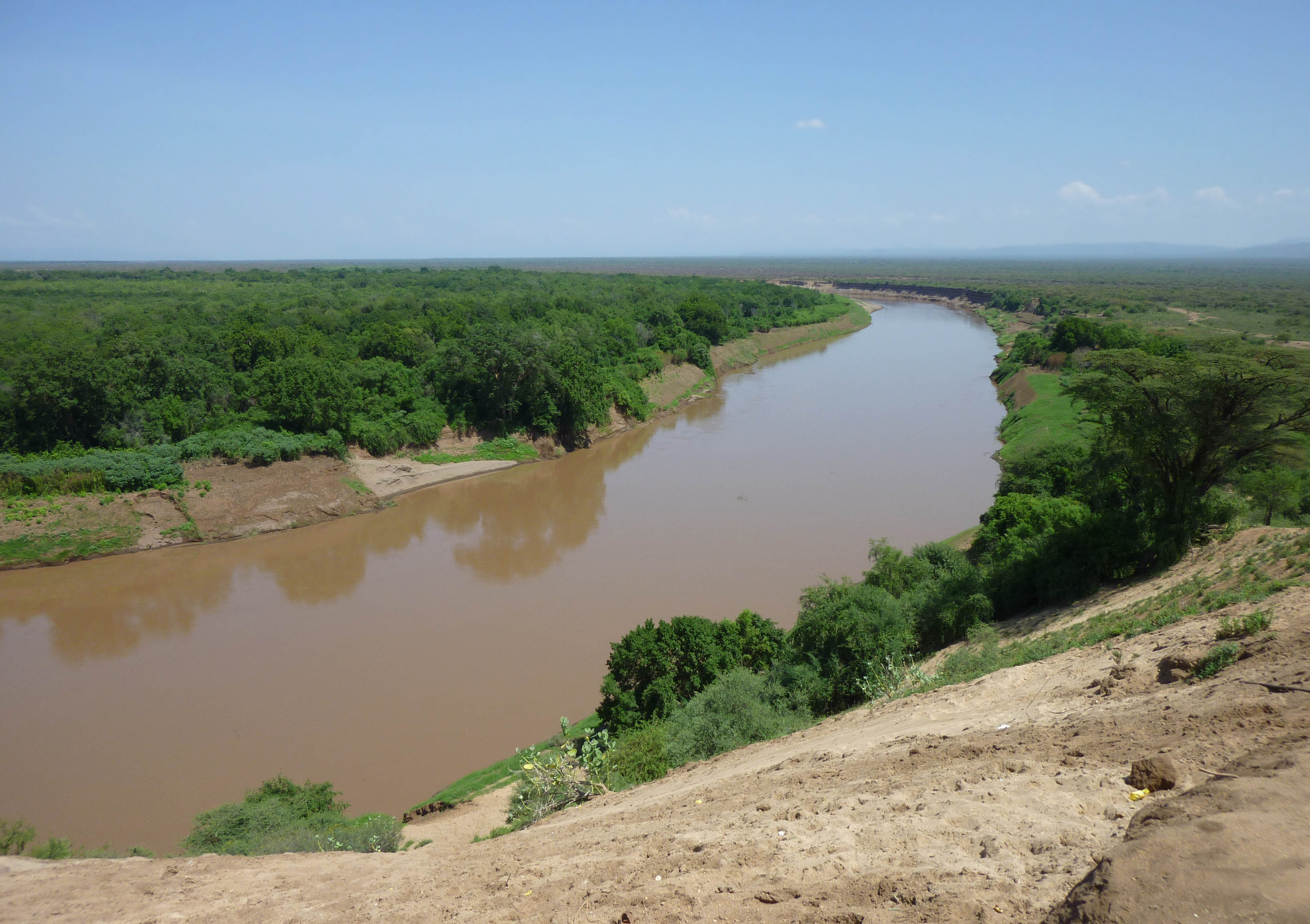
- Omo River near Omorati

Location
- Country: Ethiopia
- Regions: South Ethiopia Regional State, Oromia

Physical characteristics
- Source: Ethiopian Highlands
  - coordinates: 7°48′43″N 36°53′56″E
  - elevation: 2,281 m (7,484 ft)
- Mouth: Lake Turkana
  - coordinates: 4°29′48.8″N 36°0′49.7″E
  - elevation: 388 m (1,273 ft)
- Length: 1,104 km (686 mi)
- Basin size: 86,657 km^{2} (33,459 sq mi)
- Discharge
  - location: Mouth
  - average: 915.5 m^{3}/s (32,330 cu ft/s)
  - minimum: 164.6 m^{3}/s (5,814 cu ft/s)
  - maximum: 2,295 m^{3}/s (81,030 cu ft/s)

Basin features
- River system: Omo Basin
- Population: 15,500,000
- Tributaries
  - left: Gibe, Usno, Wabe
  - right: Gojeb, Denchya, Mui, Mantsa, Zigina

Lower Valley of the Omo
UNESCO World Heritage Site
- Location within Ethiopia
- Location: Ethiopia
- Criteria: Cultural: (iii)(iv)
- Reference: 17
- Inscription: 1980 (4th Session)
- Coordinates: 4°48′N 35°58′E

The Omo River (Amharic: ኦሞ ወንዝ, romanized: Omo Wenz; also called Omo-Bottego) in southern Ethiopia is the largest Ethiopian river outside the Nile Basin. Its course is entirely contained within the boundaries of Ethiopia, and it empties into Lake Turkana on the border with Kenya. The river is the principal stream of an endorheic drainage basin, the Turkana Basin.

The river basin is famous for its large number of early hominid fossils and archeological findings such as early stone tools, leading to its inclusion on the UNESCO World Heritage List in 1980.

== Geography ==
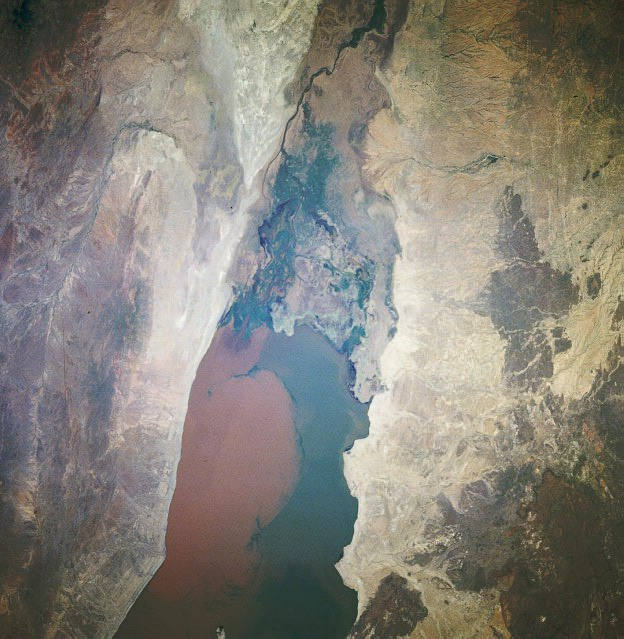
Omo River Delta

The Omo River forms through the confluence of the Gibe River, by far the largest total tributary of the Omo River, and the Gojeb River, a large right-bank tributary of the Omo. Given their sizes, lengths and courses one might consider both the Omo and the Gibe rivers to be one and the same river but with different names. Consequently, the whole river basin is sometimes called the Omo-Gibe River Basin. This river basin includes part of the western Oromia Region and the middle of the Southern Nations, Nationalities, and People's Region.

Its course is generally to the south, however with a major bend to the west at about 7° N 37° 30' E to about 36° E where it turns south until 5° 30' N where it makes a large S-bend then resumes its southerly course to Lake Turkana. According to materials published by the Ethiopian Central Statistical Agency, the Omo-Bottego River is 760 kilometres (470 mi) long.

In its course the Omo-Bottego has a total fall of about 700 metres (2,300 ft) from the confluence of the Gibe and Wabe rivers at 1,060 metres (3,480 ft) to 360 metres (1,180 ft) at lake-level, and is consequently a rapid stream in its upper reaches, being broken by the Kokobi and other falls, and navigable only for a short distance above where it empties into Lake Turkana, one of the lakes of the Gregory Rift. The Spectrum Guide to Ethiopia describes it as a popular site for white-water rafting in September and October, when the river is still high from the rainy season. Its most important tributary is the Gibe River; smaller tributaries include the Wabi, Denchya, Gojeb, Mui and Usno rivers.

The Omo-Bottego River formed the eastern boundaries for the former kingdoms of Janjero, and Garo. The Omo also flows past the Mago and Omo National Parks, which are known for their wildlife. Many animals live near and on the river, including hippopotamuses, crocodiles and puff adders.

== Archaeological findings ==
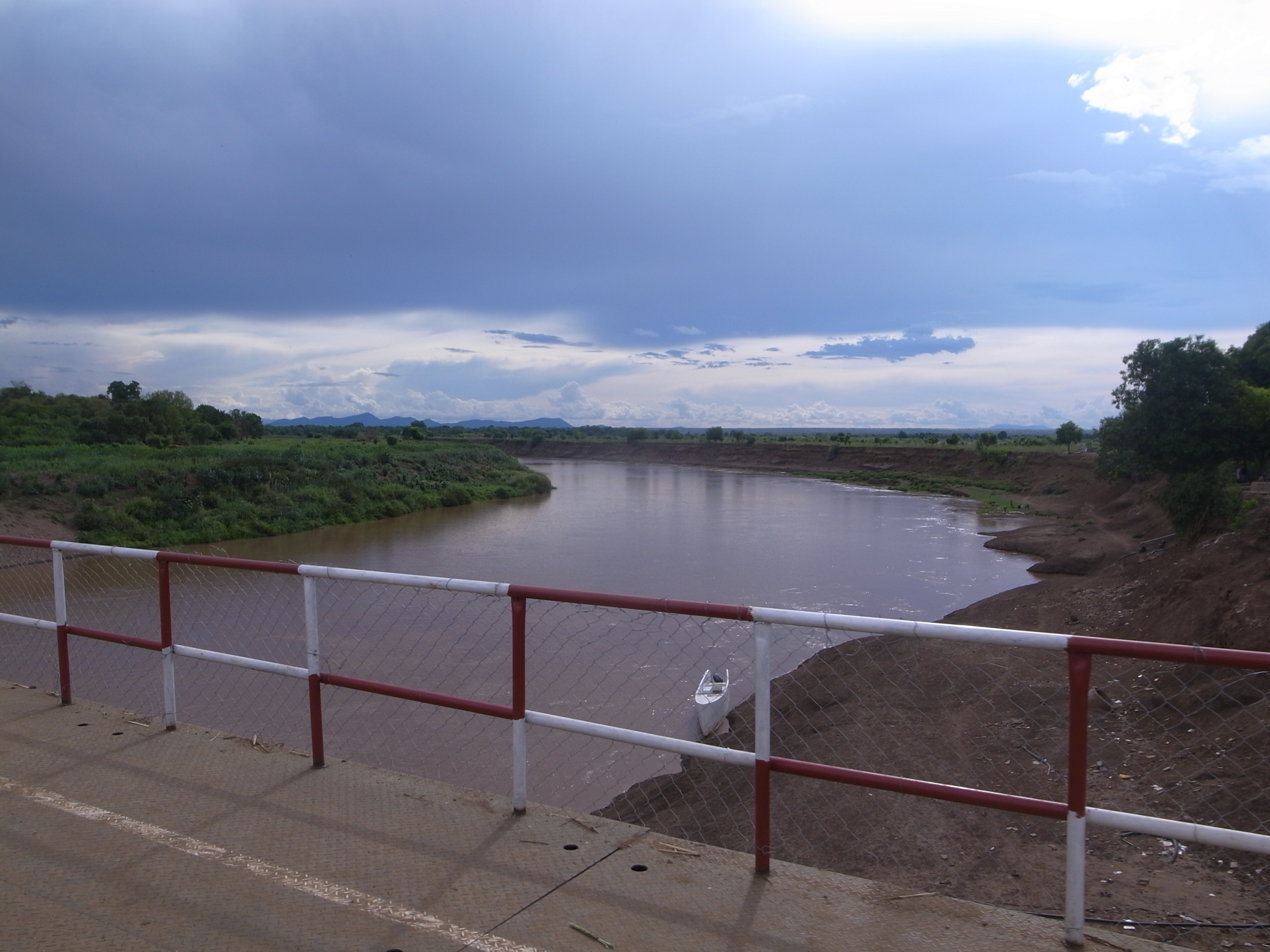
Omo river crossing

The entire Omo river basin is also important geologically and archaeologically. Over 50,000 fossils have been identified from the lower valley, including 230 hominid fossils dating to the Pliocene and Pleistocene. Fossils belonging to the genera Australopithecus and Homo have been found at several archaeological sites, as well as tools made from quartzite, the oldest of which date back to about 2.4 million years ago. When they were discovered, it was thought that the tools might have been part of a so-called pre-Oldowan industry, even more primitive than what was found in the Olduvai Gorge. Later research has shown that the crude looks of the tools were in fact caused by very poor raw materials, and that the techniques used and the shapes permit their inclusion in the Oldowan.

The first archaeological discoveries in the area were in 1901, by a French expedition. The most significant finds were made later, between 1967 and 1975, by an international archaeological team. This team located a number of different items, including the jawbone of an Australopithecus man, estimated at some 2.5 million years old. Archeologists have also found fossil fragments of Olduwan hominids from the early Pleistocene era and up to the Pliocene era. Quartz tools have been located with some of the later Homo sapiens remains found on the riverbanks. Since then, the excavations have been carried out by a joint French and American team.

In addition to early hominid fossils, a diversity of mammal and fish fossils have been found within the Omo Valley.

== Human impact ==
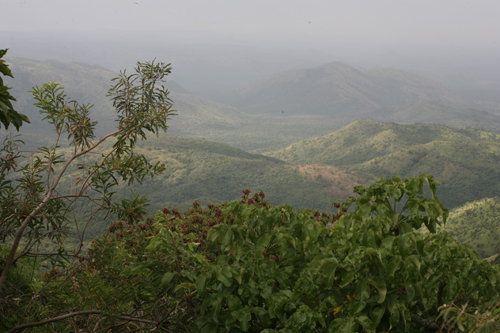
Omo River Valley

The lower valley of the Omo is currently believed by some to have been a crossroads for thousands of years as various cultures and ethnic groups migrated around the region, with a large array of hominid fossils. To this day, the people of the Lower Valley of the Omo, including the Mursi, Suri, Nyangatom, Dizi and Me'en, are studied for their diversity.

Italian explorer Vittorio Bottego first reached the Omo river on 29 June 1896 during his second African expedition (1895–97), dying during this expedition on 17 March 1897. The Omo river was renamed Omo-Bottego in his honour. Herbert Henry Austin and his men reached the Omo delta on 12 September 1898, and found that an Ethiopian expedition, led by Ras Wolda Giyorgis, had previously planted Ethiopian flags on the northern shore of Lake Turkana on 7 April. Lieutenant Alexander Bulatovich led a second Ethiopian expedition which reached the lake August 21, 1899, and was equally destructive. Despite this, the Frenchmen in the party accurately mapped for the first time many of the meanders of the Omo River delta. This rendition of the Omo River remained in use until the 1930s when Italian colonial cartographers made a new and more accurate rendition of the river and its delta.

== Hydroelectric power stations ==
There are several power stations and dams in the Omo River basin which are named after the Gilgel Gibe River and Gibe River, which are tributaries of the Omo River. Despite the somewhat confusing naming they are native power stations and dams located on the Omo River.

=== Gilgel Gibe II Power Station ===
The Gilgel Gibe II Power Station 7.756492664604506°N 37.56255950100352°E is a hydroelectric power station on the Omo River with a power output of 420 Megawatt (MW). The power station receives water from a tunnel entrance 7°55′27″N 37°23′16″E on the Gilgel Gibe River in a run-of-river scheme. The tunnel entrance is sitting downstream of the Gilgel Gibe I Dam also on the Gilgel Gibe River with which it forms a hydroelectric cascade.

=== Gibe III dam ===
The Gibe III Hydroelectric dam is a 246 metres (807 ft) high roller-compacted concrete dam with an associated hydropower plant on the Omo River in Ethiopia. It is the largest hydropower plant in Ethiopia with a power output of about 1870 Megawatt (MW), thus more than doubling total installed capacity in Ethiopia from its 2007 level of 814 MW. A controversy has ensued over its construction, with several NGOs forming a campaign to oppose it. According to Terri Hathaway, director of International Rivers' Africa programme, Gibe III is "the most destructive dam under construction in Africa." The project would condemn "half a million of the region's most vulnerable people to hunger and conflict." A group of international campaigners launched an online petition against Ethiopia's dam project over human rights concerns.

However, Azeb Asnake, project manager of Gibe III for the government power provider, said that a mitigation measure has been prepared in case something happens. Apart from this, Asnake predicted no adverse consequence from the project, adding that more than half of the people that live in the area are dependent on food aid and that the new station is necessary as currently the corporation is only supplying power for 25 per cent of the population.

== 2006 floods ==
Heavy rains in 2006 caused the Omo to flood its lower course, drowning at least 456 people and stranding over 20,000 people over the space of five days ending 16 August. While seasonal heavy rains are normal for this part of the country, overgrazing and deforestation are blamed for this tragedy. "The rivers in Ethiopia have less capacity to hold as much water as they did years before, because they are being filled up with silt," World Food Programme spokeswoman Paulette Jones said. "It takes less intensity of rainfall ... to make a river in any particular part of the country overflow." The seasonal flooding of the Omo River is vital to the indigenous groups that live along it. The flood brings fertile silt and inundates the banks with water, making river bank cultivation possible. The diverse peoples along the lower Omo—which include the Turkana, Dassanach, Hamer, Nyangatom, Karo, Kwegu, Mursi, Bodi, and Me'en—derive a great portion of their food supply from flood retreat cultivation.

The large and destructive flood of 2006 is the only one that has occurred within the past fifty years. The recent drop in the level of Lake Turkana, which is generally recognized to receive about ninety percent of its waters from the Omo River's inflow, has already caused a rise in salinity level.

== See also ==
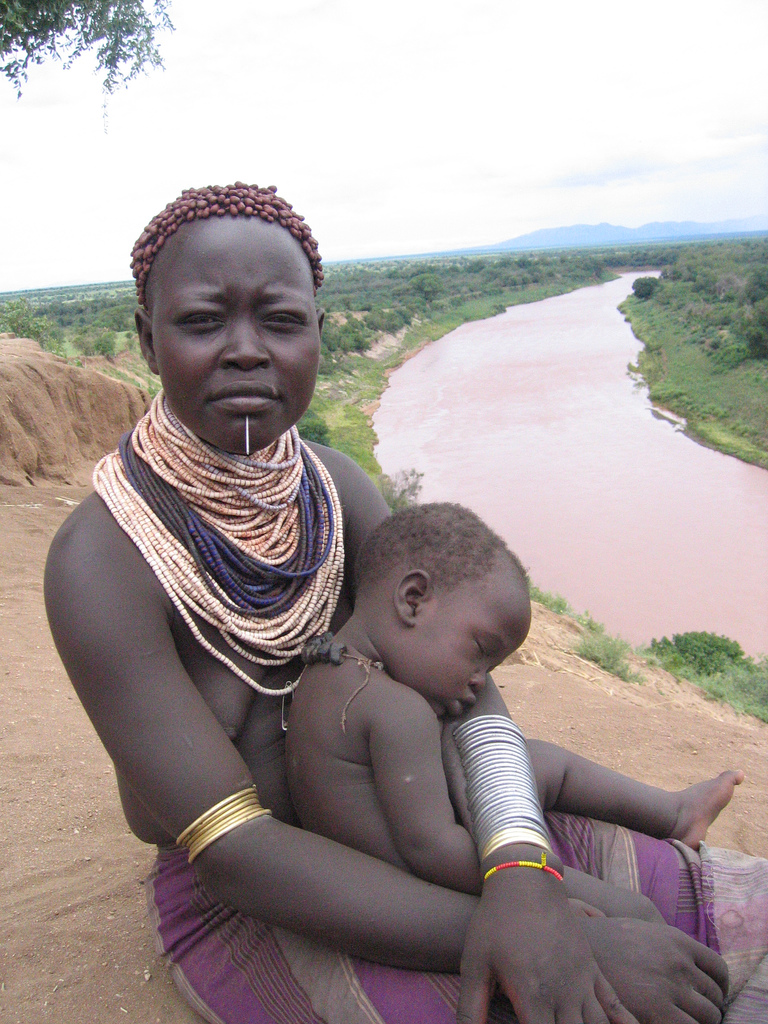
Karo woman and child near Omo River

- Gibe River
- List of Ethiopian rivers
- List of fossil sites (with link directory)
- Omo Kibish Formation
- Omo Remains
- List of World Heritage Sites in Ethiopia
