= Gilgel Gibe River =

Major tributary river in southwestern Ethiopia

Coordinates: 8.257°N 37.486°E

Gilgel Gibe River (with Gilgel meaning Little) is a major tributary of the larger Gibe River in southwest Ethiopia in western Oromia Region. It flows in an arc through the south of the Jimma Zone, defining part of the Zone's boundary with that of the Southern Nations, Nationalities, and Peoples' Region as it turns north. It then joins the eastwards flowing Gibe River less than ten miles from its own confluence with the Omo River.

== Hydroelectric potential ==
Plans to develop the hydroelectric potential of the Gilgel Gibe river were first announced in the 1980s.

Construction of the Gilgel Gibe I Power Station started in 1986 and was completed in 2004, after being interrupted in the early 1990s. The plant includes a reservoir of about 0.917 cubic kilometers created by a dam about 40 meters high. The Gilgel Gibe river flows are returned to the natural river bed after having transformed the energy of the water into electricity through a powerplant equipped with three Francis turbines.

The resettlement program required moving about 3,000 people to new areas including the people living under or near the power line connecting the power plant to Addis Ababa. Employing 307 expatriates from 32 countries and 4,015 local people, the plant was completed at a cost of about two billion birr and became Ethiopia's largest power plant at that time, with a capacity of 184 megawatts.

The second phase of the development of the Gibe-Omo hydropower potential started with the Gilgel Gibe II Power Station on the Omo River. The flows of the Gilgel Gibe River, regulated by the Gilgel Gibe I Dam, are conveyed through a 26 km long hydraulic tunnel through the Fofa mountains to the Omo River in the neighboring river valley downstream of the Gilgel Gibe I. The plant, that produces about 420 MW did not require resettlements. This second phase was 97.5% complete in August 2009 and was scheduled for commissioning in September 2009 onwards.
