= Yemsa language =

Omotic language spoken in Ethiopia

Yem
- Yemsa
- Native to: Ethiopia
- Region: Oromia Region & Central Ethiopia
- Native speakers: 92,000 (2007 census)
- Language family: Afro-Asiatic: Omotic; North; Yem
- Dialects: Fuga
- Writing system: Ethiopic, Latin

Language codes
- ISO 639-3: jnj
- Glottolog: yems1235
- ELP: Yem

Yemsa is the language of the Yem people of the former Kingdom of Yamma, known as the Kingdom of Janjero traditionally. It is a member of the Omotic group of languages, most closely related to Kafa. It is distinctive in having different systems of vocabulary depending on social status, rather like Japanese and Javanese. The estimated number of speakers varies wildly from about 1000 (Bender, 1976) to half a million (Aklilu, 1993). The ISO 639-3 system for assigning standardized codes to languages has faced criticism for perpetuating the use of the term Janjero despite its prejudicial origin; the Yem language is coded as jnj as opposed to a mnemonic derived from the preferred name of the language.

Yemsa is the main language spoken in Yem special woreda, Central Ethiopia.

The Fuga dialect is distinct enough to perhaps be a different language.

== Sample verb forms ==
- zagín - I do
- zaginí - we do
- zagít - you (singular) do
- zagí - he does
- zagì - she does
