= Yem people =

Ethnic group in Ethiopia

- Traditional Yem colors

Total population
- 160,447 (2007)

Regions with significant populations
- south-western Ethiopia

Languages
- Amharic, Yemsa

Religion
- Traditional African religions, Ethiopian Orthodox Christianity, Sunni Islam

Related ethnic groups
- Kafficho, Tembaro

The Yem are an ethnic group living in south-western Ethiopia. Their native language is Yemsa, one of the Omotic languages, although many also speak Amharic. The neighbors of the Yem include the Gurage, Hadya, and Kembata to the east across the Omo River and the Jimma Oromo to the south, north and west.

== History ==
The first reference to Yem as a political unit is found, under the name of Jangero, in the victory song of King Yeshaq I (1412-1427) of the Christian kingdom of Ethiopia, as paying tribute in the form of horses to the king. The first European traveler to mention Yem was the European traveler Father Fernandez, who travelled through their homeland in 1614.

== Population ==
Their number was not definitely known until recently, as Aklilu Yilma states, "Bender gives the estimate as '1000' (Bender 1976: 4), whereas the Ethnologue reported 1,000 to 4,000 Yemsa speakers in 1992. The report of the Central Statistical Office gives the 1984 census figures of the Yem people as 34,951 (Central Statistical Office 1991:61), but this census seems to comprise only the Fofa area." The 1994 national census reported 60,811 people identified themselves as Yem in the Southern Nations, Nationalities, and People's Region (SNNPR), of whom 59,581 lived in the around Fofa, and 52,292 speakers of the Yemsa language in the SNNPR, of whom 51,264 were living in the same area.Now the administration city is saja. The more recent 2007 national census reports that 160,447 were identified as Yem, of whom 84,607 lived in the Oromia Region and 74,906 in the SNNPR.

== See also ==
- Yem special woreda
- Kingdom of Janjero
