= Jimma Zone =

Zone in Oromia Region of Ethiopia

Coordinates: 7°45′N 37°00′E

Map of the regions and zones of Ethiopia

Jimma is a zone in Oromia Region of Ethiopia. Jimma is named after former Kingdom of Jimma, which was absorbed into the former province of jimma in 1932. Jimma is bordered on the south by the Southern Nations, Nationalities and Peoples Region, the northwest by Illubabor Zone, on the north by East Welega Zone and on the northeast by West Shewa Zone; part of the boundary with West Shewa Zone is defined by the Gibe River. The highest point in this zone is Mount Maigudo (2,386 m). Towns and cities in Jimma include Agaro, Limmu Inariya and Saqqa. The town of Jimma was separated from Jimma Zone and is a special zone now.

The Central Statistical Agency (CSA) reported that 26,743 tons of coffee were produced in this zone in the year ending in 2005, based on inspection records from the Ethiopian Coffee and Tea authority. This represents 23.2% of the Region's output and 11.8% of Ethiopia's total output, and makes Jimma one of the three top producers of these goods, along with the Sidama and Gedeo Zones.

Historically, Jimma has been considered one of the food-exporting areas of Ethiopia, but beginning in 1997 poor crops harvests and the appearance of crop diseases such as Grey leaf spot, caused by the fungus Cercospora zeaemaydis (not previously common in Ethiopia) led to a deterioration in conditions. By 1999, signs of the seriousness of the situation included empty household granaries, people begging and committing crimes in the hope they will be fed in jail, sending children to live with relatives or friends, and reduced student enrollment in schools.

== Demographics ==
Based on the 2007 Census conducted by the CSA, this Zone has a total population of 3,486,155, an increase of 26.76% over the 1994 census, of whom 1,750,527 are men and 1,735,628 women; with an area of 15,568.58 square kilometers, Jimma has a population density of 159.69. While 137,668 or 11.31% are urban inhabitants, a further 858 or 0.03% are pastoralists. A total of 521,506 households were counted in this Zone, which results in an average of 4.77 persons to a household, and 500,374 housing units. The three largest ethnic groups reported in Jimma were the Oromo (89.6%), the Amhara (3.05%) and the Yem (2.12%); all other ethnic groups made up 5.23% of the population. Oromo was spoken as a first language by 90.43% and 5.33% spoke Amharic; the remaining 4.24% spoke all other primary languages reported. The majority of the inhabitants were Muslim, with 85.65% of the population having reported they practiced that belief, while 11.18% of the population practiced Ethiopian Orthodox Christianity and 2.97% professed Protestantism.

The 1994 national census reported a total population for this Zone of 1,961,262 in 432,101 households, of whom 979,708 were men and 981,554 women; 190,395 or 9.71% of its population were urban dwellers at the time. The five largest ethnic groups reported in Jimma were the Oromo (81.57%), the Yem (5.28%), the Amhara (4.95%), the Kullo (2.9%), and the Kafficho (1.78%); all other ethnic groups made up 3.52% of the population. (Based on research performed in the early 1990s, as many as 500,000 inhabitants may be members of the Yem.) Oromo was spoken as a first language by 85.96%, 7.86% Amharic, 1.95% spoke Kullo, 1.45% spoke Yemsa, and 1.19% spoke Kafa; the remaining 1.59% spoke all other primary languages reported. The majority of the inhabitants were Muslim, with 82.57% of the population having reported they practiced that belief, while 15.78% of the population said they professed Ethiopian Orthodox Christianity, and 1.47% were Protestant.

According to a May 24, 2004 World Bank memorandum, 9% of the inhabitants of Jimma have access to electricity, this zone has a road density of 77.0 kilometers per 1000 square kilometers (compared to the national average of 30 kilometers), the average rural household has 0.9 hectare of land (compared to the national average of 1.01 hectare of land and an average of 1.14 for the Oromia) and the equivalent of 0.5 heads of livestock. 15.1% of the population is in non-farm related jobs, compared to the national average of 25% and a Regional average of 24%. Concerning education, 57% of all eligible children are enrolled in primary school, and 12% in secondary schools. Concerning health, 29% of the zone is exposed to malaria, and 63% to Tsetse fly. The memorandum gave this zone a drought risk rating of 298.
