= Lists of rulers of Ghana =

This is a list of rulers and office-holders of Ghana.

== Heads of state ==
- List of heads of state of Ghana

== Colonial governors ==
- List of governors-general of Ghana
- List of governors of the Gold Coast
- List of colonial governors of the Danish Gold Coast
- List of colonial governors of the Dutch Gold Coast

== Heads of traditional states ==
=== Akan states ===
- List of rulers of the Akan state of Adanse
- List of rulers of the Akan state of Akuapem
- List of rulers of the Akan state of Akuapem Anafo
- List of rulers of the Akan state of Akuapem Guan
- List of rulers of the Akan state of Akuapem Okere
- List of rulers of the Akan state of Akyem Abuakwa
- List of rulers of the Akan state of Akyem Bosume
- List of rulers of the Akan state of Akyem Kotoku
- Rulers of the Akan state of Asante (Asanteman)
- List of rulers of the Akan state of Assin Apimenem
- List of rulers of the Akan state of Assin Atadanso
- List of rulers of the Akan states of Akwamu and Twifo-Heman
- List of rulers of the Akan state of Bono-Tekyiman
- List of rulers of the Akan state of Denkyira
- List of rulers of the Akan state of Dwaben
- List of rulers of the Fante Confederation
- List of rulers of the Akan state of Gyaaman
- List of rulers of the Akan state of Manya Krobo

=== Ewe states ===
- List of rulers of the Ewe state of Anlo
- List of rulers of the Ewe state of Peki

=== Gã (Nkran) (Accra) ===
- List of rulers of Gã (Nkran)

=== Northern States ===
- List of rulers of the Kingdom of Dagbon
- List of rulers of the Northern state of Gonja
- List of rulers of the Northern state of Mamprusi
- List of rulers of Nanumba

== Heads of former states ==
- Rulers of the Ashanti, see List of rulers of Asante

== See also ==
- Lists of office-holders
