= Agyeman =

Agyeman is a surname. Notable people with the surname include:

- Agyeman Prempeh Opoku (born 1989), Ghanaian football player
- Albert Agyeman (born 1977), Ghanaian sprinter
- Dickson Agyeman (born 1985), Belgian football player
- Edward Agyeman-Duah (born 1973), Ghanaian football player
- Emmanuel Agyemang-Badu (born 1990), Ghanaian football player
- Fredua Agyeman (1797–1867), Asantehene (King of the Ashanti), 1834–1867
- Freema Agyeman (born 1979), British actress
- Hackman Owusu-Agyeman (born 1941), Ghanaian politician
- Julian Agyeman (born 1958), urban planning and environmental social science scholar
- Mariam Kaleem Agyeman-Buahin (born 1984), Ghanaian marketer
- Nana Konadu Agyeman Rawlings (born 1948), First Lady of Ghana
- Priscilla Opoku Agyeman (born 1991), Ghanaian actress and women's advocate

== See also ==
- Agyeman Badu Stadium, multi-use stadium in Dormaa Ahenkro, Ghana
- Agyemang
