= Agyemang =

Agyemang is a Ghanaian surname. Notable people with the surname include:

- Albert Agyemang (born 1977), Ghanaian sprinter
- Emmanuel Agyemang (born 2004), Ghanaian footballer
- Louis Agyemang (born 1983), Ghanaian footballer
- Michelle Agyemang (born 2006), English footballer
- Patrick Agyemang (footballer, born 1980), Ghanaian footballer
- Patrick Agyemang (soccer, born 2000), American soccer player

== See also ==
- Emmanuel Agyemang-Badu (born 1990), Ghanaian footballer
- Agyeman
