= List of Uukwaluudhi kings =

This is a list of the kings of the Uukwaluudhi people, a Namibian subtribe of the Owambo. The kings all reside at the Royal Homestead in Tsandi.

- Amukwa yAmunyela
- Nakakwiila kAmunyela
- Kamongwa
- Natshilongo shIikombo
- Shiikwa shAmupindi
- Niilenge yaShipuula shaMongwa
- Uushona uEndjila dhaMongwa, reigned until approximately 1850
- Shikongo shIipinge yUusiku, reigned from approximately 1850 until his death in 1902.
- Niilenge yAmukwa, reigned from 1902 until his death in 1908
- Iita ya Nalitoke, reigned from 1908. The circumstances of his death in 1909 have been described as "mysterious"
- Mwaala gwa Nashilongo, nephew of Iita ya Nalitoke, born around 1880 in Olukulo, died in 1959. He is credited with the introduction of freedom and human rights to the Uukwaluudhi tribe, changing old customary practices of executing people accused of planning to overthrowing the king, and of killing potential male successors to the throne after birth. Mwaala gwa Nashilongo was the first Uukwaluudhi king to have had a twin brother. Customary, no twin could ascend to the throne due to the belief that twins bring bad luck.
- Josea Shikongo sha Taapopi ya Shitaatala reigns since 1959.
