= Bazigaba =

Clan of the African Great Lakes region

The Bazigaba or Zigaba clan is a large multi-tribal clan of the great Banyakitara people in the African Great Lakes region. One who belongs to this clan is called Omuzigaba/ Muzigaba/Umuzigaba and the plural is Abazigaba. Because of their prior nomadic pastoralist nature, they are commonly found among the Banyarwanda Bakiga, Barundi Banyankore, Banyambo, Ha people,Bahaya, Batagwenda, Banyaruguru,Banyamulenge and to some extent among the Bakooki and Basongora tribes to this present day. They are found in various places, including Nduga, Gisaka, Bwisha, Ndorwa, Mubari, Bufumbira, Rukiga and many other places chiefly in southwestern Uganda, Rwanda and northwest Tanzania.

According to Bazigaba's oral history, the Bazigaba descend from an eponymous ancestor named Kazigaba who along with his brother Rurenge and their sister Nyirankende originated in Gisaka Northwest Tanzania near Lake Nyanza (Victoria). The Bazigaba eventually settled in the region of Rweya, where they founded the Kingdom of Mubari, located just southwest of Karagwe, with their royal drum called Sera. Their ancestors are Kazigaba, the founding father, and Mungwe, the founding Nephew to Kazigaba. They often refer to themselves as "Abazigaba ba Mungwe of Mubari." The Bazigaba's totem is the leopard (Engwe/Engo in various indigenous languages). The Bazigaba share the leopard as a totem with the Abenengwe clan. The abanengwe may descend from Mungwe

Their taboo is the bushbuck (Engabi in various indigenous languages ). They highly treasure leopards, which serve as the clan emblem and heraldic regalia wherever they reside. The Bazigaba were among the first clans to settle in the Great Lakes region and were exonymically referred to as "Abasangwa Butaka". The Bazigaba cluster includes the Bairu and Bahima pastoral communities. They were largely agro-pastoralists in terms of economy. They intermarried with the other pools of Bantu and Batutsi-Bahima clans, which led to losing some of their original stature and customs. However, some characteristics persist, such as their tall stature, distinct linguistic dialect, and hospitable nature. They established the Mubari state of the Bazigaba, which covered an extensive area—from present-day Rwanda to the southwest of Karagwe in Tanzania.

While in Mubari, the clan flourished and grew in population. During the reign of King Kabeizi (Kabeja), the pastoral Batutsi-Bahima clans, led by King Kazi, arrived. King Kazi married a Muzigaba princess, Nyinarukangaga, and their union produced mwami (king) Gihanga I, one of the first kings of the Rwanda kingdom. Facing pressure from the emerging Kingdom of Rwanda, which sought to subdue Mubari, many Bazigaba migrated north and east into Karagwe, Ndorwa, Buhaya, Kigezi, and Nkore. The Bazigaba clan members in Katerera have an anthem called "Oruganda Rw'abazigaba", which translates to "The Bazigaba clan". The song is about the clan's endearing work towards development.

The sub-clans include the Banyangabo, Batendura, Bamoori, Basaakuru, Batemba, Bahoozi, Banyungu, Bagabira, Bagoma, Bajumbi, Basingo, Baruru, Bakoko, Bareegi, Bagarama, Batare, Bashaaho, And Bajara.
