= Kingdom of Agwe =

The kingdom of Agwe (aka the Ewe state of Agwe) was an African state created by the Ewe ethnic group in the territory of present-day Benin and Togo, in 1812. It had territories that were divided between France and Germany. France established the protectorate in 1895, and Germany in 1896. The kingdom was abolished but the two powers eventually considered their reestablishment in 1901. The kingdom was definitively abolished in 1949.

== List of kings of Agwe ==
| Tenure | Incumbent | Notes |
|---|---|---|
| 1812 | Foundation of Agwe state | |
| 1812 to 1821 | Komlagan | |
| 1821 to 1833 | Katraya | |
| 1833 to 1834 | Agunu | |
| 1834 to 1844 | Toji | |
| 1844 to 1846 | Kponton I avumbe | |
| 1846 to 1858 | Hanto Tona | |
| 1858 to 1873 | Soji Komin Agidi | |
| 1873 to 1889 | Atanle | |
| 1889 to 1894 | Ahrlonko Butiyi | |
| 1894 to 1895 | Kwasihela Diogo | |
| 1895 | State annexed by France | |
| 1901 | State reconstituted under joint Franco-German colonial authority | |
| 1901 to 1930 | Abalo Bajavi | |
| 1930 to 1935 | Kofi Titriwe | |
| 1937 to 1945 | Augustino Olympio | |
| 1946 to 1949 | Kponton II | |

== Sources ==
- Traditional polities
- Worldstatesmen, by Ben Cahoon

== See also ==
- Benin
- Togo
  - Ewe states
- Lists of office-holders
