= Mariam Kaleem Agyeman-Buahin =

Ghanaian marketer (born 1984)

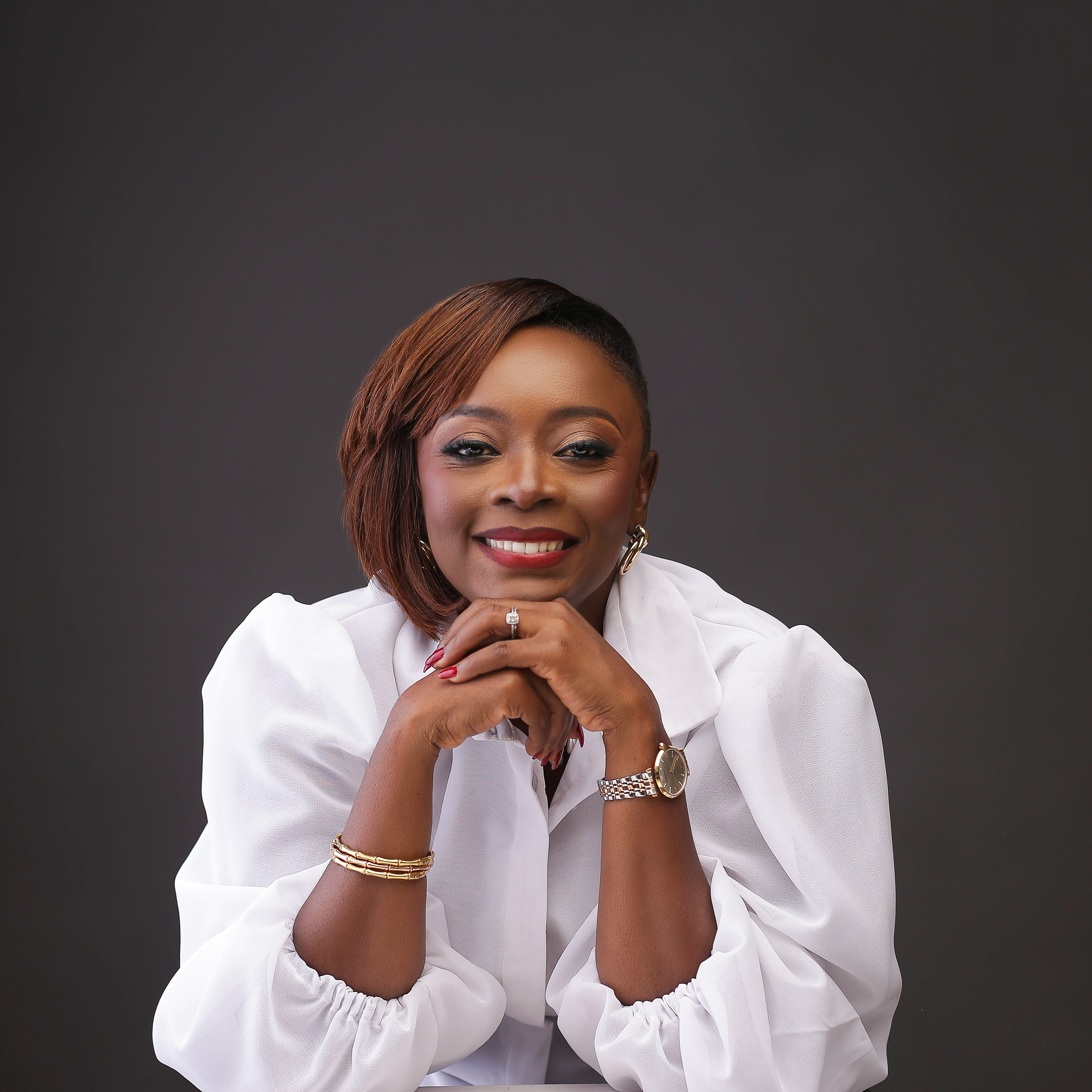
- Born: 1 November 1984 (age 41); Ghana
- Education: Kwame Nkrumah University of Science and Technology
- Occupations: Marketer, Fintech professional, Brand consultant
- Years active: 2016–present
- Employer: Letshego Holdings Limited
- Known for: Group Head of Brand and Marketing at Letshego Holdings
- Awards: Brand Excellence Champion Award (2023); Femtech Personality of the Year (2021)

Mariam Kaleem Agyeman-Buahin (born 1 November 1984) is a Ghanaian marketer, financial technology professional, and brand consultant who is the group head of brand and marketing at Letshego Holdings. She currently works across Africa, focusing on raising awareness and increasing the accessibility of financial products and solutions aimed at engaging underserved populations.

== Early life and education ==
Mariam Kaleem Agyeman-Buahin was born in Ghana. She had her Ordinary and Advanced Level Certification at the Ghana International School, Cantonments-Accra. She then later had tertiary education at the Kwame Nkrumah University of Science and Technology (KNUST), Kumasi, where she studied BA in Communication Design (major in Advertising, Integrated Marketing Communication, and Packaging).

== Career ==
Agyeman-Buahin began her career as a Projects and Client Service Manager at Media Whizz Kids Limited (subsidiary of MMRS Ogilvy Group). Prior to joining Letshego, Agyeman-Buahin was employed by Standard Chartered Ghana. She joined the international banking group in September 2016 as country manager for brand, marketing, and sponsorship before becoming the head of digital banking and financial inclusion, and corporate partnerships. Before banking, Agyeman-Buahin worked with Vodafone Ghana’s head of brand engagement and sponsorship.

In May 2023, she was listed as part of the mentorship team to train 100 girls at the Girls in ICT programme in the Savannah Region of Ghana.

In 2025, she debuted a monthly series called the Insider Scoop with Mariam which focuses on insights for growth in business.

== Honors and awards ==
- Brand Excellence Champion Award, Woman Choice Awards Africa, 2023
- Femtech Personality of the year, Ghana Ladies in Technology, 2021
