= Guingemaro =

Guingemaro (also spelled as Tingemaro) was an early kingdom on Madagascar. It declined during the seventeenth century. As of the year 1640, the king of Guingemaro had 400 wives and concubines. He was considered by English merchants at the time to be the most powerful ruler on the island of Madagascar.

Some scholars believe Guingemaro was founded by slaves who had escaped Mahilaka.
