= Nsonso =

Nsonso was a kingdom in what is now Angola. It was taken over by the Kingdom of Kongo at some point in the 16th-century, but became de facto independent by the end of the 17th-century.

In 1699 a visitor wrote that Nsonso was larger than the Kingdom of Kongo at the time.

== Sources ==
- John K. Thornton. History of West Central Africa to 1850.Cambridge University Press. 2020. p. 206.
