= Kingdom of the Nemencha =

- Map of the Romano-Berber Kingdoms, according to the French historian Christian Courtois.
- Status: Rump state of the Mauro-Roman Kingdom
- Common languages: Berber, African Romance Latin
- Government: Monarchy
- King
- Historical era: Medieval
Preceded by	Succeeded by
Mauro-Roman Kingdom	Umayyad Caliphate
- Today part of: Algeria

The Kingdom of the Nemencha is the name given to a postulated Romano-Berber kingdom located in the Nemencha Mountains of what is present-day Algeria. The historicity of the kingdom was proposed by the French historian Christian Courtois in his 1955 book Les Vandales Et L'Afrique. Whether this kingdom existed as a real polity is far from certain, with the historian Abdallah Laroui arguing that Courtois's reasoning for its existence is "problematic".

== See also ==
- Mauro-Roman Kingdom
- Exarchate of Africa

== Bibliography ==
- Courtois, Christian (1955). Les Vandales et l'Afrique (in French). Paris: Arts et Métiers graphiques – via Internet Archive.
- Ilevbare, J. A. Carthage, Rome and the Berbers. Ibadan University Press.
- Laroui, Abdallah (1977). The History of the Maghrib: An Interpretive Essay. Princeton University Press. ISBN 9781400869985.
