= Mahi people =

Ethnic group in Benin

The Mahi are a people of Benin. They live north of Abomey, from the Togo border on the west to the Zou River on the east, and south to Cové between the Zou and Ouemé rivers, north of the Dassa hills.

The Mahi identity was formed in the 16th century as a result of the expansionism of the Kingdom of Dahomy. Small clans of different cultures who lived in the corridor between Ouemé river and Dassa hills, unified to resist attacks from Dahomy, and the Mahi people were formed.

The Mahi established their own kingdom, Fitta, toward the end of the 18th century, and were a target of the slave trade before French colonization at the end of the 19th century. Because of the slave-trade to the Americas, Mahi influence can be found in Afro-Brazilian religions and Afro-Haitian Haitian Vodou.

== See also ==
- Rulers of the Mahi state of Fitta
- Rulers of the Mahi state of Savalu
- Haitian Vodou

== Sources ==
- Aderinto, Saheed (2017). African Kingdoms: An Encyclopedia of Empires and Civilizations. p. 188. ISBN 9781610695794.
- Castro, Yeda Pessoa de (2004). Sistema Estadual de Planejamento (ed.). A língua mina-jeje no Brasil: um falar africano em Ouro Preto do século XVIII (in Portuguese). ISBN 8585930454.
- Fage, J. D.; Gray, Richard; Oliver, Roland Anthony (1975). The Cambridge History of Africa. Vol. 4. ISBN 9780521204132.
- Verger, Pierre (1999). EdUSP (ed.). Notas sobre o culto aos orixás e voduns na Bahia de Todos os Santos, no Brasil, e na antiga costa dos escravos, na África (in Portuguese). ISBN 8531404754.
- Yi, J. F. Ade Aja (2010). UNESCO (ed.). História Geral da África – Vol. VI – África do século XIX à década de 1880. ISBN 978-8576521280.
- Fadaïro, Dominique (2001). L'Harmattan (ed.). PARLONS FON: Langue et culture du Bénin (in French). ISBN 2747515915.
- Parés, Luis Nicolau (2016). Companhia das Letras (ed.). O rei, o pai e a morte: A religião vodum na antiga Costa dos Escravos na África Ocidental (in Portuguese). ISBN 9788543806372.
