= List of rulers of the Akan state of Gyaman =

Gyaman (also spelled Jamang, Gyaaman) was a medieval Akan people state, located within both Ghana and Côte d'Ivoire.

Tenure	Incumbent	Notes
c. 1450	Foundation of Gyaaman state (Bonduku or Abron kingdom)
Gyaamanhene (Bronhene) (Rulers)
Yakasse dynasty and Zanzan dynasty alternately
???? to 1720	Biri Kofi Panyin, Gyaamanhene
1720 to 1746	Abo Kofi, Gyaamanhene
1746 to 1760	Kofi Sono, Gyaamanhene
1760 to 1790	Agyeman, Gyaamanhene
1790 to 1810	Biri Kofi Kadyo, Gyaamanhene
1810 to 1820	Kwadwo Adinkra Kadyo, Gyaamanhene
1820 to 1830	Fofie, Gyaamanhene
1830 to 1850	Kwasi Yeboa, Gyaamanhene
1850 to 1895	Kwadwo Agyeman, Gyaamanhene	1st Term
1895 to 1898	The Imam of Bonduku
1898 to 1898	Kwadwo Agyeman, Gyaamanhene	2nd Term
1898 to 1902	Kwadwo Yeboa, Gyaamanhene
1902 to 1904	Amenyina, Gyaamanhene
1904	Ten Dati, Gyaamanhene
1922 to 9 May 1942	Nana Kwadwo Agyeman, Gyaamanhene	1st Term
9 May 1942 to 28 June 1942	Kofi Yeboa, Gyaamanhene
28 June 1942 to December 1942	Kofi Tarh, Gyaamanhene
December 1942 to 1944	Nana Kwadwo Agyeman, Gyaamanhene	2nd Term
1944 to 1 January 1963	Kwame Adinkra, Gyaamanhene

== See also ==
- Akan people
- Ghana
- Gold Coast
- Lists of incumbents
