= List of rulers of the Mahi state of Fitta =

The list of rulers of the Mahi state of Fitta lists the rulers of the pre-colonial state of Fitta, in present-day Benin, which was associated with the Mahi people. The list covers the period from the end of the 18th century until French colonization in the 19th century

Tenure	Incumbent	Notes
c.1700	Foundation of Fitta state	
ante/post1800 to ante/post1800	Ayaba Abaoke	
18?? to 18??	Ajiba Abaoke	
18?? to 18??	Zigbale	
18?? to 18??	Limu Madu Zohun Adakpe	
18?? to 18??	...	
ante/post1894	Dikple	

== Sources ==
- http://www.rulers.org/benitrad.html

== See also ==
- Benin
  - Mahi states
- Lists of office-holders
