= Sakatovo =

Sakatovo Сакатово
- Village
- Location within Bashkortostan Location within Russia
- Coordinates: 55°02′N 53°41′E
- Country: Russia
- Region: Bashkortostan
- District: Bakalinsky District
- Time zone: UTC+5:00

Sakatovo (Russian: Сакатово; Bashkir: Саҡат, Saqat) is a rural locality (a village) in Kamyshlytamaksky Selsoviet, Bakalinsky District, Bashkortostan, Russia. The population was 204 as of 2010. There are 4 streets.

== Geography ==
Sakatovo is located 20 km southwest of Bakaly (the district's administrative centre) by road. Kamyshlytamak is the nearest rural locality.
