= Mbadja people =

Tribe in Angola

The Mbadja or Ovambadja is an independent Bantu tribe that speaks the Oshimbadja language Fairly not Oshiwambo Speaking people but due to the way of pronouncing . The tribe consider themselves to be a distinct ethnic group, and the Namibian government formally recognised them in 2002. They originate from Ombadja (Município de Ombadja) in southern Angola, Cunene Province (Província do Cunene).

About 20% of the Mbadja people migrated from south Angola during the 20th century into the northern part of Namibia. They occupied an area of land that they named "Okalongo", which translates to "a small country". Although they may confused by some people with the Wambo or Ovawambo tribes, because of their similar way of speaking, the Mbadja people were never recognized as such among the traditional seven Owambo tribes, listed as Kwanyama, Ndonga, Ngandjera, Kwaluudhi, Kolonkadhi, Mbalanhu and Kwambi. The Mbadja are also referred to as "Ovambadja vaNaushona".

Some of the Ovambadja stay in Okalongo in the Omusati region, Namibia. Like other African tribes, the Mbadja people raise cattle, goats, sheep, pigs and chickens. They cultivate the land to grow omahangu, maize, sorghum, beans, peanuts and watermelons during the rainy season.

The Mbadja ancestors told stories of their origins that tells that they have migrated from "The Land of the Lakes" and moved south centuries ago. It is suspected that the place they refer to is around Lake Tanganyika in Tanzania.
