= List of rulers of Orungu =

The combination of heredity succession to the election. The king is elected by heads of clans, among the son or brothers of King deceased mother's side. This procedure ensures that all clans have a chance to power.

== List of Agamwinboni (Rulers) of Orungu Dynasty (Gabon) ==
Tenure	Incumbent	Notes
ca. 1700	Reto Ndongo	born ca. 1670. Head of the clan Abulia. Founder of the kingdom.
ca. 1730 to ????	Ndébulia Mburu, Agamwinboni	born around 1700, clan Awuru (galwa)
ca. ???? to 1750	Rénjangué Ndongo, Agamwinboni	born around 1700, clan Agalikéwa
ca. 1750 to ????	Rénkondjé, Agamwinboni	born around 1730, clan Abulia
ca. 1750 to 1790	Ngwèrangu'Iwono, Agamwinboni	born around 1730, clan Avangué
1790	Ndombe, Agamwinboni	To reign in 1790 against the will of his father. Ayandji clan. Is deposited and removed by Spaniards.
1790 to 1810	Rénwombi Mpolo, Agamwinboni	clan Avandji. Enthroned with Spanish aid. Capitals: Mandja Island and Apomandé. Grand King of Orungu, then at the height of its power.
1810 to 1840	Ogul’Issogwe Rogombe Mpolo or Passol, Agamwinboni	clan Aziza. He led many wars with its neighbors (including Nkomi), hence the expression "wars of Rogombé".
1840 to 1862	Ombango Rogombe Ikinda or King Pascal, Agamwinboni	Brought up in Spain. clan Abulia. Capital: Osèngatanga. Has always been opposed to signing with the French.
1862 to 1865	Ndebulia, Agamwinboni	Clan Alola (Nkomi), Capital: Izambé. Orungu sells the country to France (Treaty of Cap Lopez and Nazaré)
1865 to 1882	Ntchènguè or Ranyonyuna (litt. the rectifier), Agamwinboni	clan Aguéndjé
1882 until unknown	Avonowanga, Agamwinboni	Abulia clan, mother Benga.
until 1927	Rogombé-Nwèntchandi, Agamwinboni	clan Aguéndjé, died in 1932. Only "moral" authority.
1927	Orungu Kingdom abolished by the French colonial government. Despite lack of European recognition, the Orungu Kingdom is still recognized by tribes of Gabon and diaspora.	

Source : the genealogy has been taken from : Mandji.net

== See also ==
- Kingdom of Orungu
- Gabon
  - Heads of State of Gabon
  - Colonial Heads of Gabon
- Lists of incumbents
