= List of rulers of the Akan state of Akuapem Okere =

== List of Rulers of the Akan state of Akuapem Okere ==
Tenure	Incumbent	Notes
Akuapemhene (Rulers)
Asona Dynasty
February 1994 to 199?	Nana Kwame Henaku, Akuapemhene
ante/c.1998 to present	Nana Otutu Ababio IV, Akuapemhene

== See also ==
- Akan
- Ghana
- Gold Coast
- Lists of Incumbents
