= List of rulers of the Mahi state of Savalu =

This is a list of rulers of the Mahi state of Savalu, located in present-day Benin.

== Rulers of the Mahi state of Savalu ==
Tenure	Incumbent	Notes
c.1650	Foundation of Savalu state	
ante/post1795 to ante/post1795	Gbagidi IV Jeizo Bonanaglo	
???? to 1821	Gbagidi V Bedebu	
1821 to 1863	Gbagidi VI Nyunyisso	
1863 to 1885	Gbagidi VII Lintonon	
1885 to 1902	Gbagidi VIII Zundegla (Zundegla Nozin Wandodo)	
14 July 1902 to 4 February 1928	Gbagidi IX Nyumoan	
1928 to 19??	Gbagidi X Bahinon	
19?? to 19??	Gbagidi XI Gandigbe	
19?? to 2010	Gbagidi XII	
2010 to 2014	Gbagidi XIII Dada Tossoh	
2014 to present	Gbagidi XIV Gandjegni Awoyo	

== See also ==
- Benin
  - Mahi states
  - Mahi people
- Lists of office-holders
