= List of rulers of the Akan state of Assin Apimenem =

This is a list of rulers of the Akan state of Assin Apimenem.

Tenure	Incumbent	Notes
ante1700	Foundation of the Assin Apimenem state
Omanhene (rulers)
ante/c.1805 to post/c.1805	Amo Adae, Omanhene
post/c.1805 to ante/c.1960	Information not presently available
ante/c.1960 to post/c.1966	Kwame Nkyi XI, Omanhene
ante/c.1967 to 2022	Kwame Nkyi XII, Omanhene
2022-present	Kwame Nkyi XIII, Omanhene

== See also ==
- Akan people
- Ghana
- Gold Coast
- Lists of incumbents
