= Mwika =

Former Chagga Kingdom in Kilimanjaro 1700s-1912

Kingdom of Mwika Isarile ya Mwika (Kimwika)
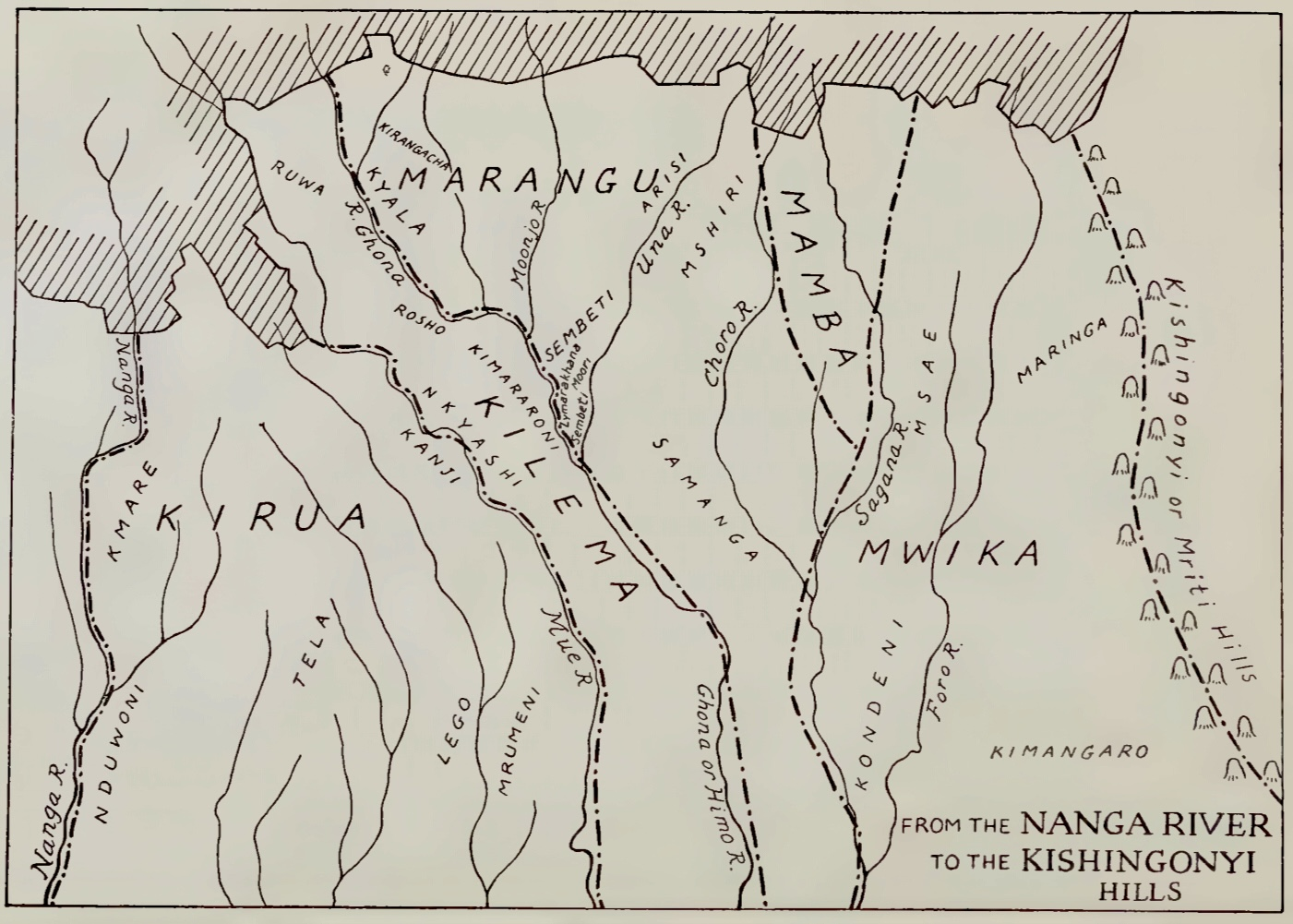
- Map of Kirua, Kilema, Marangu, Mamba and Mwika kingdoms after their unifications c.1950s
- Status: Kingdom
- Common languages: Official language Kimwika Unofficial minority languages Chagga, Swahili,Pare,Shambaa
- Religion: African Traditional; Islam; Lutherans
- Government: Monarchy
- Mangi (King)
  - c.1750s: Mangi Orombo of Keni
  - c.1780s: Mangi Kyasimba
  - c.1800s: Mangi Tenguti of the Mlay Clan
  - c.1880s-1912: Mangi Marealle
  - c.1890s-1912: Mangi Lengaki of Mariki Clan
  - c.1912-1920s: Mangi Ndemasi Solomon
- Historical era: Pre-colonial era; Scramble for Africa; World War I World War II; Post-colonial era

Population
  - 1880s: ~1,000
  - 1950s: ~1,000
- Currency: Zanzibari rupee; Goldmark (1873–1914); East African shilling (after 1918)
| Preceded by | Succeeded by |
| Chagga Chiefdoms | Tanganyika |
- Today part of: Tanzania
- Area and population not including colonial possessions

- Person: Mwika
- People: Wamwika
- Language: Kimwika
- Country: Umwika

Mwika or Kingdom of Mwika also sometimes referred to as Mwika Vunjo (Isarile la Mwika in Kivunjo), (Ufalme wa Mwika in Swahili) was the area of Vunjo in Moshi Rural District of Kilimanjaro Region in Tanzania that was formerly sovereign Chagga state.

== Overview ==
Situated on the eastern border of Vunjo (with Kirua on the western border), the outlying Kingdom of Mwika has a unique history as its so short lived. Mangi Marealle of Marangu, who lived at the end of the 19th century, had an influence on Mwika's history. Originally, Mwika was made up of four older chiefdoms: Kondeni and Kimangaro on the lower slopes of the mountain and Msae and Maringa on the top slopes. Maringa and Kimangaro were located on the east, closer to the Kishingonyi hills that divided Mwika from Kingdom of Rombo, while Msae and Kondeni were located on the west, closer to the Mamba kingdom. Particularly in Msae, the western regions of the kingdom had had a larger settlement density.

Mwika's oldest clans' previous generations came from different places; some came from the plains, while others came down through the high forests. Some people settled there, while others moved farther into the mountains, suggesting that the area was a natural entry point for newcomers. Groups including the Kamba, Taita, and Maasai also moved into the region in the late 19th and early 20th centuries.

== History ==
=== Early history ===
Mwika's earlier history is with its ruling clans. The lower slope of Mwika clans were cattle herders, having shrines closer to the plains, whereas the upper slope clans were mostly farmers, with shrines in the high forest. The first hamlet and the cradle of the first tiny chieftainship were probably Msae. Prior to the arrival of the Mariki ancestors, there was historically a powerful Manga (Mlawa)-Mlay clan; the Mariki, who descended from the forest, resided above the Mlay clan and eventually gave birth to the leaders of Msae. Raising cattle and surviving on meat and milk, the Mangeshu clan was the first to establish in Kondeni, followed by the Teemba and Ngomwo clans.

Historically the Orio clan established itself at the then tiny settlement of Mwika in Kimangaro, which later became the name of the entire kingdom. Additionally, the Orio herded livestock. The Orio clan, who moved from the Maasai region in the west and spread throughout the mountain, are the source of oral traditions from various sections of Kilimanjaro, such as Siha and Kibosho. They established themselves as kings wherever they settled.

=== Mangi Orombo's conquest ===
Mangi Orombo of Keni's raid from the east at the end of the 18th century caused the first significant upheaval to these tiny communities in the Mwika kingdom. Because of this, the Maringa region of southern Mwika was left unoccupied and became a bushy no-man's land until the 20th century. Mangi Kyasimba of the Orio clan escaped Kimangaro with a large number of followers; some relocated to Uru and Kibosho, where some descendants still reside today, while others went to Ugweno in the Pare mountains.

After relocating from Ugweno to Kikuyu, Kyasimba personally returned to Kimangaro to assume power under Mangi Orombo. The effect was different in Msae, where the population increased due to the influx of migrants from eastern regions. There, Mangi Orombo made his home and assigned Mangi Tenguti of the Mlay clan to look after his animals and people. Tenguti increased his standing as a chief of the lower Msae region after Orombo passed away by seizing his old master's land.

=== Queen Mashina's conquest ===
Despite the long-lasting impact of Mangi Orombo, the area was also raided by the Queen Mashina of Mamba early in Orombo's authority and later by the Kibosho monarchs. The location was primarily targeted by these attacks as a means of obtaining wealthier loot. Tribal warfare had almost driven out the eastern regions, Maringa and Kimangaro, by the 1880s, when Mangi Marealle of Marangu came to power. Meanwhile, the nearby Mamba chiefdom began to exert control over the western regions, Msae and Kondeni.

=== Marealle's conquest and decline of Mwika ===
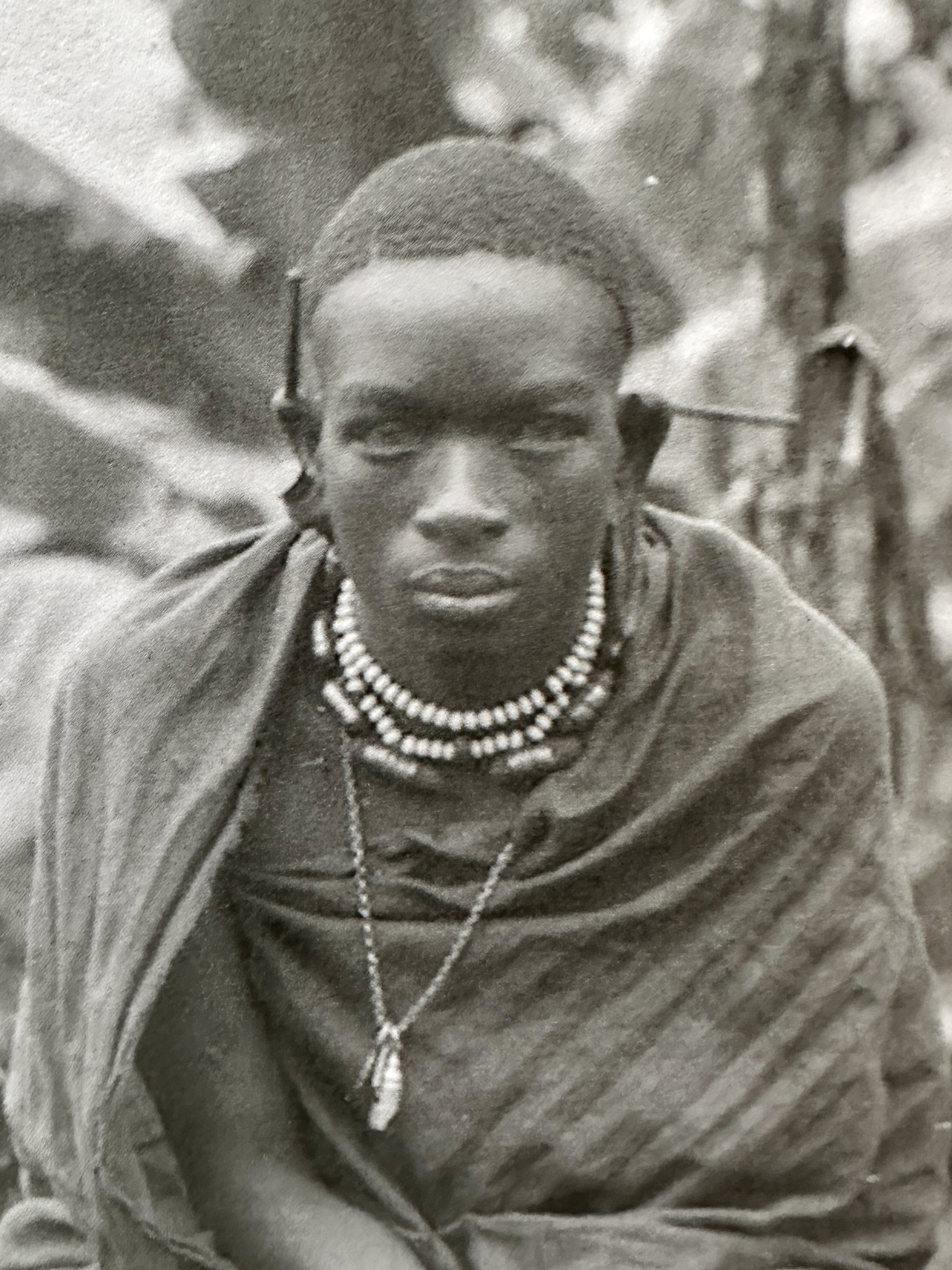
Mangi Marealle of Marangu c.1890s

Born and reared in the Mwika kingdom, Mangi Marealle had extensive understanding of it and sought to influence its political climate by forming coalitions to undermine his adversary, the more powerful neighbouring Kingdom of Mamba. His diplomatic endeavours started in the 1880s and reached their zenith between 1892 and 1901, when he was most influential. Establishing benevolent rulers in the minor Mwika states of Msae, Kondeni, and Mwika (Kimangaro) was part of Marealle's plan during the German occupation.

Marealle gave Lengaki of the Mariki clan a gift of ivory in exchange for his promotion as head of both the upper and lower regions of Msae. This action united the Msae under a single chiefdom and ousted the former governing Mlay clan. By installing a member of his Lyimo clan from Marangu, whose sister Makunde was Marealle's senior wife, in authority, he created a new ruling lineage in Kondeni, which oral traditions depict as being quite similar to Marealle's own house. Marealle backed Mbararia of the Orio clan, also called Mwika because of the location of the Orio territory, as the leader of Kimangaro.

The Orio clan became the primary ruling house again in the smaller chiefdoms of Mwika after Marealle retired in 1912, when the balance of power changed. According to local oral traditions, this change was caused by two significant actions that were ascribed to hostile strategic actions. Initially, between 1912 and 1916, the German authorities requested that Ndemasi Solomon, who was later known as the Mangi of Mwika, seize control of Kondeni, Kimangaro, and the uninhabited Maringa lands, which together made up Mwika. The boundaries of Mwika were firmly established when Solomon was invited by the British to occupy Msae later, in the 1920s.

It's interesting to note that Mwika's Kingdom may never have existed as Mamba had an impact in the populous regions of Msae and Kondeni in the 1880s and 1890s. The chiefs of Mamba probably would have extended their authority over these regions and included the neighbouring uninhabited territories of Maringa and Kimangaro if they had won the favour of the Germans. As a result, the Mamba chiefdom would have grown in size and population, extending eastward to the Kishingonyi hills.

But Marealle actively resisted this growth, attempting to undermine Mamba by establishing the Mwika Kingdom; as a result, Mwika is primarily the result of Marealle's diplomatic manoeuvre.

== Chiefdoms of Mwika ==
MWika was dived into a number of chiefdoms with their own Mangis and ruling clans.

| Kondeni | The chiefdom was located in the southwest corner of the kingdom, west of the Foro River. It is believed to be the birthplace of Marealle. The chiefdom was invaded by Ndemasi Solomon and taken over by the Germans. For most of its history, Kondeni was under the Mamba Kingdom. |
| Msae | Msae, which was home to the Mlay clan and was regarded as one of the first settlements in Mwika, was situated above the foothills in the northwest of the Kingdom and was initially influenced by Mamba. |
| Maringa | Because of Mangi Orombo's attack, which left the majority of the region uninhabited until the 20th century, Maringa was regarded as the least populous government location on Kilimanjaro. |
| Kimangaro | home of Mneney, the Orio clan's place of worship. It served as the capital of the Mwika kingdom. |

== See also ==
- Chagga states
- Machame
- Kingdom of Masama
- Kibosho
- Old Moshi
- Siha
- Kingdom of Mbokomu
