= List of rulers of the Akan state of Assin Atadanso =

This is a list of rulers of the Akan state of Assin Atadanso.

== List of rulers of the Akan state of Assin Atadanso ==
Tenure	Incumbent	Notes
Omanhene (rulers)
ante/c.1805 to post/c.1805	Kwadwo Otibu, Omanhene	Co-ruler
ante/c.1805 to post/c.1805	Kwaku Aputae, Omanhene	Co-ruler
ante/c.1844 to 1853	Kwadwo Otibu, Omanhene	Not the same as above
1853 to 1951	information not available
1951 to August 1961	Tibu Asare II, Omanhene	1st Term
1961 to 1986	..., Omanhene
1986 to present	Tibu Asare II, Omanhene	2nd Term

== See also ==
- Akan people
- Ghana
- Gold Coast
- Lists of incumbents
