= List of rulers of Nanumba =

Territory located in Ghana. Traditional authority of the Nanumba people.

Tenure	Incumbent	Notes
Bimbilla Naa (Rulers)
???? to ????	Kuntumasa, Bimbilla Naa
???? to ????	Dasana Abdulai, Bimbilla Naa
19?? to September 1999	Abarika Atta, Bimbilla Naa

== See also ==
- Ghana
- Gold Coast
- Lists of office-holders
