= List of rulers of the Akan state of Adanse =

== List of Rulers of the Akan state of Adanse ==
Tenure	Incumbent	Notes
Fomase Akyerekyere
c.1480	Foundation of Fomase Akyerekyere state
Adabo	state renamed
? to c.1650
Adanse	state renamed
c.1650 to 1700
Adansehene (Rulers)
Ekuona dynasty
1700 to 1735	Nana Abu Bonsra, Adansehene
? to 1874	Kwadwo Oben, Adansehene	Regent
1874 to December 1874	Kwadwo Oben, Adansehene
December 1874 to February 1876	Interregnum
February 1876 to 1886	Kwaku Nansa Berofon, Adansehene
ante/c.1950 to post/c.1950	Kwadwo Amoako Agyeman, Adansehene
ante/c.1960 to post/c.1960	Adjaye Bonsra II, Adansehene

== See also ==
- Ghana
- Gold Coast
- Lists of office-holders
