= List of rulers of the Akan state of Dwaben =

List of rulers of the Akan state of Dwaben (Juaben)

Tenure	Incumbent	Notes
c.1600	Foundation of Dwaben (Juaben) state (usually under Asante sovereignty)
Dwabenhene (rulers)
Oyoko dynasty
c. 1800 to c. 1837	Kwasi Boaten, Dwabenhene
c. 1837 to c. 1841	Kofi Boaten, Dwabenhene
c. 1841 to c. 1845	Ama Sewa, Dwabenhene	♀
c. 1845 to 1880	Asafo Agyei, Dwabenhene
1874 to 1876	Independent of Asanteman
1880 to ????	Yaw Sapon, Dwabenhene
1959 to 1963	Nana Juaben Serwaa II, Dwabenhene	♀
1971 to present	Nana Otuo Serebour II, Dwabenhene

== See also ==
- Akan people
- Ghana
- Gold Coast
- Lists of incumbents

== Sources ==
- https://rulers.org/ghantrad.html
