= Uukwaluudhi =

Traditional Namibian kingdom

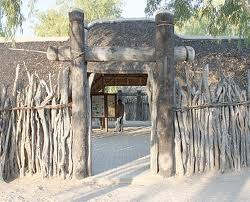

Uukwaluudhi is a traditional kingdom of the Ovambo people in what is today northern Namibia. Its capital is Tsandi, a settlement located about 30 km south of Outapi, and the location of the Uukwaluudhi Royal Homestead. The homestead is situated about 2 km past Tsandi towards the town of Okahao. Half of it is of modern structure where the Kwaluudhi king and queen reside, while the other half is left in traditional Owambo style. The King now lives in a modern house, but the old residence complex has been kept to keep the homestead live, learn more about people's culture, traditions and history. When a homestead with modern brick-buildings was constructed next to the traditional homestead in 1978, the king and his family moved over, to allow visitors access the former royal home. Guided tours takes approximately 1.5 hours which starts at the front yard of the homestead, used as a reception area for people visiting the kingdom.

== Uukwaluudhi king ==
Josia Shikongo Taapopi, is the twelfth king of the Uukwaluudhi. He was appointed by his uncle King Mwaala, who reigned for 50 years, the royal lineage extending through the matrilineal line.

== Uukwaluudhi traditional activity ==
=== Marula fruit festival ===
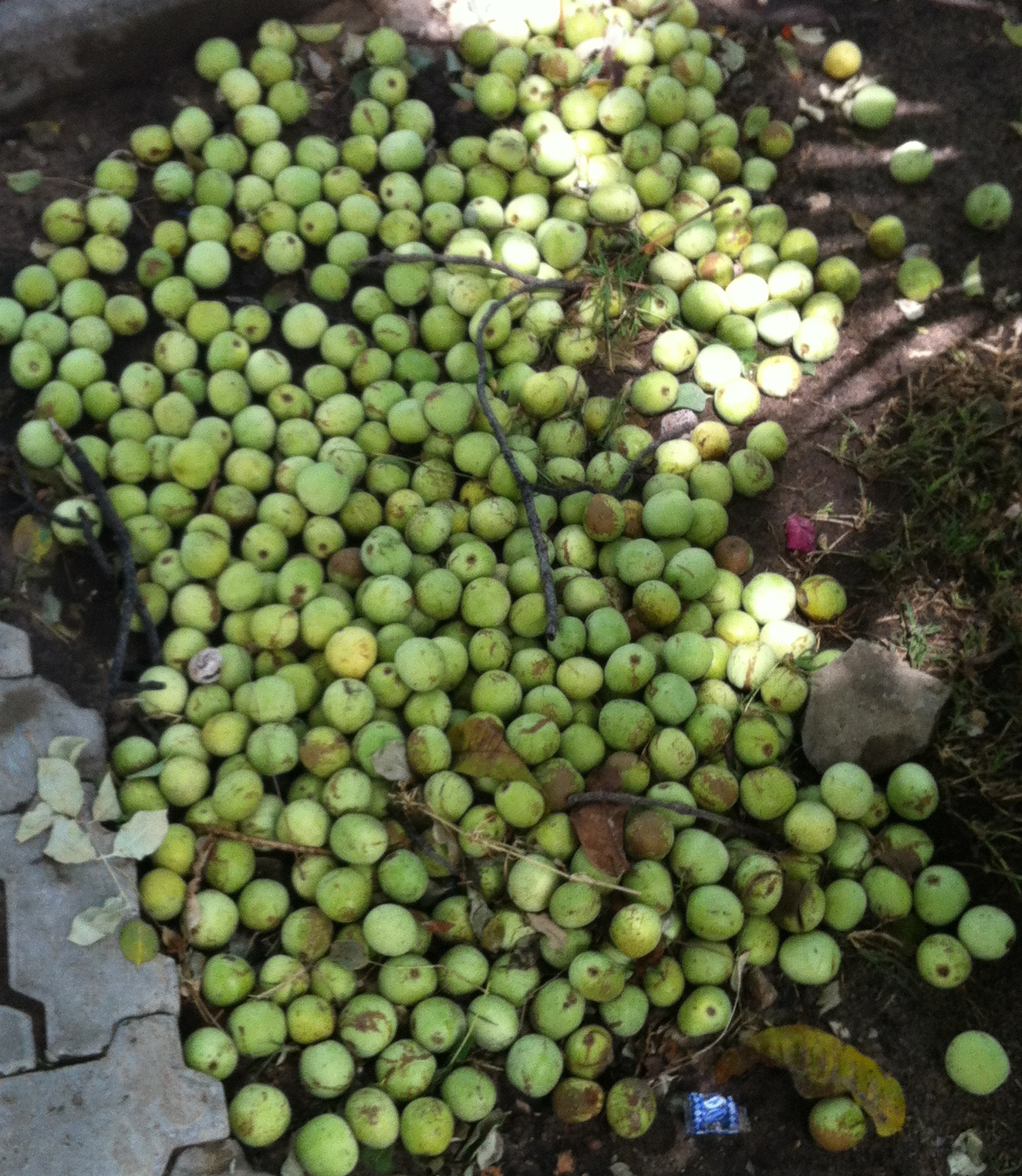

Omagongo known as Marula, a beverage made from the marula fruit was celebrated as Cultural Festival at Uukwaluudhi traditional authority homestead in 2018. The celebration took 2-3 days to unite Aawambo communities of the northern part of Namibia. It was hosted by Uukwaluudhi king, Josia Shikongo Taapopi. The festival was attended by former the founding father of Namibia and its first President Sam Nujoma as well as the creator of the Omagongo Cultural Festival.
