= List of rulers of the Ewe state of Peki =

== List of rulers of the Ewe state of Peki (Krepi) ==
Tenure	Incumbent	Alternative lineage
1833	Foundation of Peki (Krepi) state.	
Fia (Deiga) (rulers)
1833 to 18??	Kwadjo Dei I, Fia	
18?? to 1850	Kwadjo Dei II, Fia	Tutu Yaw, Fia
1850 to 1860	Kwadjo Dei III, Fia	Nyangamagu, Fia
1860 to 1869	Kwadjo Dei IV, Fia	Amega Kofi, Fia
1869 to 1879	Kwadjo Dei V, Fia	Tutu Yaw, Fia
1879 to 7 February 1901	Kwadjo Dei VI, Fia	Nyangamagu, Fia
1901 to 1910	Kwadjo Dei VII, Fia	Amega Kofi, Fia
18 June 1910 to 12 July 1917	Kwadjo Dei VIII, Fia	Nyangamagu, Fia
18 August 1917 to 22 October 1921	Kwadjo Dei IX, Fia	Amega Kofi, Fia
16 November 1921 to post/c. 1960	Kwadjo Dei X, Fia	Nyangamagu, Fia
8 May 1961 to May 2009	Kwadjo Dei XI, Fia	
2009 to 12 November 2017	Regency	
12 November 2017 to present	Kwadzo Dei XII, Fia	

== See also ==
- Ewe people
- Ghana
- Gold Coast
- Lists of incumbents
