= List of rulers of Wadai =

The rulers of the Wadai Sultanate ruled a territory today located in the north of the Republic of Chad.

There have been three states of Wadai, with the first dated to pre-1500. In the 14th century, Wadai became a "quasi independent" state of the Maba people but was destroyed at end of the 15th century. A second Wadai state grew out of the first and was conquered by the Tunjur kingdom in the 16th century. In 1611, a Maba named Abd al-Krim expelled the Tunjur and became the first Kolak (King) in 1635, marking the beginning of the third Wadai state. France invaded Wadai in 1909 and annexed it to the territory of Chad. French military rule ended in 1935 and a new Kolak was installed, though with very limited powers over the Ouaddaï prefecture. The state was suppressed France from 1912 to 1935 and by the Chad government from 1960 to 1970.

The current Kolak Cherif Abdelhadi Mahdi was appointed by the central government of Chad, which caused uproar because he was not related to his predecessor. However, he is descended from Kolak Muhammad Sharif (r. 1843–1858). The previous Kolak was dismissed in July 2019 following ethnic clashes in the region.

| Name | Reign Start | Reign End | Title | Father |
|---|---|---|---|---|
| Unknown | Before c. 1500 | | Malik (King) | – |
| Karama | c. 1500 | ? | Malik (King) | – |
| Gamal ad-Din | ? | ? | Malik (King) | – |
| Durdur | ? | ? | Malik (King) | – |
| al-Kamin | ? | ? | Malik (King) | – |
| Muhammad Tunjur | ? | ? | Sultan | – |
| Yakub al-Mwakir | ? | ? | Sultan | – |
| Hamid | ? | ? | Sultan | – |
| Daud | ? | 1635 | Sultan | – |
| Abd al-Krim | 1635 | 1655 | Kolak (King) | – |
| Sharuf (Also known as Kharut al-Khabir) | 1655 | 1678 | Kolak (King) | – |
| Sharif (Also known as Kharif) | 1678 | 1681 | Kolak (King) | – |
| Yakob Arous | 1681 | 1707 | Kolak (King) | – |
| Kharut al-Sarhir | 1707 | 1747 | Kolak (King) | – |
| Muhammad Jawda (Also known as Joda) | 1747 | 1795 | Kolak (King) | – |
| Salih Deret | 1795 | 1803 | Kolak (King) | Muhammad Jawda |
| Abd al-Karim (Also known as Sabun) | 1803 | 1813 | Kolak (King) | Salih Deret |
| Muhammad Busata | 1813 | 1813 | Kolak (King) | Abd al-Karim |
| Yusuf Kharifain | 1813 | 1829 | Kolak (King) | Abd al-Qadir |
| Raqib | 1829 | 1829 | Kolak (King) | Abd al-Qadir |
| Abd al-Aziz | 1829 | 1834 | Kolak (King) | Radama |
| Adam | 1834 | 1843 | Kolak (King) | Abd al-Aziz |
| Muhammad Sharif (Also known as Izz ad-Din) | 1843 | 1858 | Kolak (King) | Salih Darret |
| Ali | 1858 | 1874 | Kolak (King) | Muhammad Sharif |
| Yusuf II | 1874 | 1898 | Kolak (King) | Ali |
| Ibrahim I | 1898 | 1901 | Kolak (King) | Ali |
| Abu Ghazali | 1901 | December 1901 | Kolak (King) | Ali |
| Muhammad Doud Mourrah | 1902 | 3 June 1909 | Kolak (King) | Yusuf II |
| Acyl (Also known as Asil) | 1909 | 5 June 1912 | Kolak (King) | – |
Direct French Rule (1912–1935)
| Muhammad Urada I | 1935 | 1945 | Kolak (King) | Ibrahim I |
| Ali Silek | 1945 | 1960 | Kolak (King) | Muhammad Doud Mourrah |
| Vacant | 1960 | 1970 | – | – |
| Ali Silek (Second Reign) | 1970 | 1977 | Kolak (King) | Muhammad Doud Mourrah |
| Ibrahim II | 1977 | 11 August 2004 | Kolak (King) | Muhammad Urada I |
| Muhammad Urada II | 11 August 2004 | 17 August 2019 | Kolak (King) | Ibrahim II |
| Cherif Abdelhadi Mahdi | 17 August 2019 | Incumbent | Kolak (King) | Abdelhadi Mahdi |

== See also ==
- Chad
  - List of heads of state of Chad
  - List of prime ministers of Chad
  - List of colonial governors of Chad
- Lists of incumbents
