= Ouaddaï =

Ouaddaï may refer to:

- Ouaddaï highlands, an area in eastern Chad along the border with Sudan
- Ouaddaï Prefecture, a former political prefecture of Chad
- Ouaddaï Region, a political region of Chad created in 2002
- Wadai Empire (1635–1912), a kingdom located to the east of Lake Chad
- Wadai War (1906-1911), between France and the Wadai Empire
