= Abd al-Karim Sabun =

Muhammad Sabun
- Sultan of Wadai
- Reign: Rajab 1219 to 1230 AH (May–June 1804 to 1815/6)
- Predecessor: Salih Derret
- Successor: 'Abd al-'Aziz
- Died: 1815; Wadai Sultanate
- Religion: Muslim

Muhammad 'Abd al-Karim Sabun (died 1815) was (Sultan) of Wadai, a Muslim state in what is now eastern Chad, from 1804 to 1815. He pursued an expansionist policy, and was the greatest of the rulers of Wadai.

== Accession ==
Abd al-Karim Sabun ascended the throne of Wadai on Rajab 1219 (May–June 1804). Sabun was the eldest son of the ineffective Kolak Salih Derret. As the result of a conspiracy, his father was killed and Sabun assumed the throne. His father's other children were not yet grown, but his brother Asad posed a threat. Asad fled to Darfur, but was lured back on the pretense that he had support for his claim to the throne. He was then seized, taken to the capital, Wara, and blinded. Sabun became ruler of a state that under Salih Derret controlled the area of the east-central Chad Basin south of the Sahara and north of the Bahr es Salamat, between Kanem in the west and the Sultanate of Darfur in the east.

== Military conflict ==
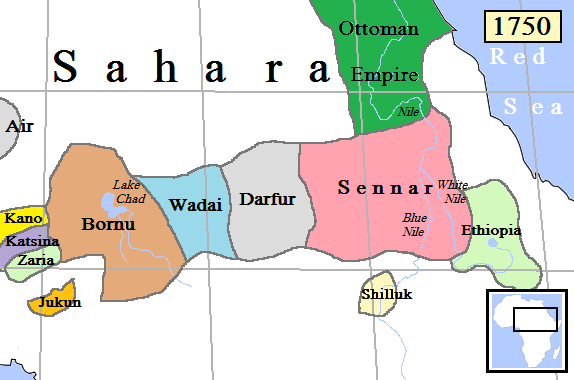
States in the central Sudan

Sabun supplied his army with chain mail and firearms, dispatching them on looting expeditions against Bornu and Baguirmi. Around 1805 or 1806, (Note: The exact dates and sequence of events at this time in the central Sudan differ depending on the source.) Sabun used the excuse that Abder Rahman Gaurang I of Baguirmi had sinfully married his own sister as a reason to attack. He captured the capital, Massenya, and killed the mbang and his family. He took a huge booty including 20,000 slaves, and appointed a puppet ruler in Bagirmi. For many years after this, the Wadai armies freely plundered their southern neighbor.

Wadai suffered raids from Dar Tama, a vassal kingdom of Darfur. Sabun complained about the raids to Muhammad al-Fadl of Darfur and received a conciliatory reply, but the raids continued. Sabun eventually invaded Dar Tama, supported by twenty-two musketeers from the Fezzan, Tripoli and Benghazi. The Tama malik, Ahmad, had to take refuge in Darfur. After further fighting, Ahmad was forced to submit to Sabun and to agree to pay annual tribute of a thousand slaves and a hundred horses. The number of slaves was later reduced to one hundred. Sabun also made tributary states of Dar Sila and Dar Runga.

== Trade ==
Sabun promoted trade and promoted Islam. During his reign, Sabun gained control of a large part of the trade from the central Sudan to Tripoli via the Fezzan. Around 1810 a Majabra trader from Jalu in Cyrenaica named Schehaymah became lost while travelling to Wadai via Murzuk in the Fezzan. He was found by some Bidayat, who took him via Ounianga to Wara, the old capital of Wadai. Sabun agreed with Schehaymah's proposal to open a caravan route to Benghazi along a direct route through Kufra, and Awjila / Jalu. This new route would bypass both Fezzan and Darfur, states that until then had controlled the eastern Saharan trade. The first caravans traveled the route between 1809 and 1820.

== Legacy ==
Sabun died in 1230 (1815/6). He was preparing to invade Bornu at the time of his death. His death was followed by a prolonged succession struggle. Sabun's younger brother, Muhammad al-Sharif, finally gained power in 1838 as a client of the Sultan of Darfur.
