= Wadai War =

1906–1912 war between France and the Wadai Empire

- Part of the French conquest of Chad
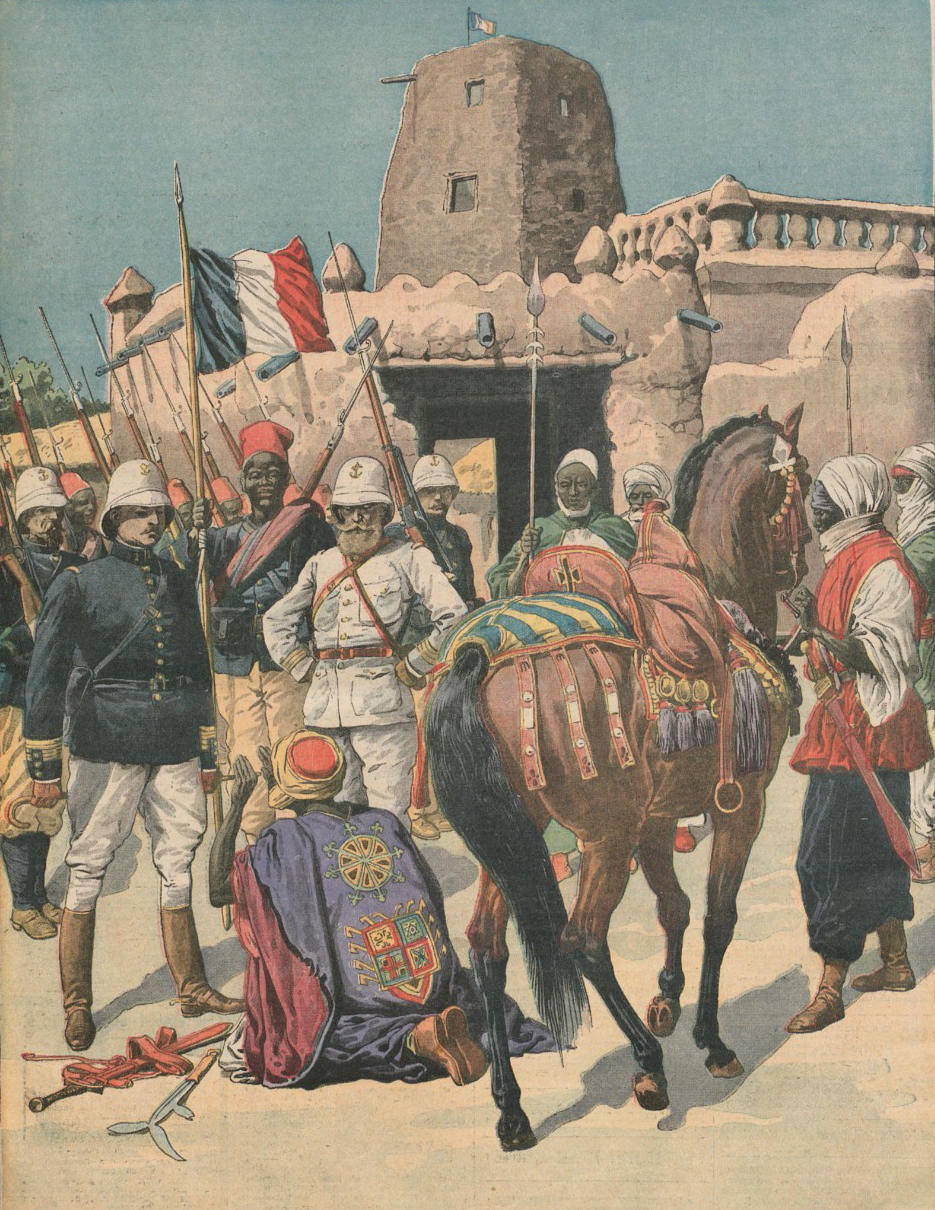
- Dud Murra of Wadai submits to Colonel Victor Emmanuel Largeau in 1911, as portrayed in the French newspaper Le Petit Journal
| Date | 1906 – 1912 |
| Location | Eastern Chad Basin |
| Result | French victory |
| Territorial changes | French annexation of Wadai Empire and subjugation of several smaller polities in the Chad Basin |

Belligerents
| France: French colonial empire; French allies and puppet states: Wadai (Adam Asil's faction); Dar Tama; Dar Gimr | Wadai Empire; Senussi order Sultanate of Darfur; Dar Masalit |

Commanders and leaders
| (France) Joseph Maillard † (France) Victor Largeau (France) Jean Fiegenschuh †; Adam Asil of Wadai | Dud Murra of Wadai; Ali Dinar of Darfur; Taj ad-Din of Masalit † |

The Wadai War, also known as the Ouaddai War, was waged by France and its African allies against the Wadai Empire and its allies from 1906 to 1912. Located in what today would be eastern Chad and western Sudan, Wadai fiercely resisted the French invasion. Regardless, much of Wadai including its capital Abéché fell to the invaders in 1909, forcing the empire's ruler Dud Murra to continue his resistance from outlying provinces and allied states. He managed to gain the support of the Sultanate of Darfur and Dar Masalit, and used these areas as rear bases during his attempts to oust the French. In doing so, he enjoyed some success, and inflicted several defeats on French-led forces. In order to legitimize their intervention, the French installed Dud Murra's relative Adam Asil as puppet ruler in Wadai. After losing most of his forces and allies, Dud Murra was forced to surrender in 1911. Regardless, unrest initially continued: a major anti-French revolt broke out soon after Dud Murra's defeat, and an anti-European conspiracy was allegedly organized with the support of Adam Asil. The last effective anti-French resistance in Wadai was suppressed by 1912 and the region remained a part of the French colonial empire until 1960.

== Background ==
Wadai Empire (yellow) and its surroundings around 1890, from an American map

Founded by the Tunjur people in the 16th century and located in the eastern Chad Basin, Wadai's economy relied on cattle herding and slave trading. Accordingly, it developed a capable military whose main purpose was to raid other territories for slaves. Even though Islam served as state religion, traditional religious practices remained common among Wadai's population. Regardless, religion was used to justify slave raids against non-Muslim peoples to the south. In the 19th century, Wadai grew in power thanks to a succession of capable kings (kolak), despite occasional civil wars. The state eventually forged an alliance with the influential Senussi order which was based in the desert to the north and controlled important Trans-Saharan trade routes, becoming the dominant power in the east-central Chad Basin. Wadai prospered under the stable reigns of Ali ibn Muhammad Sharif (r. 1858–1874) and Yusuf ibn Muhammad Sharif (r. 1874–1898). Caravans increasingly opted to travel through Wadai, deeming it safer, and brought the region much wealth. Relying on its prospering economy and firearms imported from the Senussi, Wadai expanded and subjugated several other polities such as Bornu and the Sultanate of Bagirmi, forcing them to pay tribute and abducting skilled craftsmen to enrich the empire.

At the same time, the Scramble for Africa resulted in the rapid colonization of the Sahel. To Wadai's east, the British defeated Mahdist Sudan and reestablished the Sultanate of Darfur as buffer state. Darfur's ruler, Ali Dinar, proved to be a relatively effective and independent monarch. In the west, French colonial armies had begun expanding into the Chad Basin, where they came into conflict with various local states, tribes, and movements including the Senussi order. As results of negotiations in 1898–99, the British and French governments agreed to divide the Chad Basin among themselves. They decided to assign Wadai to France, whereas Darfur was formally included in the British sphere of influence. Uncertainty remained, however, as the borders between Wadai and Darfur were disputed and regularly in flux. When Ali Dinar of Darfur learned of the European agreements, he was determined to expand his territory as fast as possible westward to preclude a French occuptain of areas which he believed were rightfully his. He increasingly cooperated with the Senussi for military and economic reasons, and thus was gradually drawn into the anti-French struggle further west.

In 1898, Kolak Yusuf of Wadai died, resulting in a succession struggle during which Ahmad al-Ghazali, supported by Ali Dinar, gained the throne. Two years later, the French destroyed Rabih az-Zubayr's empire and established French Chad, directly bordering Wadai. The French consequently began interfering in Wadai's succession struggle. In 1901, Ahmad al-Ghazali was overthrown by Muhammad Salih, better known as "Dud Murra" (Lion of Murra) who was backed by the Senussi order. To reward his Senussi allies, Dud Murra allowed them to trade freely in his realm. As result, Dud Murra and the Senussi forged a close alliance. Despite his ascension, Dud Murra's rule continued to be challenged by rivals. His cousin Adam Asil attempted a coup, but failed and fled to avoid being blinded. Adam Asil found refuge with the French who began to support his claims to the throne. They intended to install him as puppet ruler of Wadai.

== Opposing forces ==
=== Wadai ===
Wadai had a capable and highly experienced military, well versed in mobile combat and the constant raiding which marked traditional warfare in the region. The core of its army were elite cavalry troops, many of whom belonged to a warrior nobility. By 1900, Wadai was able to raise 7,000 to 11,000 of these mounted soldiers. The nobles were supplemented by ordinary soldiers, many of whom were actually slaves. Wadai's rulers were keen to modernize their military, and began importing modern guns from North Africa during the early 19th century. Civilians were banned from owning guns, while the gun trade to expand Wadai's official arsenal increased as time went on. The firearms were usually exchanged for slaves. In particular, Dud Murra greatly expanded Wadai's arsenal, and amassed about 10,000 guns, ranging from older but high-quality flintlocks to Martini–Henry, Remington, Gras, and Winchester rifles, as well as colts. For the most part, modern guns had to be smuggled to Wadai by the Senussi order, as European colonial powers and the Ottoman Empire generally forbade their sale in the Sahara region. As result, the import of guns remained extremely expensive for sub-Saharan states including Wadai. A traveler described in 1881 that the value of a modern Italian firearm would increase up to ten times by the time it arrived south of the desert. The supply of spare parts and ammunition for moderns guns remained problematic, and many Sub-Saharan warriors accordingly continued to prefer flintlocks which suffered from no supply shortages.

=== French ===
The regular French troops from Europe which were active in the Chad were poorly equipped and weak in numbers. As a result, the French relied on African troops in their wars in the region, many of whom were recruited from the armies of allied chiefs and sultans. Many of the French-led troops which fought against Wadai were actually veterans of Rabih az-Zubayr's defeated army who had defected to the Europeans.

== The war ==
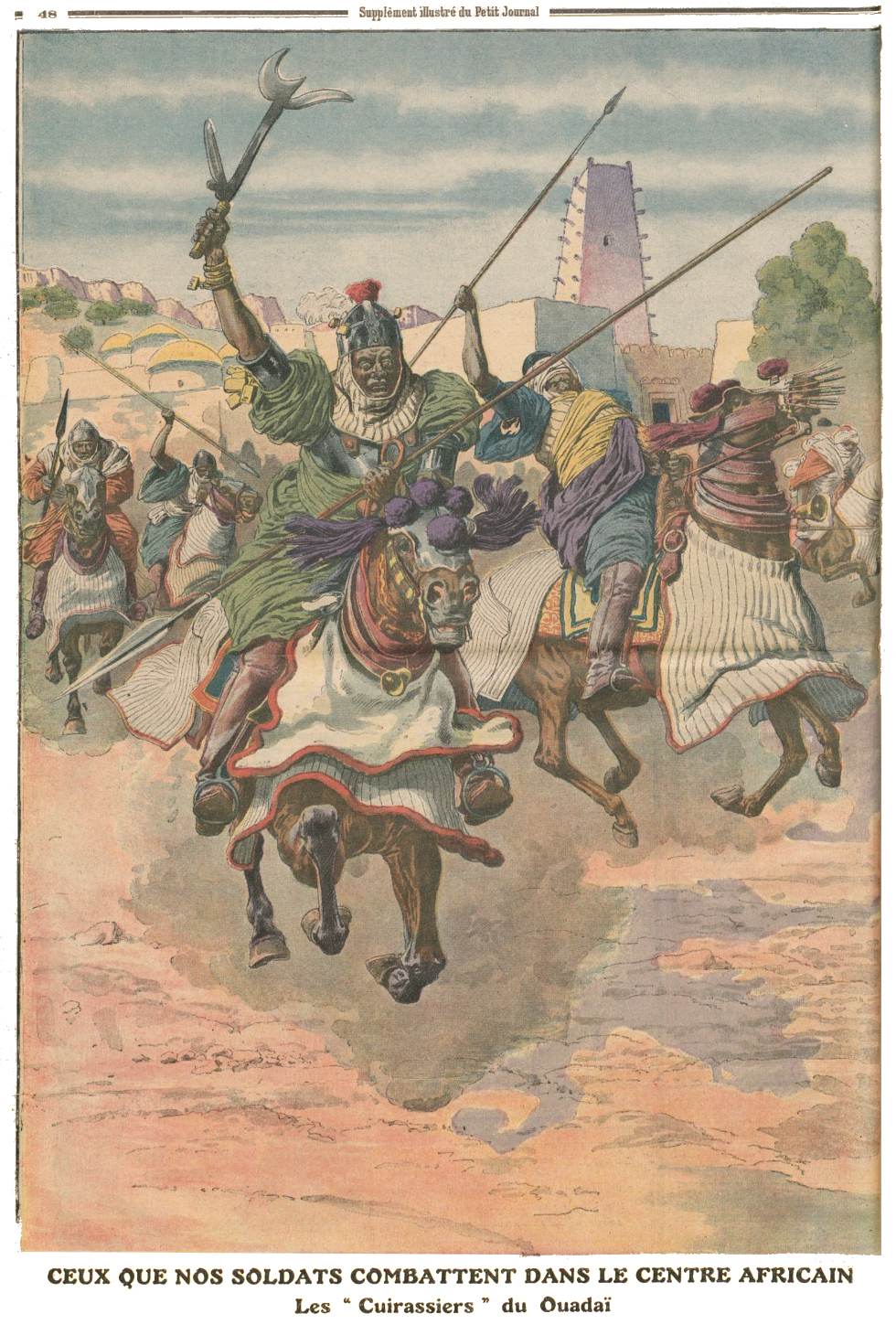
Wadai cavalry in combat against the French (Le Petit Journal, 1911). Despite their often medieval weaponry, the armies of Wadai inflicted several defeats on the French colonial forces.

With the French backing Adam Asil, open conflict between the European colonial power and Wadai broke out in 1906. The French gradually advanced eastward, building fortified posts to support their war effort, and assaulted fortified Senussi Zawiya posts in the desert which reduced the Islamic order's military and economic poweress. By 1907, the French forces were within 100 miles (160 km) of Abéché. Meanwhile, Adam Asil started to launch regular raids into Wadai's surroundings from French-held territories. These attacks were not sanctioned by his European protectors, resulting in tensions. The French even temporarily abandoned him in 1908, but soon resumed their support for his cause. Despite the troubles surrounding Adam Asil, the French continued to advance. A column of 200 soldiers led by Captain Jérusalemy inflicted heavy defeats on Wadaian forces at Dokotchi on 29 May 1908 and Djoua on 16 June. The French killed the governors of the Wadai provinces of Mahamid and Debaba during the latter battle. Thanks to the success at Djoua, a French column of 180 under Captain Jean-Joseph Fiegenschuh was able to occupy Abéché on 2 or 12 June 1909. Wadai became part of the French colonial empire, and Adam Asil was installed as new kolak.

Dud Murra refused to surrender, however, and continued to operate as "shadow" kolak. He retreated northward into Senussi-held areas, and waged an insurgency against the French whose control of Wadai remained highly tenuous. As the French claimed all areas that had been controlled by Wadai's rulers in the past, they also came into conflict with Darfur. Ali Dinar considered their advance into the disputed Wadai-Darfur border region as aggression, and he began to support Dud Murra's cause. Meanwhile, Captain Fiegenschuh was sent after the fugitive kolak who was based in the territory of Sultan Taj ad-Din, ruler of Dar Masalit. Fiegenschuh and his troops were completely wiped out by Wadaian forces at Wadi Kadja on 4 January 1910. Another French force was promptly assembled. Counting 300 soldiers, this column was personally led by Chad Territory commander Joseph Édouard Maillard, and encountered an army of 5,000 native troops led by Dud Murra and Sultan Taj ad-Din at Dorothe on 8 November 1910. The African forces managed to surround the French, and wiped them out in a hard-fought battle. Both sides suffered heavy losses, including Maillard and Sultan Taj ad-Din. Overall, the Battle of Dorothe was a major success for Dud Murra, and temporarily restored his power.

Realizing the seriousness of the situation, the French leadership prepared another offensive. This time, colonial veteran Victor Emmanuel Largeau was put into command of the Wadai War. He launched a comprehensive counter-insurgency campaign, which succeeded in forcing Dud Murra to surrender in October 1911. The defeated kolak was imprisoned at Fort-Lamy, although unrest continued. Shortly after Dud Murra's surrender, a major revolt broke out in Wadai. After this uprising was suppressed, the French fully cemented their control over the region. Wadai's puppet ruler had also outlived his usefulness. Adam Asil was ousted by the French in 1911, suspected of supporting an anti-European conspiracy. Wadai was completely occupied by the French in 1912.

== Aftermath ==
The Wadai War resulted in high casualties on both sides, and devastated the local economy. Famine and epidemics became widespread in Chad, and the population of Wadai fell from 700,000 in 1912 to 400,000 in 1914. Chad, including Wadai, remained difficult to control, and some native rulers continued to maintain de facto independence until 1917. In that year, a French commander also ordered the murder of more than 100 Wadaian dignitaries in the so-called "Cut-cut massacre". The former empire's intellectual elite responded by fleeing en masse to Darfur and Egypt. Hatred for the French government increased, and open anti-French resistance in Chad continued until 1920.
