= Sultan =

Noble title with several historical meanings

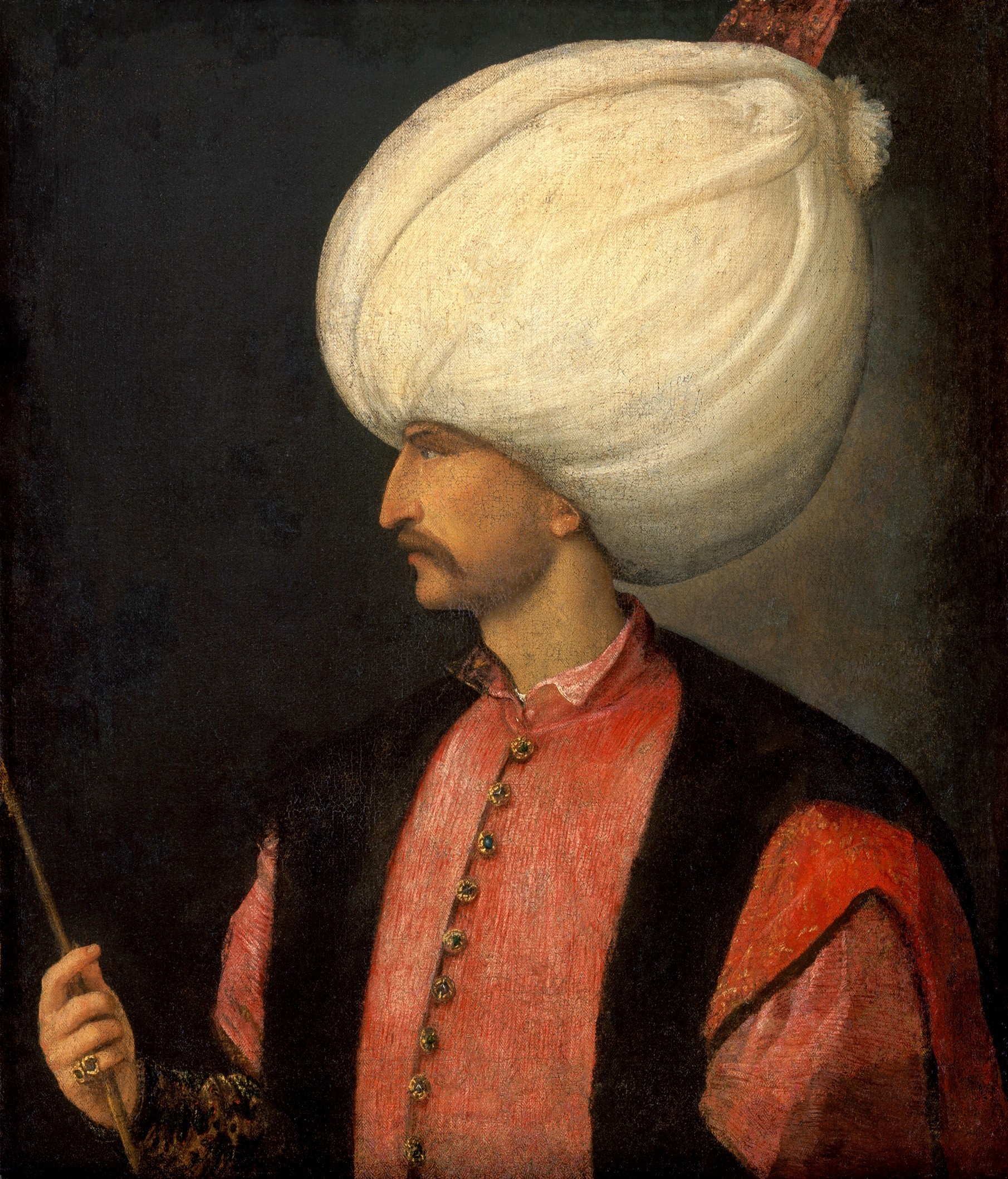
Suleiman the Magnificent, the longest-reigning sultan of the Ottoman Empire

Sultan (/ˈsʌltən/; Arabic: سلطان sulṭān, pronounced [sʊlˈtˤɑːn, solˈtˤɑːn]) is a position with several historical meanings. Originally, it was an Arabic abstract noun meaning "strength", "authority", "rulership", derived from the verbal noun سلطة sulṭah, meaning "authority" or "power". Later, it came to be used as the title of certain rulers who claimed almost full sovereignty (i.e., not having dependence on any higher ruler) without claiming the overall caliphate, or to refer to a powerful governor of a province within the caliphate. The adjectival form of the word is "sultanic", and the state and territories ruled by a sultan, as well as his office, are referred to as a sultanate (سلطنة salṭanah).

The term is distinct from king (ملك malik), though both refer to a sovereign ruler. The use of "sultan" is restricted to Muslim countries, where the title carries religious significance, contrasting with the more secular king, which is used in both Muslim and non-Muslim countries.

Brunei, Malaysia and Oman are the only sovereign states which retain the title "sultan" for their monarchs. In some places the title has been replaced by "king" by contemporary hereditary rulers who wish to emphasize their secular authority under the rule of law. A notable example is Morocco, whose monarch changed his title from sultan to king in 1957.

== Etymology ==
The word sultan comes from the Arabic term sultan, which in classical Arabic denotes authority, power, or legitimate rule. In early Arabic usage the term referred to authority itself rather than a specific office or ruler. Only later did the word come to denote a sovereign who exercised such authority.

== History of the term ==
The word derives from the Arabic and Semitic root salaṭa "to be hard, strong". The noun sulṭān initially designated a kind of moral authority or spiritual power (as opposed to political power), and it is used in this sense several times in the Qur'an.

In the early Muslim world, ultimate power and authority was theoretically held by the caliph, who was considered the leader of the caliphate. The increasing political fragmentation of the Muslim world after the 8th century, however, challenged this consensus. Local governors with administrative authority held the title of amīr (أمير, traditionally "commander" or "emir", later also "prince") and were appointed by the caliph, but in the 9th century some of these became de facto independent rulers who founded their own dynasties, such as the Aghlabids and Tulunids. Towards the late 10th century, the term "sultan" begins to be used to denote an individual ruler with practically sovereign authority, although the early evolution of the term is complicated and difficult to establish.

The first major figure to clearly grant himself this title was the Ghaznavid ruler Mahmud (r. 998–1030 CE) who controlled an empire over present-day Afghanistan and the surrounding region. Soon after, the Great Seljuks adopted this title after defeating the Ghaznavid Empire and taking control of an even larger territory which included Baghdad, the capital of the Abbasid caliphs. The early Seljuk leader Tughril Bey was the first leader to adopt the epithet "sultan" on his coinage. While the Seljuks acknowledged the caliphs in Baghdad formally as the universal leader of the Muslim community, their own political power clearly overshadowed the latter. This led to various Muslim scholars – notably Al-Juwayni and Al-Ghazali – attempting to develop theoretical justifications for the political authority of the Seljuk sultans within the framework of the formal supreme authority of the recognized caliphs. In general, the theories maintained that all legitimate authority derived from the caliph, but that it was delegated to sovereign rulers whom the caliph recognized. Al-Ghazali, for example, argued that while the caliph was the guarantor of Islamic law (shari'a), coercive power was required to enforce the law in practice and the leader who exercised that power directly was the sultan.

The position of sultan continued to grow in importance during the period of the crusades, when leaders who held the title of "sultan" (such as Salah ad-Din and the Ayyubid dynasty) led the confrontation against the crusader states in the Levant. Views about the office of the sultan further developed during the crisis that followed the destruction of Baghdad by the Mongols in 1258, which eliminated the remnants of Abbasid political power. Henceforth, the surviving descendants of the Abbasid caliphs lived in Cairo under the protection of the Mamluks and were still nominally recognized by the latter. However, from this time on they effectively had no authority and were not universally recognized across the Sunni Muslim world. As protectors of the line of the Abbasid caliphs, the Mamluks recognized themselves as sultans and the Muslim scholar Khalil al-Zahiri argued that only they could hold that title. Nonetheless, in practice, many Muslim rulers of this period were now using the title as well. Mongol rulers (who had since converted to Islam) and other Turkic rulers were among those who did so.

The position of sultan and caliph began to blend together in the 16th century when the Ottoman Empire conquered the Mamluk Empire and became the indisputable leading Sunni Muslim power across most of West Asia, North Africa, and Eastern Europe. The 16th-century Ottoman scholar and jurist, Ebüssuûd Mehmet Efendi, recognized the Ottoman sultan (Suleiman the Magnificent at the time) as the caliph and universal leader of all Muslims. This conflation of sultan and caliph became more clearly emphasized in the 19th century during the Ottoman Empire's territorial decline, when Ottoman authorities sought to cast the sultan as the leader of the entire Muslim community in the face of European (Christian) colonial expansion. As part of this narrative, it was claimed that when Sultan Selim I captured Cairo in 1517, the last descendant of the Abbasids in Cairo formally passed on the position of caliph to him. This combination thus elevated the sultan's religious or spiritual authority, in addition to his formal political authority.

During this later period, the title of sultan was still used outside the Ottoman Empire as well, as with the examples of the Somali aristocrats, Malay nobles and the sultans of Morocco (such as the Alaouite dynasty founded in the 17th century). It was, however, not used as a sovereign title by Shi'a Muslim rulers. The Safavid dynasty of Iran, who controlled the largest Shi'a Muslim state of this era, mainly used the Persian title shah, a tradition which continued under subsequent dynasties. The term sultan, by contrast, was mainly given to provincial governors within their realm.

== Feminine forms ==
A feminine form of sultan, used by Westerners, is sultana or sultanah and this title has been used legally for some (not all) Muslim women monarchs and sultan's mothers and chief consorts. However, Turkish and Ottoman Turkish also uses sultan for imperial lady, as Turkish grammar uses the same words for both women and men (such as Hurrem Sultan and Sultan Suleiman Han (Suleiman the Magnificent)). The female leaders in Muslim history are correctly known as "sultanas". However, the wife of the sultan in the Sultanate of Sulu is styled as the "panguian" while the sultan's chief wife in many sultanates of Indonesia and Malaysia are known as "permaisuri", "Tunku Ampuan", "Raja Perempuan", or "Tengku Ampuan". The queen consort in Brunei especially is known as Raja Isteri with the title of Pengiran Anak suffixed, should the queen consort also be a royal princess.

== Compound ruler titles ==
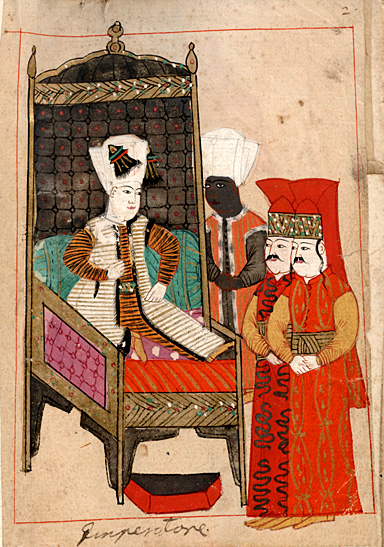
Ottoman Sultan Mehmed IV attended by a eunuch and two pages

These are generally secondary titles, either lofty 'poetry' or with a message, e.g.:

- Mani Sultan – Manney Sultan (meaning the "Pearl of Rulers" or "Honoured Monarch") – a subsidiary title, part of the full style of the Maharaja of Travancore
- Sultan of Sultans – the sultanic equivalent of the style King of Kings
- Certain secondary titles have a devout Islamic connotation; e.g., Sultan ul-Mujahidin as champion of jihad (to strive and to struggle in the name of Allah).
- Sultanic Highness – a rare, hybrid western-Islamic honorific style exclusively used by the son, daughter-in-law and daughters of Sultan Hussein Kamel of Egypt (a British protectorate since 1914), who bore it with their primary titles of Prince (Amir; Turkish: Prens) or Princess, after 11 October 1917. They enjoyed these titles for life, even after the Royal Rescript regulating the styles and titles of the Royal House following Egypt's independence in 1922, when the sons and daughters of the newly styled king (malik Misr, considered a promotion) were granted the title Sahib(at) us-Sumuw al-Malaki, or Royal Highness.
- Sultan-ul-Qaum – a title meaning King of the Nation, given to 18th-century Sikh leader Jassa Singh Ahluwalia by his supporters

== Princely and aristocratic titles ==
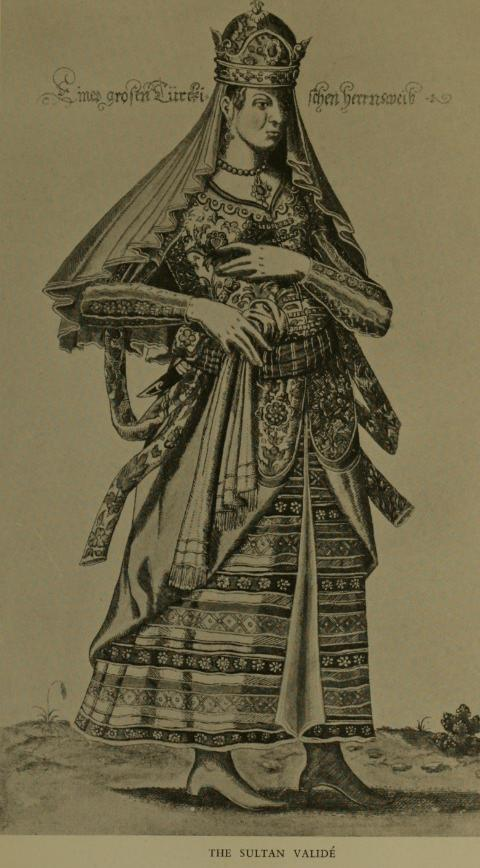
The Valide sultan (sultana mother) of the Ottoman Empire

By the beginning of the 16th century, the title sultan was carried by both men and women of the Ottoman dynasty and was replacing other titles by which prominent members of the imperial family had been known (notably khatun for women and bey for men). This usage underlines the Ottoman conception of sovereign power as family prerogative.

Western tradition knows the Ottoman ruler as "sultan", but Ottomans themselves used "padişah" (emperor) or "hünkar" to refer to their ruler. The emperor's formal title consisted of "sultan" together with "khan" (for example, Sultan Suleiman Khan). In formal address, the sultan's children were also entitled "sultan", with imperial princes (Şehzade) carrying the title before their given name, and imperial princesses carrying it after. For example: Şehzade Sultan Mehmed and Mihrimah Sultan, son and daughter of Suleiman the Magnificent. Like imperial princesses, the living mother and main consort of the reigning sultan also carried the title after their given names, for example: Hafsa Sultan, Suleiman's mother and first valide sultan, and Hürrem Sultan, Suleiman's chief consort and first haseki sultan. The evolving usage of this title reflected power shifts among imperial women, especially between the Sultanate of Women, as the position of main consort eroded over the course of the 17th century, with the main consort losing the title of "sultan", which was replaced by "kadin", a title related to the earlier "khatun". Henceforth, the mother of the reigning sultan was the only person of non imperial blood to carry the title "sultan".

In Kazakh Khanate, a Sultan was a lord from the ruling dynasty (a direct descendants of Genghis Khan) elected by clans, i.e. a kind of prince. The best of sultans was elected as khan by people at Kurultai.

== Military rank ==
In a number of post-caliphal states under Mongol or Turkic rule, there was a feudal type of military hierarchy. These administrations were often decimal (mainly in larger empires), using originally princely titles such as khan, malik, amir as mere rank denominations.

In the Persian empire, the rank of sultan was roughly equivalent to that of a modern-day captain in the West; socially in the fifth-rank class, styled 'Ali Jah.

== Current sultans ==
Sultans of sovereign states

- Sultan Hassanal Bolkiah, Sultan of Brunei
- Sultan Haitham bin Tariq, Sultan of Oman (authentically referred to as Hami), since 1744 (assumed the formal title of Sultan in 1861)

Sultans within federal monarchies

- Sultan Ibrahim Ismail, Sultan of Johor
- Sultan Sallehuddin, Sultan of Kedah
- Sultan Muhammad V, Sultan of Kelantan
- Al-Sultan Abdullah Ri'ayatuddin, Sultan of Pahang
- Sultan Nazrin Shah, Sultan of Perak
- Sultan Sharafuddin Idris Shah, Sultan of Selangor
- Sultan Mizan Zainal Abidin, Sultan of Terengganu

Sultan with executive power within republics

- (Special Region of Yogyakarta) Sri Sultan Hamengkubuwono X, Sultan and Governor of Yogyakarta

== Former sultans and sultanates ==
=== Sultanates in the Balkans & Anatolia ===
- Sultanate of Rum
- Ottoman Empire

=== Caucasus ===
- Elisu Sultanate and a few others. A sultan ranked below a khan.

=== Levant & Egypt ===
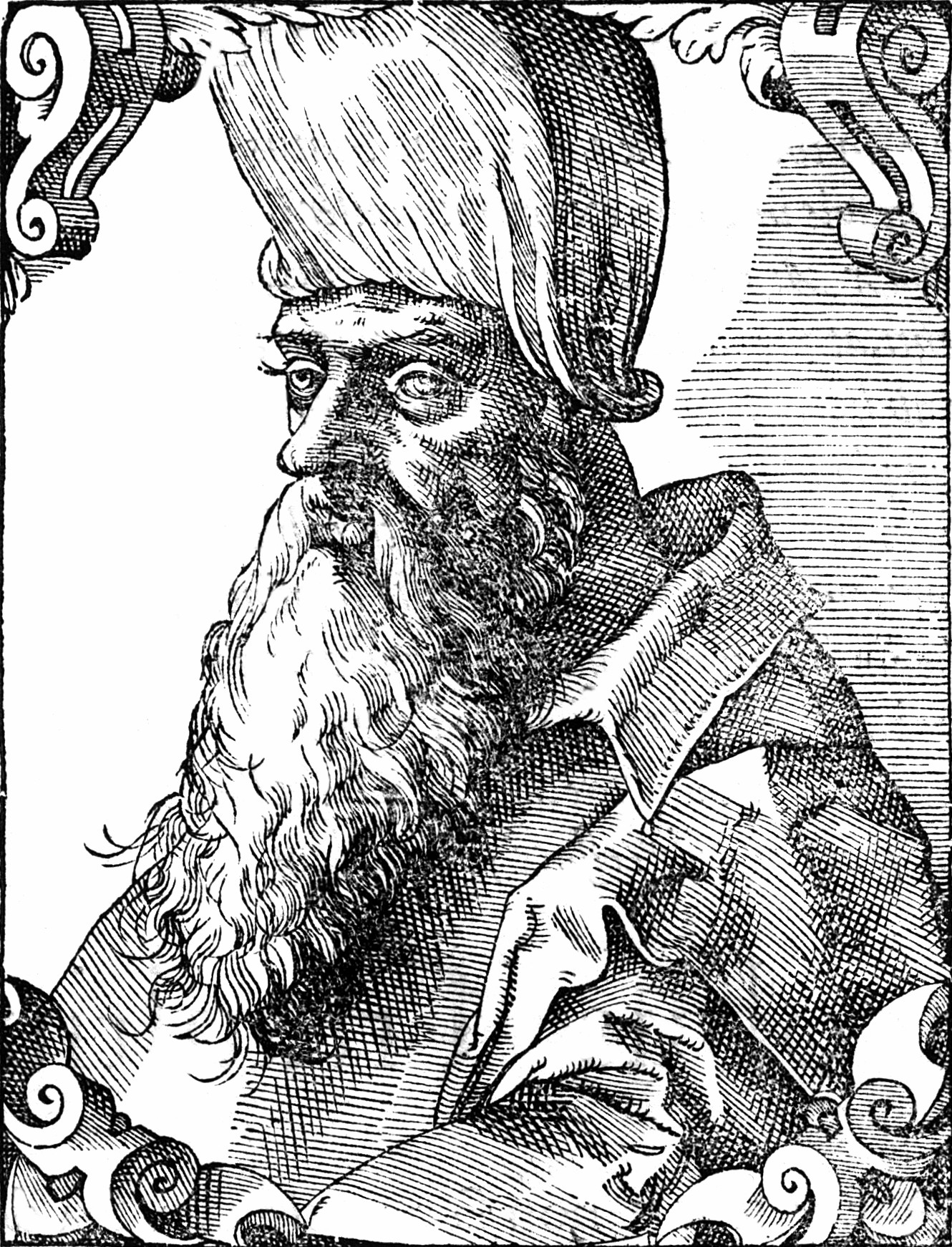
Tuman Bay II, last of the Mamluk Sultans

- Abbasid Caliphate
  - Seljuk Empire (de jure)
    - Emirate of Damascus (de jure)
    - Emirate of Aleppo (de jure)
    - Zengid dynasty (de jure)
      - Nur al-Din Zengi
- Ayyubid Sultans
- Mamluk Sultans
- Ottoman Imposters
  - Hain Ahmed Pasha (self proclaimed)
  - Ali Bey al-Kabir (as shaykh-al-balad)
  - Abu al-Dhahab (as shaykh-al-balad)
- The title of Sultan of Egypt was later restored by the Muhammad Ali dynasty, and was used between the 19th of December 1914 and the 16th of March 1922 during the British protectorate

=== Arabia ===
- in present-day Yemen, various small sultanates of the defunct Aden Protectorate and South Arabia:
  Audhali, Fadhli, Haushabi, Kathiri, Lahej, Lower Aulaqi, Lower Yafa, Mahra, Qu'aiti, Subeihi, Upper Aulaqi, Upper Yafa and the Wahidi sultanates
- in present-day Saudi Arabia:
  - Sultans of Nejd
  - Sultans of the Hejaz

=== Maghreb ===
- in Algeria: Sultanate of Tuggurt, Sultans of Tlemcen

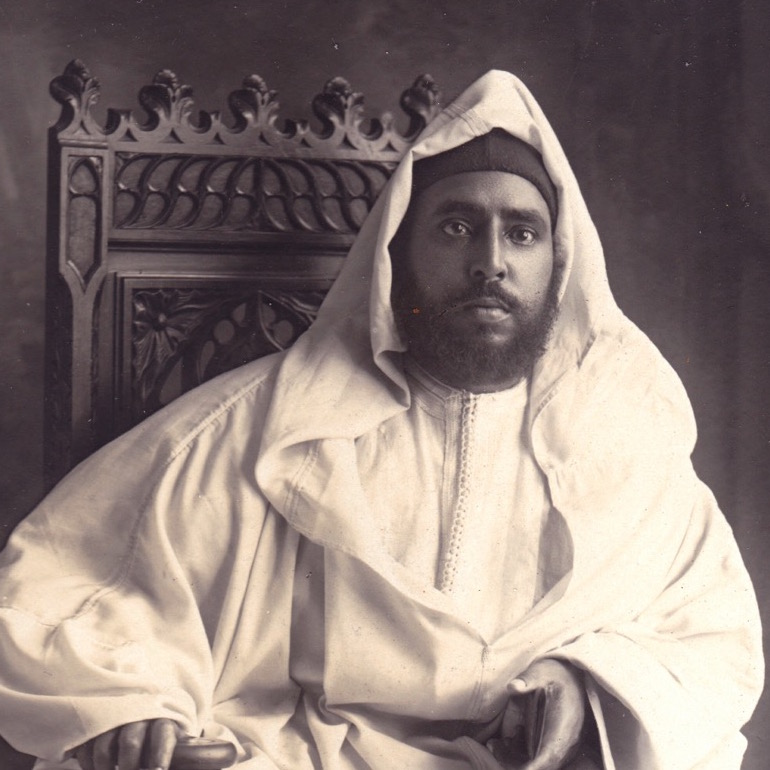
Sultan Abd al-Hafid of Morocco

- in Morocco, until Mohammed V changed the style to Malik (king) on August 14, 1957, maintaining the subsidiary style Amir al-Mu'minin (Commander of the Faithful)

=== Sub-saharan Africa ===
- In Cameroon:
  - Bamoun (Bamun, 17th century, founded uniting 17 chieftaincies) 1918 becomes a sultanate, but in 1923 re-divided into the 17 original chieftaincies.
  - Bibemi, founded in 1770 – initially styled lamido
  - Mandara Sultanate, since 1715 (replacing Wandala kingdom); 1902 part of Cameroon
  - Rey Bouba Sultanate founded 1804
- in the Central African Republic:
  - Bangassou created c. 1878 – 14 June 1890 under Congo Free State protectorate; 1894 under French protectorate; 1917 Sultanate suppressed by the French.
  - Dar al Kuti – French protectorate since 12 December 1897
  - Rafaï c. 1875 – 8 April 1892 under Congo Free State protectorate; 31 March 1909 under French protectorate; 1939 Sultanate suppressed
  - Zémio –c. 1872 established; 11 December 1894 under Congo Free State protectorate; 12 April 1909 under French protectorate; 1923 Sultanate suppressed
- in Chad:
  - Baguirmi (main native title: Mbang)
  - Wada'i (main native title: Kolak), successor state to Birgu
  - Dar Sila (actually a wandering group of tribes)
- in Niger: Arabic alternative title of the following autochthonous rulers:
  - the Amenokal of the Aïr confederation of Tuareg
  - the Sultanate of Agadez
  - the Sarkin Damagaram since the 1731 founding of the Sultanate of Damagaram (Zinder)
- in Nigeria most monarchies previously had native titles, but when most in the north converted to Islam, Muslim titles were adopted, such as emir and sometimes sultan.
  - in Borno (alongside the native title Mai)
  - since 1817 in Sokoto, the suzerain (also styled Amir al-Mu´minin and Sarkin Musulmi) of all Fulbe jihad states and premier traditional Muslim leader in the Sahel (according to some once a caliph)

==== Horn of Africa ====
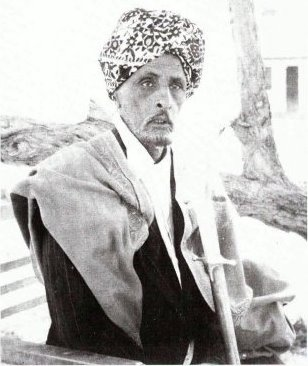
Portrait of Mohamoud Ali Shire, the 20th Sultan of the Somali Sultanate of Warsangali

- Ajuran Sultanate, in southern Somalia and eastern Ethiopia
- Adal Sultanate, in western Somaliland, southern Djibouti, and the Somali, Harari and Afar regions of Ethiopia
- Isaaq Sultanate, in Somaliland and the Somali region of Ethiopia
- Habr Yunis Sultanate, in Somaliland and Somali region of Ethiopia
- Warsangali Sultanate, in northern Somalia
- Majeerteen Sultanate (Migiurtinia/Majerteenia), in northern Somalia
- Sultanate of Hobyo, in central Somalia
- Sultanate of the Geledi, in southern Somalia
- Sultanate of Aussa, in northeastern Ethiopia
- Sultanate of Harar, in eastern Ethiopia
- Jarso Sultanate
- Sultanate of Ifat, in Somaliland, Djibouti and eastern Ethiopia
- Sultanate of Mogadishu, in south-central Somalia
- Sultanate of Showa, in central Ethiopia
- Bimaal Sultanate, in south eastern Somalia centred in Merka

==== Swahili Coast ====
- Kilwa Sultanate collection of commercial city-states in present day Tanzania and Mozambique
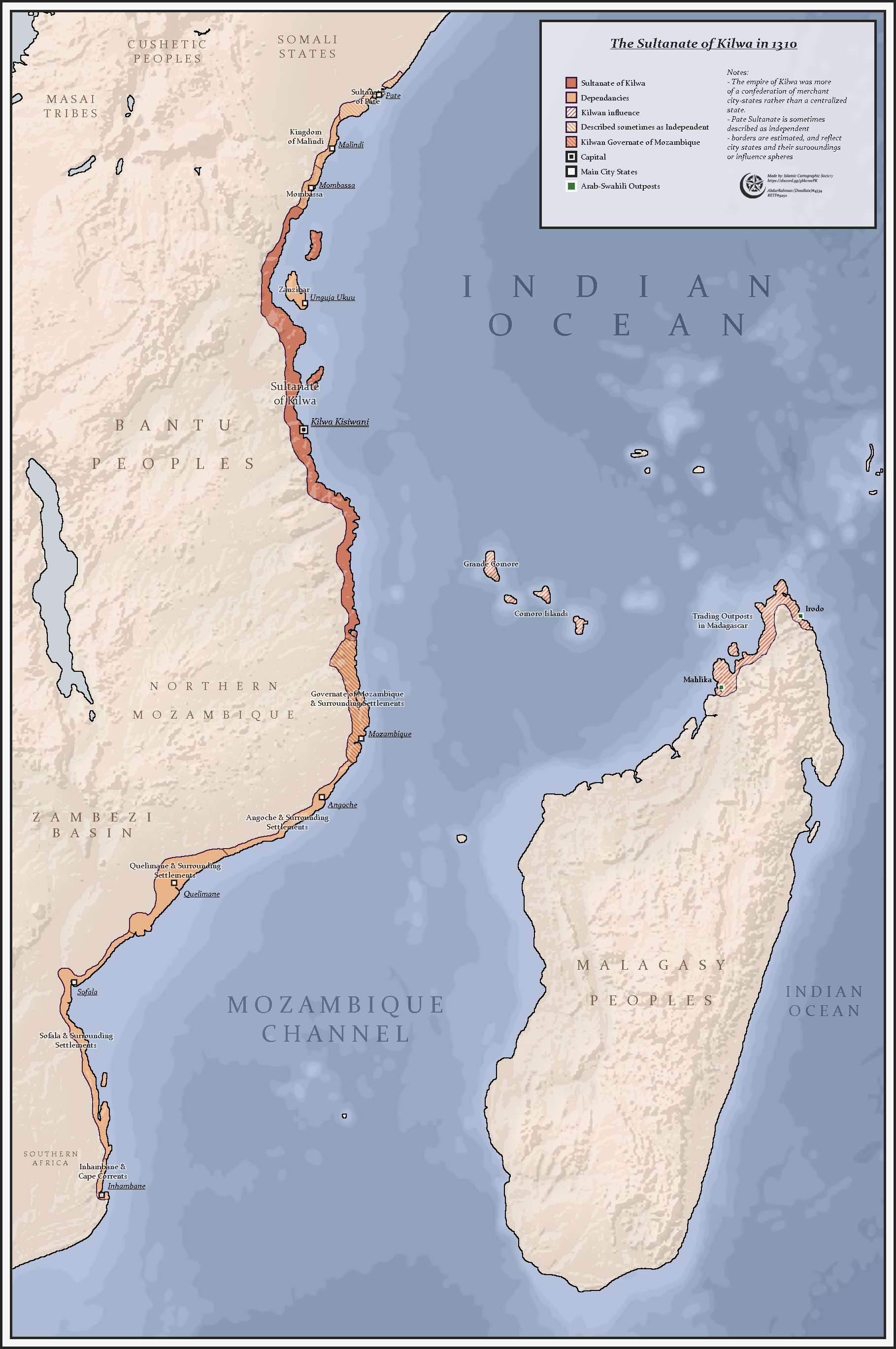
  Swahili Coast in 1310, showing the Sultanate of Kilwa and its satellites.
- Angoche Sultanate, on the Mozambiquan coast (also several neighbouring sheikdoms)
- various sultans on the Comoros; however on the Comoros, the normally used styles were alternative native titles, including Mfalme, Phany or Jambé and the 'hegemonic' title Sultani tibe
  - the Maore (or Mawuti) sultanate on Mayotte (separated from the Comoros)

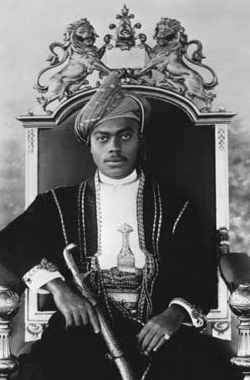
The eighth Sultan of Zanzibar, Ali bin Hamud. Photograph taken between 1902 and 1911

- Sultanate of Zanzibar: two incumbents (from the Omani dynasty) since the de facto separation from Oman in 1806, the last assumed the title Sultan in 1861 at the formal separation under British auspices; since 1964 union with Tanganyika (part of Tanzania)

===== Mfalume =====
Mfalume is the (Ki)Swahili title of various native Muslim rulers, generally rendered in Arabic and in western languages as Sultan:

- in Kenya:
  - Pate on part of Pate island (capital also named Pate), in the Lamu Archipelago
  - Wituland, became a German, then British protectorate
- in Tanganyika (presently part of Tanzania): of Hadimu, on the island of that name; also styled Jembe

===== Sultani =====
This was the native ruler's title in the Tanzanian state of Uhehe.

===== Maliki =====
Apparently derived from the Arabic malik, this was the alternative native style of the sultans of the Kilwa Sultanate in Tanganyika (presently the continental part of Tanzania).

=== Persia and Central Asia ===
- Ghaznavid Empire; its ruler, Mahmud of Ghazni, was the first Muslim sovereign to be known as sultan.
- Great Seljuk Empire
- Timurid Empire
- Sultans of Baneh (In Kurdistan, members of the Ekhtiyar al-Din family governed Baneh as Sultans defending against the Ottoman frontier)
- Afghan Kingdom: Sultan had a different meaning. It was a high title of honour, superior to Amir and Sardar, but ranking below Shah.
- Kazakh Khanate

=== Indian superregion ===
- Bahmani Sultanate: Bahmani Shahs
- Sultanate of Bengal: Ilyas Shahi, Ganesha, Habshi, Hussain Shahi, Muhammad Shah and Karranis
- Sultanates of the Deccan:
  - Adil Shahi of Bijapur
  - Barid Shahi of Bidar
  - Imad Shahi of Berar
  - Nizam Shahi of Ahmednagar
  - Qutb Shahi of Golconda
- Sultanate of Delhi: Mamluks, Khiljis, Tughlaqs, Sayyids and Lodis
- Sultanate of Gujarat: Muzaffarids
- Sultanate of Jaunpur: Sharqi dynasty
- Sultanate of Kandesh: Faruqi dynasty
- Sultanate of Malwa: three dynasties
- Sultanate of Madurai
- Sultanate_of_Mysore: Kingdom of Mysore between 1761 and 1799
- Sultanate of Laccadive and Cannanore: Arakkal Kingdom
- Sultanate of Kashmir: Shahmirids and Chaks
- Sultanate of Maldives
- Sultanate of Hunnur

=== Southeast and East Asia ===
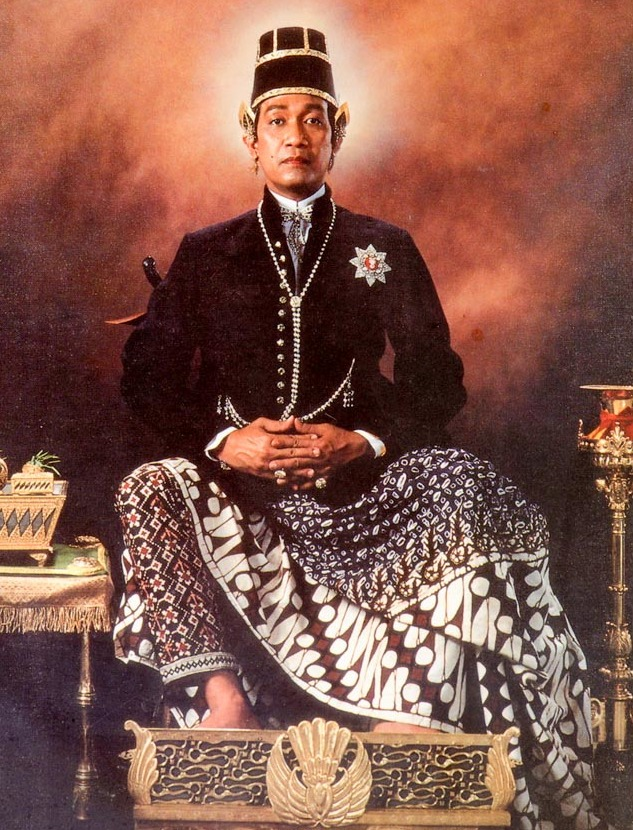
Hamengkubuwono X, the incumbent Sultan of Yogyakarta

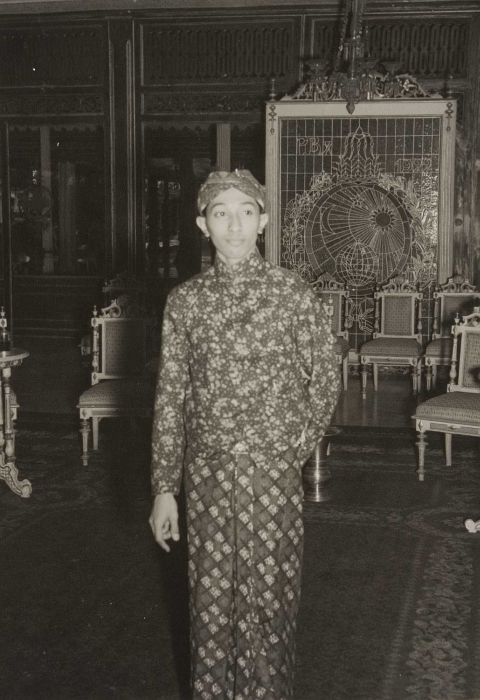
Pakubuwono XII, last undisputed Susuhunan of Surakarta

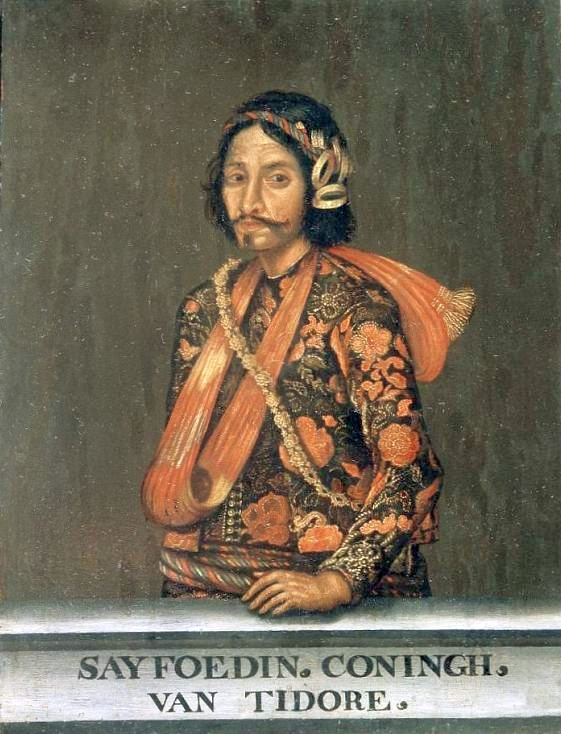
Sultan Saifuddin of Tidore

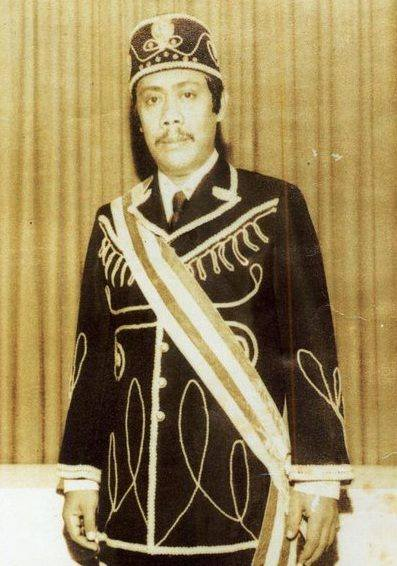
Mohammed Mahakuttah Abdullah Kiram, last recognised Sultan of Sulu

In Indonesia (formerly in the Dutch East Indies) from west to east:

- In Sumatra
  - Aceh Sultanate (full style Sultan Berdaulat Zillullah fil-Alam)
  - Sultanate of Asahan
  - Sultanate of Jambi
  - Sultanate of Deli
  - Sultanate of Indragiri
  - Sultanate of Langkat (previous style Raja)
  - Kotapinang Sultanate
  - Bilah Sultanate
  - Palembang Sultanate, also holding the higher title of Susuhunan
  - Sultanate of Pagaruyung
  - Sultanate of Peureulak
  - Riau-Lingga Sultanate
  - Samudera Pasai Sultanate
  - Sultanate of Serdang
  - Sultanate of Siak
- In the Riau Archipelago: Sultanate of Riau-Lingga by secession in 1818 under the expelled sultan of Johore (on Malaya) Sultan Abdul Rahman Muadzam Syah ibni al-Marhum Sultan Mahmud
- On Java
  - Sultanate of Banten
  - Sultanate of Cirebon – the rulers in three of the four palaces (kraton), from which divided Cirebon was ruled: Kraton Kasepuhan, Kraton Kanoman and Kraton Kacirebonan (only in Kraton Kaprabonan was the ruler's title Panembahan)
  - Sultanate of Demak
  - Sultanate of Pajang
  - Sumedang Larang Sultanate
  - Sultanate of Mataram (was divided into two kingdoms: the Sultanate of Yogyakarta and Sunanan Surakarta)
    - Sultanate of Yogyakarta
    - Sunanate of Surakarta (susuhunan, a high-ranked monarch, equivalent to emperor)
- On Kalimantan
  - Sultanate of Banjar
  - Sultanate of Berau
  - Sultanate of Bulungan
  - Sultanate of Gunung Tabur
  - Sultanate of Kubu
  - Kutai Kartanegara Sultanate
  - Sultanate of Mempawah
  - Sultanate of Paser
  - Sultanate of Pontianak
  - Sultanate of Sambaliung
  - Sultanate of Sambas
- On Sulawesi
  - Gorontalo Sultanate
  - Sultanate of Buton
  - Sultanate of Bone
  - Sultanate of Gowa
  - Sultanate of Luwu
  - Sultanate of Soppeng
  - Sultanate of Wajoq
- In the Maluku Islands (Moluccas)
  - Sultanate of Ternate
  - Sultanate of Tidore
  - Sultanate of Bacan
  - Sultanate of Jailolo
- In the Nusa Tenggara (former Lesser Sunda Islands)
  - Bima Sultanate
  - Sumbawa Sultanate

In Malaysia:

- In Peninsular Malaysia, where all seven of the country's present sultanates are located:
  - Sultanate of Johor
  - Sultanate of Kedah
  - Sultanate of Kelantan
  - Sultanate of Pahang
  - Sultanate of Perak
  - Sultanate of Selangor
  - Sultanate of Terengganu
- Furthermore, the ruler of Luak Jelebu, one of the constitutive states of the Negeri Sembilan confederation, had the style Sultan in addition to his principal title Undang Luak Jelebu.
- Sultanate of Malacca
- Sultanate of Sarawak

In Brunei:

- Sultan of Brunei, Brunei (on Borneo island)

In China:

- Dali, Yunnan, capital of the short-lived Panthay Rebellion
  - Furthermore, the Qa´id Jami al-Muslimin (Leader of the Community of Muslims) of Pingnan Guo ("Pacified South State", a major Islamic rebellious polity in western Yunnan province) is usually referred to in foreign sources as Sultan.
- Ili Sultanate

In the Philippines:

- Sultanate of Buayan
- Sultanate of Maguindanao
- Confederation of Sultanates of Lanao
- Sultanate of Sulu (Sulu, Basilan, Palawan and Tawi-Tawi islands and part of eastern Sabah on North Borneo)
- Sultanate of Panay

In Thailand:

- Sultanate of Patani
- Sultanate of Singgora

== See also ==
- Suratrana
- Mansa
- Khan (title), Ilkhan and Khakhan
- Emir (Amir)
- Atabeg
- Bey
- Baig
- Mirza
- Caliph
- Datu
- Maharajah
- Malik
- Mir (title)
- Padishah
- Pasha
- Raja
- Shah and Shahanshah
- Vizier
- Zoltán
