= Tunjur kingdom =

Historical state in Darfur

- 1400s–c. 1650s
- Capital: Uri (early)
- Common languages: Arabic
- Religion: Traditional African religions, Islam
- Government: Monarchy
- History
  - Established: 1400s
  - Disestablished: c. 1650s
Preceded by	Succeeded by
Daju kingdom	Sultanate of Darfur; Wadai Empire
- Today part of: Chad; Sudan

The Tunjur kingdom or Tunjur empire was a precolonial state centred in Sudan's Darfur region that stretched into parts of Ouaddaï region in modern-day Chad between the 15th and early-17th centuries.

== Origins and apogee ==
The origins of the Tunjur state are not well known. Some Tunjur traditions trace their origin to Banu Hilal and narrate their migration from Tunis, with Ahmad al-Ma'qur as the 'wise stranger' who finds his way to the Daju king's court and wins favour by introducing new customs. Other Tunjur traditions claim an Abbasid origin, and say they migrated from Dongola (in the Nile Valley). McGregor wrote that the Tunjur were likely a Hilali Arab–Berber hybrid, and that they may have been Berbers who adopted a Hilali genealogy. He also wrote that the Tunjur appear to have been entirely pagan at the time they arrived in Darfur, either because Berber traditional religion "reasserted itself" or because Islam was only prevalent among leading families.

The Tunjur migrated to Darfur in the 15th century, and the Tunjur kingdom replaced the earlier Daju kingdom. The states likely coexisted for some time, with Tunjur rule in the north and Daju rule in the south, before the Tunjur people managed to replace the earlier dynasty completely. Traditions say that the last Daju king was a tyrant, and that his population convinced him to ride an antelope which took him to Dar Sila in present-day Chad (where he became their sultan).

Traditions say that the Tunjur ruled a vast area from Darfur in the east to central modern-day Chad; though they don't specify whether it was all one state, the Darfur Tunjur are regarded as 'overlords'.

== Society and culture ==
The Tunjur spoke Arabic, However, they were initially entirely pagan after the migration had finished. No trace of their own language exists. All of the Tunjur oral tradition is attributed in an unusual manner to a single person called Shau Dorsid.

Society in Darfur changed drastically due to the influence of the Tunjur dynasty. Corvée labor was organized for the newly-organized state, long-range trade began, and Islam was partially adopted as a religion.

Tunjur architecture drew influence from Berber and Tora styles. There is a stone mosque, the first Muslim building in Darfur, possibly built around the year 1200, at the city of Uri which was the first capital of the kingdom. This may indicate that Islam was adopted as a court religion. The king however, probably, held a divine status. The city was built in Fur architecture.

The role of Islam in the region ruled over by the Tunjur kingdom, and earlier the Daju dynasty, remained insignificant until the late 16th century. No material remains for Islamization are known from the preceding Daju dynasty's period.

== Economy ==
By the early-16th century the Tunjur kingdom ruled Darfur and Wadai. Capitals of the kingdom were in northern Darfur. The cities of Uri and Ain Farah are associated with the kingdom. Uri, the early capital, was at the meeting point of two major trade routes. It is certain that Egyptian merchants traded with the Tunjur people. Caravan routes and earlier river based routes through Nubia allowed long-distance trade. The kingdom exported slaves, gold, camels, rhinoceros horn, ivory, ostrich feathers, tamarind, gum arabic and natron. Trade was, according to Egyptian sources, under close royal control. Unlike in the newly-Islamized and briefly dynastically related Wadai Empire, it is unclear if the Tunjur kingdom was a Muslim state. However, the rulers of the kingdom were Muslim. Slavery was common in the region, and the Tunjur also engaged in enslavement of other peoples.

== End of the dynasty ==
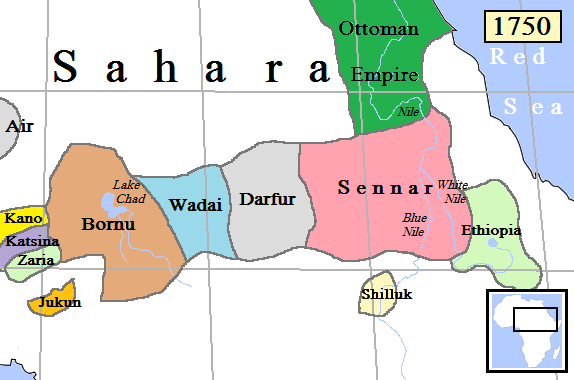
Central-East Africa after collapse of the Tunjur Kingdom. Lands ruled by the Tunjur dynasty were divided between states of Wadai and Darfur.

The Tunjur kingdom was succeeded by the Sultanate of Darfur (Keira Sultanate). The Fur people and their Keira dynasty superseded the Tunjur around the 1650s. A story about a dynastic link between Keira and Tunjur dynasties involving Ahmad al-Maqur is known. Tunjur rule in Wadai ended when a local dynasty of Maba people revolted, expelled and replaced them. The Tunjur kingdom may have ceased to exist as early as in 1611 or 1635.

A branch of the Tunjur dynasty in Wadai was also overthrown by an alliance of the Arabs and the Maba.

Eventually, the Tunjur people assimilated to a large degree into other peoples of the region.

== See also ==
- Alodia
- History of Chad
- History of Sudan
- Tora (Darfur)
