= Tora (Darfur) =

The Tora are a semi-legendary culture that existed in Jebel Marra, Darfur. In local oral traditions they appear as "white giants" who arrived in Darfur from somewhere in the north, which might be a hint to them originally being Berbers. Andrew McGregor (an archaeologist) wrote that Tora may correspond to Tura, a term in Kanem-Borno for the Teda Tubu. The Tora are credited with the introduction of monumental stone architecture, advanced stone-working techniques and agriculture techniques like terrace farming, irrigation and palm tree cultivation. By the 12th century the Tora culture had been succeeded by the Daju.

== Architecture ==
While it is unknown if the Tora existed, the pre-Daju sites ascribed to them are real. The construction methods employed appear to be a local development, different from the architecture of the Chad and Nile region, but still fundamentally African in character. Typical for Tora architecture is the massive masonry which is faced on both sides. Rubble was used to fill the walls, making the structures extremely solid. The largest type of structure are palaces, being as large as 200–400 metres in diameter. They normally consist of stone huts encircled by a wall and were built on hill-tops. The wall could be divided or coupled to present two separate compounds, with two entrances opposite each other. This probably served to separate males from females.

The Tora architecture was adopted by the succeeding Daju kingdom and remained in use in modified form during the rule of the Tunjur and early Keira sultans, but had been replaced by new construction methods including fired bricks by c. 1700.
