= Paul Crampel =

French explorer (1864–1891)

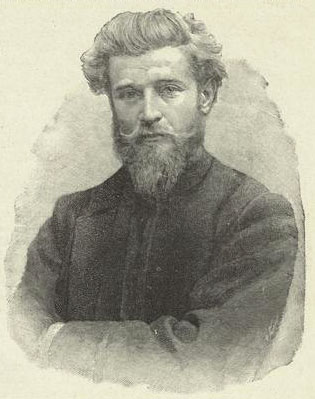
- Born: 17 November 1864; Nancy, France
- Died: 9 April 1891 (aged 26); Dar al Kuti
- Occupation: Explorer
- Known for: Leading expeditions into Africa

Paul Crampel (17 November 1864 – 9 April 1891) was a French explorer who explored Africa in the areas of present-day Gabon and Chad. He was killed while on an expedition to Lake Chad.

== Biography ==
Crampel was born in Nancy.

After finishing his studies in humanities, he was hired as a private secretary by Pierre Savorgnan de Brazza (1852–1905), who in August 1888, entrusted Crampel with exploring the Ogooué north basin (mostly located in present-day Gabon). In the following months, Crampel mapped over 2000 km of routes and signed several treaties with local African chieftains.

In 1890 the Comité de l'Afrique française tasked him with an expedition to Lake Chad. In September he disembarked at Bangui on the Ubangi River, the last outpost of French occupation, and trekked upcountry northward. Several months later he reached the remote region of Dar al Kuti, roughly 500 km from the Ubangi (between 9 and 10 degrees North latitude). On 9 April 1891, Crampel and a number of men in his caravan were killed there.

== Written works involving Paul Crampel ==
- Au pays des M'Fans voyage d'exploration de M. Paul Crampel dans le nord du Congo francais, 1888, Paul Crampel (1890) pdf
- Itineraires au nord de l'Ogooué dans les bassins de l'Ivindo, du Djah et du Ntem, Paul Crampel (1890)
- A la conquête du Tchad, Harry Alis (alias of journalist Jules-Hippolyte Percher (1857–1895), a friend of Paul Crampel)
- Un explorateur du centre de l'Afrique: Paul Crampel, 1864–1891, Pierre Kalck

== See also ==
- List of unsolved murders
