= Sultanate of Dar Runga =

- ?–1890
- Status: Vassal state of the Wadai Empire
- Common languages: Arabic, Runga and other Nilo-Saharan languages
- Religion: Islam (official)
- Government: Monarchy
- Historical era: Late Modern Period
  - Established: ?
  - Dar al-Kuti is established as a vassal state: 1830
  - Rabih az-Zubayr invasion and annexation to Dar al-Kuti: 1890
  - Disestablished: 1890
Succeeded by
Dar al-Kuti

Dar Runga was a sultanate in what is today southern Chad. It was a tributary state of the Ouaddai Empire. It was conquered by Rabih az-Zubayr in 1890 and annexed to its former vassal, the sultanate of Dar al Kuti.
