= Dar al Kuti =

Historic country in Africa

Sultanate of Dar al Kuti دار الكوتي
- 1830–1911
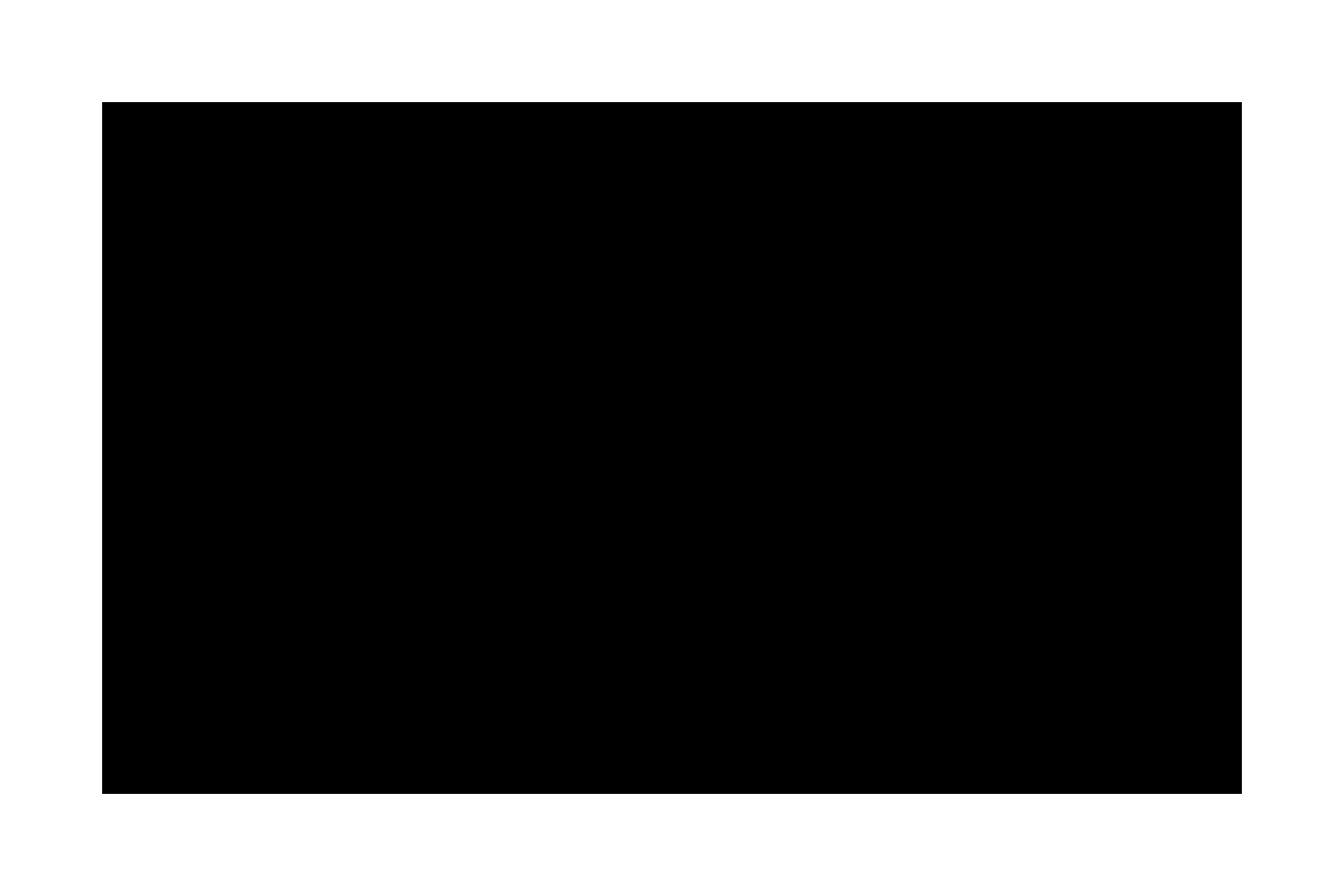
- Flag

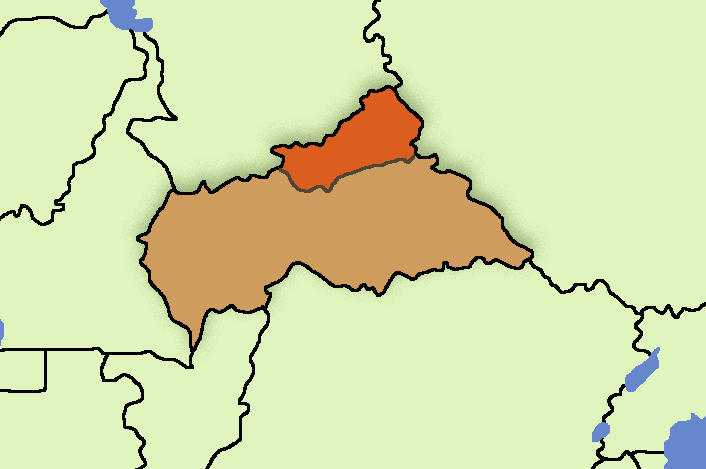
- Approximate location of Dar al-Kuti with modern borders.
- Status: Vassal state of Dar Runga (1830–1890); Vassal state of Rabih az-Zubayr (1890–1897)
- Capital: Chá (1830–1894); N'Délé (1894–1911)
- Common languages: Arabic, various Nilo-Saharan languages
- Religion: Islam (official), Traditional African religion
- Government: Monarchy
- Sheikh, emir
  - 1830–1870: Djougoultoum
  - 1870–1890: Kobur
  - 1890-1911: Muhammad al-Sanussi
- Historical era: Late Modern Period
  - Established: 1830
  - Rabih az-Zubayr deposes Kobur in favour of al-Sanussi: 1890
  - Disestablished: 1911
  - Final surrender of Kamun, Senussi's son: 1912
Preceded by	Succeeded by
Dar Runga	French Equatorial Africa
- Today part of: Central African Republic; Chad

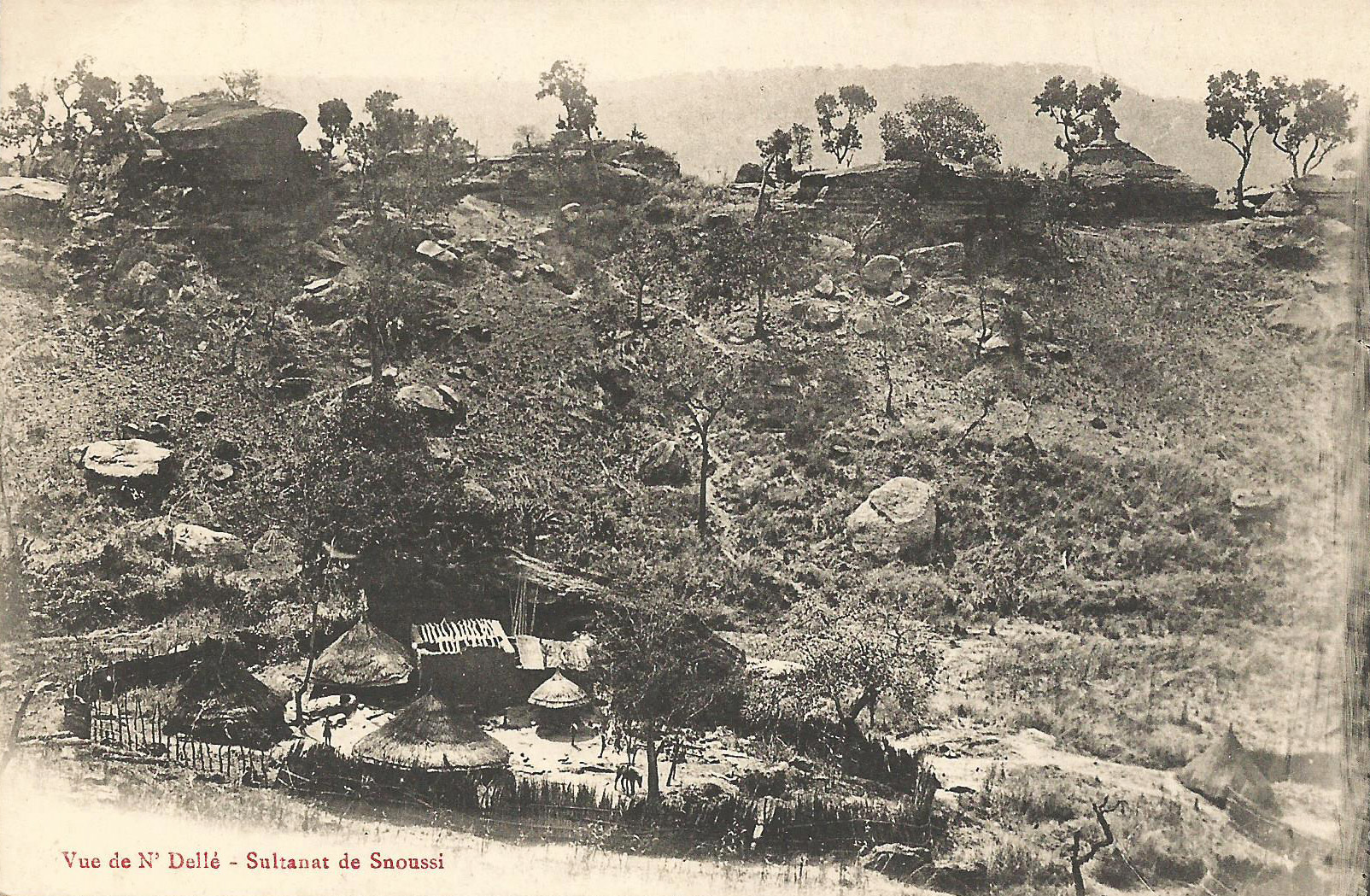
A settlement in Dar al Kuti.

Dar al Kuti ('Dar al-Kuri' in some sources) was an Islamic state in the center and northwest of the present Central African Republic which existed from around 1830 until 17 December 1912. From around 1800 the name Dar al-Kuti was given to a stretch of the frontier to the southwest of Wadai, a sultanate in the region of Lake Chad. The term "dar" signifies "abode" in Arabic, while the term "kuti" in the local language denotes a forest or densely-wooded area.

== History ==
=== Origins and the rule of Djougoultoum (c.1830-1870) ===
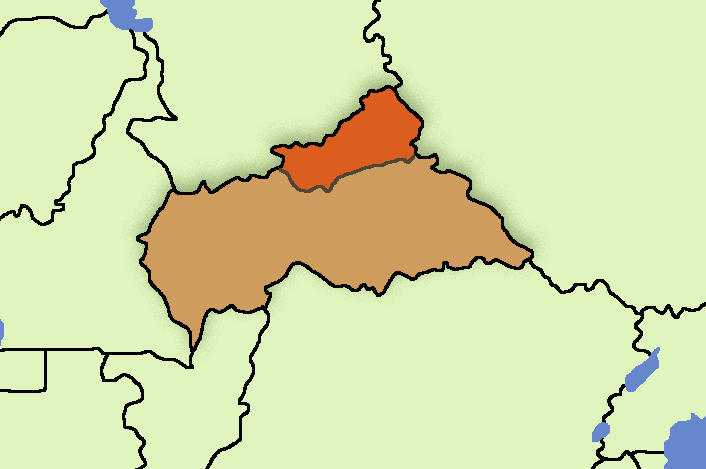
The approximate borders of the Sultanate in 1896, in orange, inside of modern Central African Republic.

Both Wadai and its western neighbour the Sultanate of Baguirmi (1522-1897) sent slaving expeditions into the lands of the Sara, a Nilotic people to the south of Chad. By the early nineteenth century these expeditions had reached into the present day Central African Republic. At this time, the ruler of Baguirmi was the Mbang Bourgomanda, who had two sons, Abd el-Kader and Djougoultoum. When Abd el-Kader became sultan in 1826, he sought to distance his brother from power, and Djougoultoum fled to Wadai.

The Kalak (sultan) of Wadai sent Djougoultoum to the Dar Runga, governed by a sultan who was his tributary. Dar Runga was a military frontier between the Azoum and Aouk rivers. Djougoultoum married Fatme, daughter of Boker, the sultan of Dar Runga, and in 1830 settled in a still more southerly frontier region, Bilad al-Kuti, a zone for slave raiding south of the river Aouk. Bilad al-Kuti, or Dar al-Kuti, became a tributary region of Dar Runga, which in turn remained a tributary of Wadai.

Chá, on the river Diangara, a tributary of the Aouk, became the capital of this new province and Djougoultoum was appointed by Wadai as governor of Dar al-Kuti, which enjoyed a high degree of independence. The dates for his reign (1830-1870) are probably not exact, but he was the first governor of Dar al-Kuti. Its territory comprised fourteen villages (probably only its most significant settlements) and could be traversed in two days from east to west, indicating that it was small.

=== The rule of Kobur (c.1870-1890) ===
In the late 1860s or early 1870s, a respected trader and faqih named Kobur was made governor of Dar al-Kuti (according to some sources he was the son of Djougoultoum). His wealth and power probably derived from the ivory trade. While he was governor, groups of Wadai horsemen would appear in Dar al-Kuti from time to time to gather tribute and collect slaves from the regions of the Nduka and Banda peoples, which bordered on Kobur's domain. Kobur was careful to maintain good relations both with the larger Muslim realms to the north, as well as with his non-Muslim neighbours, the Nduka. Dar al-Kuti took part in the slave trade to a limited extent, but large-scale raids did not take place in the time of Kobur.

The greatest threat to Dar al-Kuti was posed by Rabih az-Zubayr, a Sudanese commander and slave trader who was active in the central and northeastern regions of the modern Central African Republic, capturing many of the Banda people. In 1874 Rabih's lieutenants seized Kobur's capital, Chá, and the following year he was attacked on his other flank by the Banda. In 1880 Rabih agreed to stop his attacks on Dar al-Kuti in return for free passage across its lands to attack the Banda.

=== The rule of Muhammad al-Sanusi (1890–1911) ===
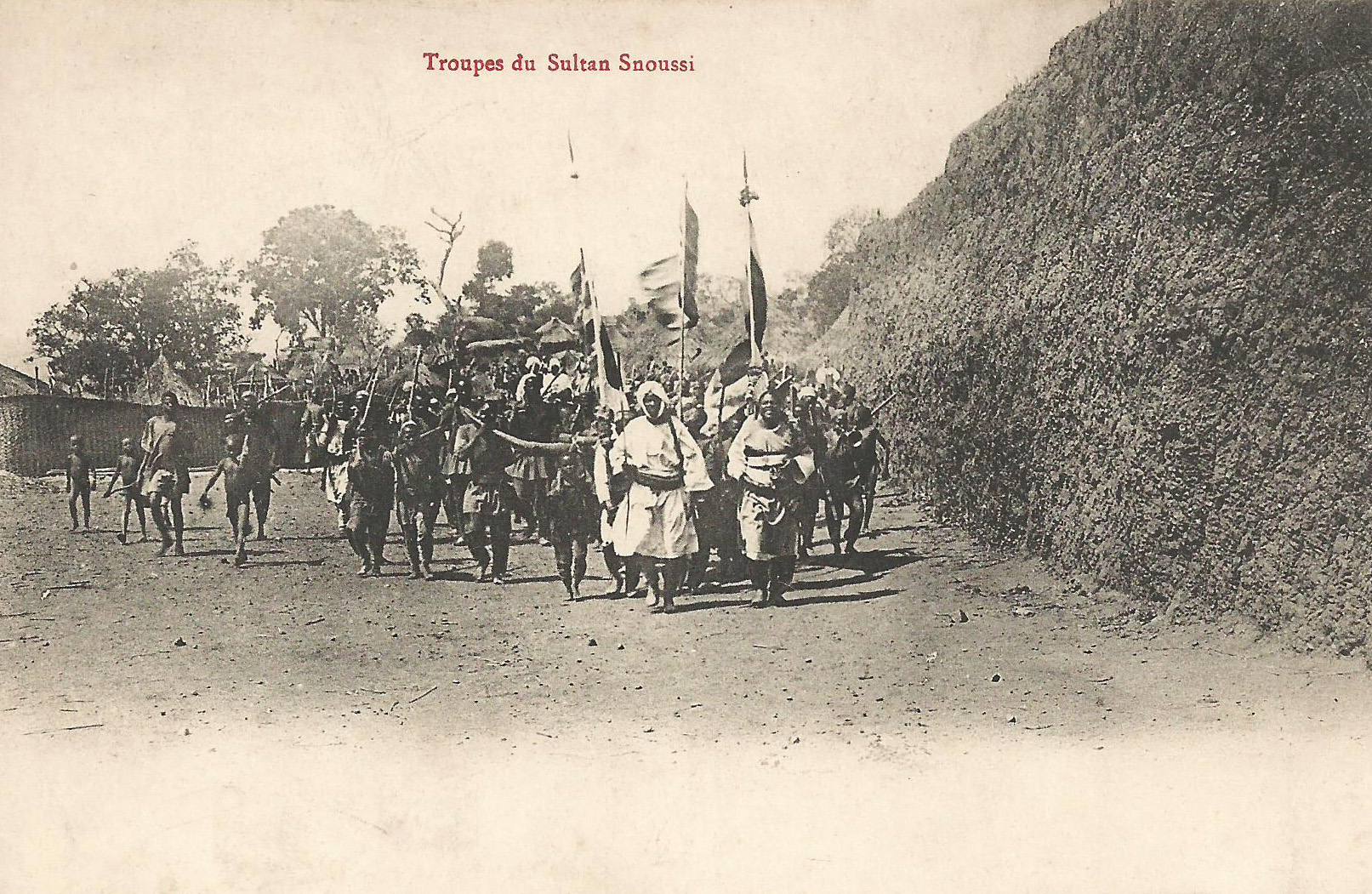
Muhammad al-Sanusi rallying his troops by the fortified tata at N'Délé.

In 1890, seeking a more compliant protégé, Rabih deposed Kobur and installed Kobur's nephew Muhammad al-Sanussi as sheikh of both Dar al-Kuti and Dar Runga, Al-Sanussi, born around 1850 in Wadai, was a member of the Sanusiyya order. His daughter Khadija was married to Rabih's son Fadlallah. In the years that followed, Rabih continued to consolidate and expand Sanussi's authority. Any potential threats to his rule from Kobur were neutralised and Dar al-Kuti's sphere of influence expanded to include much of the modern Central African Republic. Dar al-Kuti had been a tributary of Wadai before 1890, and its former overlords did not accept Rabih's seizure of control without resistance. In October 1894 the aguid of Wadai, Cherfeddine, attacked and destroyed Chá, the capital, forcing Sanussi to maintain an itinerant court for two years until he eventually founded a new fortified settlement, or tata, at N'Délé.

In the 1890s Dar al-Kuti began to come under pressure from France. Various explorers ventured into this part of Africa, seeking routes to link the basins of the Ubangi and Shari Rivers. A number of them, including Léon de Poumayrac and fr:Alfred Fourneau, reached areas close to Dar al-Kuti, and in 1891 Paul Crampel was killed together with his companions by Sanussi.

On 28 August 1897, Sanussi agreed to the establishment of a French protectorate over Dar al-Kuti through a treaty of trade and alliance signed by Mohammed el-Sanussi and Émile Gentil. The treaty was revised twice, on 18 February 1903 and 26 January 1908, but Dar al-Kuti retained its independence until the death of Sanussi on 12 January 1911. He left behind at least two sons, Kamun, who took the throne, and Kangaya, as well as the daughter, Hadia, who had married Fadlallah.

=== French annexation ===
The French decided the time had come to take most of Dar al-Kuti under direct control. Kamun fled east to Ouanda Djallé, and continued resisting French forces until 17 December 1912, when Ouanda Djallé fell to Captain Souclier and Kamun went into exile in Sudan. After absorption into the French colonial territory of Ubangi-Shari, Dar al-Kuti became an administrative division (circonscription) and, between 1937 and 1946, a département. Since 1946 the region has been known as the Autonomous District of N'Délé (1946-1961), the Autonomous Prefecture of N'Délé (1961-1964), and, after 1964, as the Prefecture of Bamingui-Bangoran.

== See also ==
- Republic of Logone

== Bibliography ==
- Boucher, Edmond AJ, Monographie du Dar-Kouti-Oriental, 1934.
- Cordell, Denis D, Dar al-Kuti and the Last Years of the Trans-Saharan Slave Trade, University of Wisconsin Press, Madison, WI, EUA, 1985.
- Dampierre, Eric de, Un ancien royaume Bandia du Haut-Oubangui, Plon, París, 1967.
- Kalck, Pierre, Central African Republic, Praeger Publishers Inc, New York, 1971.
- Kalck, Pierre, Un explorateur du centre de l'Afrique, Paul Crampel (1864-1891), El Harmattan, París, 1993.
