= Ouara =

Ouara وارا
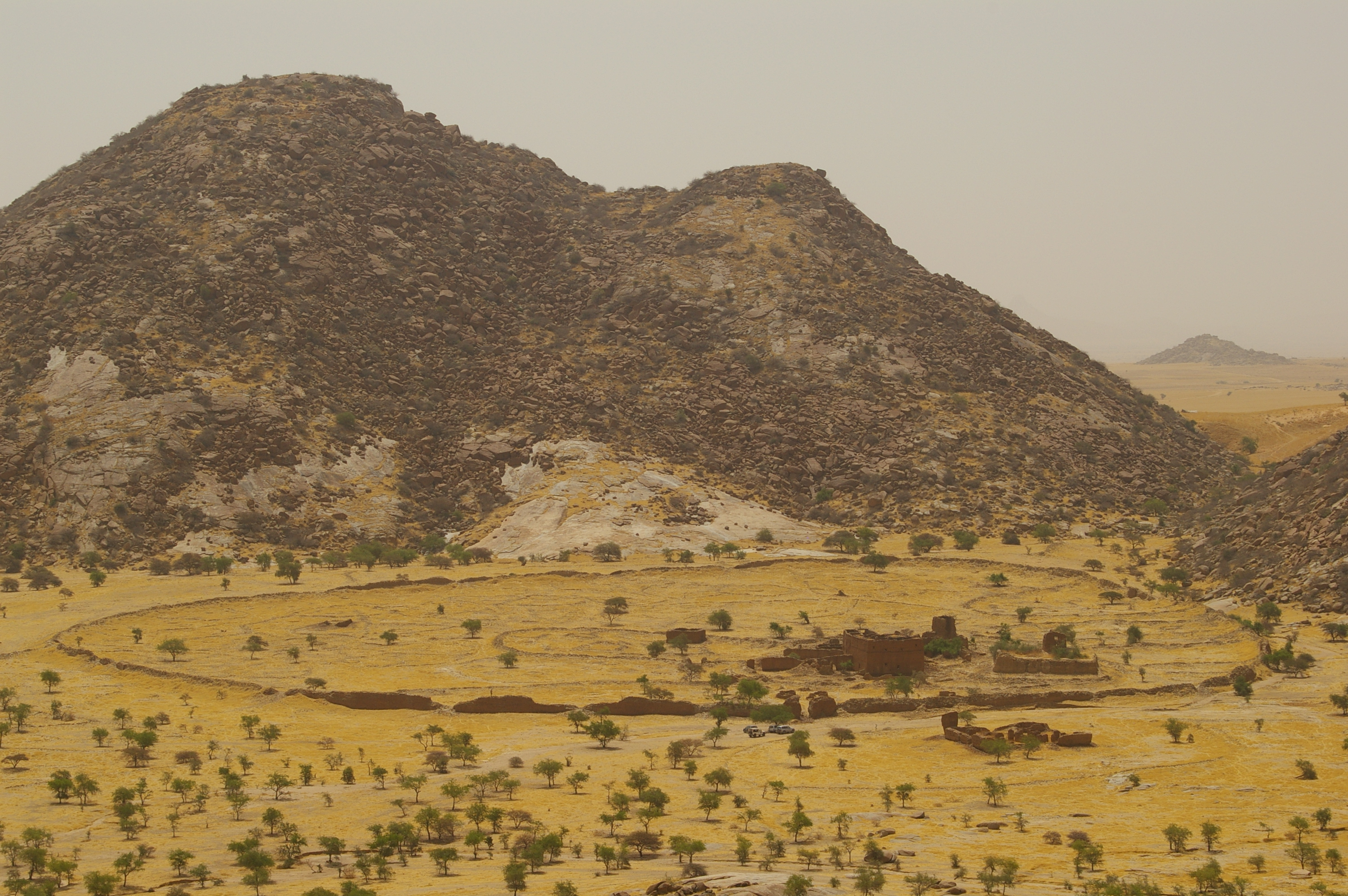
- The ruins of Ouara

- Location in Chad
- Coordinates: 14°13′36″N 20°40′20″E
- Country: Chad
- Region: Ouaddai
- Department: Oura Department
- Time zone: +1

Ouara (or Wara, Arabic: وارا) is the former capital of the Ouaddai Empire lying near Abéché in eastern Chad. It has been deserted since its wells went dry in the 19th century. Situated between hills, it is still home to a ruined palace, mosque and city wall. These ruins were added to the UNESCO World Heritage Tentative List on July 21, 2005, in the cultural category.
