= Dud Murra of Wadai =

Last independent ruler of the Wadai Empire

Dud Murra
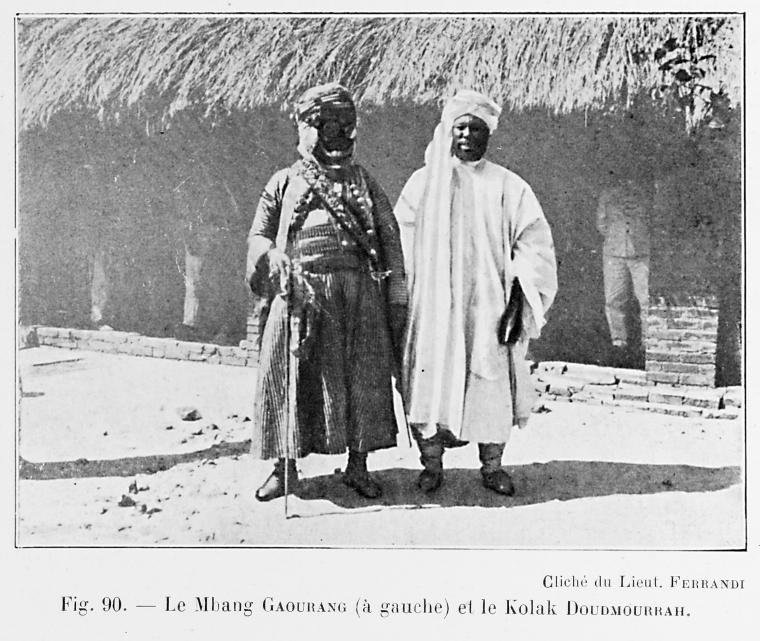
- Gaourang II of Bagirmi (left) with Dud Murra (right)

Kolak of Wadai
- In office November 1901 – 12 June 1909
- Preceded by: Ahmad al-Ghazali
- Succeeded by: Adam Asil

Personal details
- Born: Muhammad Salih bin Yusuf c. 1881
- Died: September 1927 (aged 45–46)
- Parent: Yusuf II

Muhammad Salih bin Yusuf, known as Dud Murra or Dudmurrah ("the Lion of Murra"), was the last independent ruler, or kolak, of the Wadai Empire. He allied with the Sanusi, powerful traders of the eastern Sahara, and with the Sultan of Darfur to resist French aggression in the eastern Sahel, but was defeated. His sultanate was incorporated in the French military territory of Chad.

== Early years ==
Muhammad Salih bin Yusuf, Dud Murra, was the son of Yusuf ibn Muhammad Sharif, who ruled Wadai from his capital of Abéché (Abeshr) from 1874 to 1898. Yusuf's reign was a period of prosperity and stability. In 1898 a force of Anglo-Egyptian troops reconquered the Sudan and defeated the Mahdist forces at Omdurman, near Khartoum. They reestablished the sultanate of Darfur to the east of Wadai under Ali Dinar, a relatively effective ruler. When the Kolak Yusuf of Wadai died in 1898 there was a struggle for the succession in which Dud Murra was the candidate of the Sanusi. However, Ahmad al-Ghazali, sponsored by Ali Dinar, gained the throne.

In November 1901 Dud Murra deposed Ahmed al-Ghazali with the aid of the Sanusi. Muhammad al-Mahdi as-Senussi, the Sanusi leader, died in January 1902, but the Sanusi remained strong in their base of Kufra, midway between Al-Fasher in Darfur and the Mediterranean. Ahmed al-Ghazali was captured in June 1902, blinded and then executed, making Dud Murra the undisputed ruler. Dud Murra rewarded the Sanusiyya by letting them trade freely. It was said of him, "If a merchant is killed the Sultan is sure to revenge him, and should the merchant kill a native the Sultan himself would pay the blood money".

Early in his reign Muhammad Salih Dud Murra had to deal with French aggression from the west. The French had defeated and killed the Sudanese warlord Rabih az-Zubayr, who had taken control of the former Bornu Empire in the west of the Lake Chad region, in the Battle of Kousséri on 22 April 1900. The French were now advancing eastward. Their goal was to defeat the Sanusiya, powerful traders in the eastern Sahara, and to replace local rulers who opposed them with puppets. The French expanded their military camel corps and launched attacks on the Sanusi zawaya posts.

== Loss of Abéché ==
Wadai sultanate east of Lake Chad around 1890, from an American map

In 1906 the French initiated hostilities against Wadai. The ruler of Dar Sila took advantage of the situation to encroach on the Wadai monopoly of ivory from Dar Kibet. This almost led to war between Dar Sila and Wadai. The French advanced eastward methodically, setting up fortified posts along their route, and were within 100 miles (160 km) of Abéché by 1907. In 1908 there were two battles between the forces of Wadai and the French led by Captain Jérusalemy, one on 29 May at Dokotchi and the other on 16 June at Djoua in which the governors of the Wadai provinces of Mahamid and Debaba were killed. In 1908 the French claimed the sultanates of Dar Tama and Dar Masalit as part of Wadai, and tried to establish friendly relations with the sultanate of Dar Gimr.

Captain Jean-Joseph Fiegenschuh entered Abéché on 12 June 1909 with a force of 180 men and two cannons. The next day he proclaimed that Wadai was a French territory. The French installed Dud Murra's cousin Adam Asil as puppet sultan. Asil had fled from Abéché because Dud Murra meant to blind him in punishment for an attempted coup. The French began to subjugate the Wadai vassal states. The Daju Sultan of Dar Sila sent a letter to Fort Lamy offering his submission directly, in a move to break loose from Wadai. He did this before paying homage to the puppet king Adam Asil and before being visited at his capital of Goz Beïda by a French lieutenant. Despite this, the French treated Dar Sila as a Wadai dependency.

== Further struggles with the French ==
Dud Murra moved north to Kapka, where he spent the next ten months gathering a force of loyal subjects and Sanusi allies. The Sanusi gave him their full support. The French made an "inspection tour" into Dar Masalit where they were opposed by the combined followers of Sultan Taj ad-Din of Masalit and of Dud Murra. On 4 January 1910 Fiegenschuh and his force were massacred at Wadi Kadja in Dar Massalit That year Ali Dinar, Dud Murra and Sultan Taj el-Din of Dar Masalit invaded Dar Tama and Dar Gimr and replaced the French puppet rulers with their own. (Note: Disputes over the border between the French and British spheres of influence continued until a border settlement was made in 1924.)

Ali Dinar was less than wholehearted in supporting Dud Murra, but by April 1910 Dud Murra and Ali Dinar both had powerful armies and planned to act together to defeat the French.

However, Ali Dinar was defeated on 7 April 1910 and Dud Murra was defeated on 19 April 1910 in separate battles.

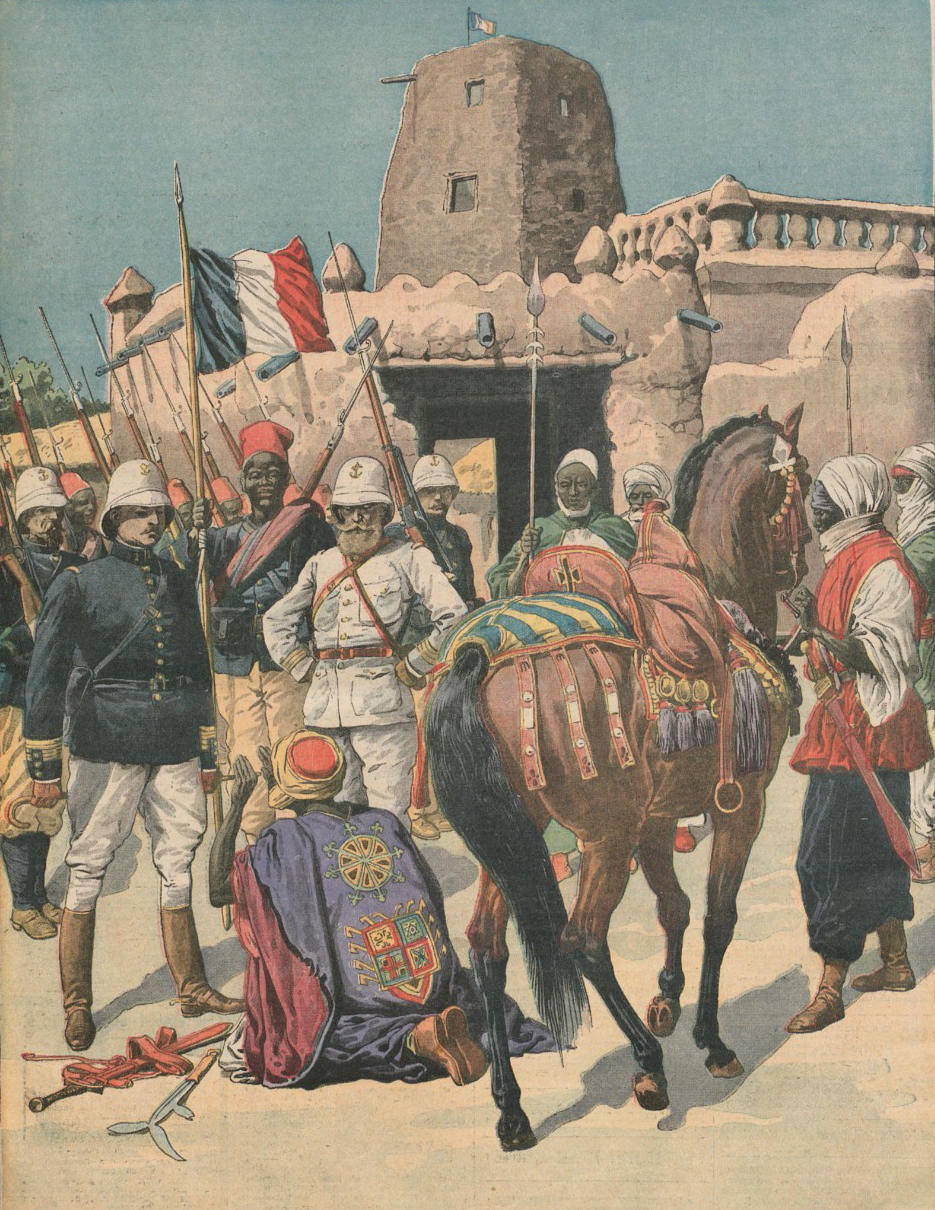
The submission of Dud Murra on a French newspaper

Dud Murra retreated south into Dar Masalit after his defeat at Kapka, and many refugees from Wadai fled to Darfur. The French mounted punitive expeditions and put down a major rebellion in the east of Wadai. Commander Joseph Édouard Maillard, head of the Chad Territory forces, advanced with 300 men into Massalit. On 8 November 1910 5,000 of Dud Murra's cavalry and troops of Sultan Tadj ed-Din surrounded and defeated Maillard at Dorothe.

The French called on Colonel Victor Emmanuel Largeau, who had commanded in Chad in 1902–04, to retrieve the situation. In January 1911 the French invaded Dar Masalit, where they won several battles and destroyed Darjil, the capital. Ali Dinar took advantage of this distraction to raid and loot Dar Tama. Dud Murra advanced towards Abéché with an escort from Masalit, but was defeated by the French at Shekoiung, two days away. He returned to Endoka's base at Mugurni. Afraid that the French would invade Dar Masalit again, the sultan Endoka, son of Abbakr, expelled Dud Murra. Dud Murra surrendered to the French in October 1911. Asil was dethroned by the French in 1911 after a major revolt in Wadai in which he was suspected of conspiracy. The French placed the region under direct colonial rule. Dud Murra was exiled. A 1924 report said that Dud Murra was then a political prisoner at large in Fort-Lamy, and was receiving a French government pension. (Note: A report of the Nyala Uprising in southern Darfur in September 1921 notes that Malik Dud Murra, the main leader of the Masalit, was in prison at the time, and this may have been a factor in the willingness of the Masalit to participate in the rising. This appears to be a different person.)

== Sources ==
- Azevedo, M. J. (2005-10-11), The Roots of Violence: A History of War in Chad, Routledge, ISBN 978-1-135-30081-4
- Calkins, Sandra; Ille, Enrico (2014-10-21), Emerging Orders in the Sudans, Langaa RPCIG, ISBN 978-9956-792-16-0
- Daly, M. W. (2010-05-24), Darfur's Sorrow: The Forgotten History of a Humanitarian Disaster, Cambridge University Press, ISBN 978-0-521-19174-6
- Davies, R. (1924), "The Masalit Sultanat", Sudan Notes and Records, 7 (2): 49–62, JSTOR 41715557
- Kapteijns, Lidwien (1983), "Dār Silā, the Sultanate in Precolonial Times, 1870-1916" (PDF), Cahiers d'études africaines, 23 (92): 447–470, doi:10.3406/cea.1983.2239
- Kapteijns, L. (1984), "The Organization of Exchange in Pre-Colonial Western Dar Fur" (PDF), Recent Dutch and Belgian research on the African state, Leiden, Netheriands: African Studies Centre
- Lobban, Richard A. Jr.; Dalton, Christopher H. (2014-04-17), Libya: History and Revolution, ABC-CLIO, ISBN 978-1-4408-2885-0
- Shillington, Kevin (2013-07-04), Encyclopedia of African History 3-Volume Set, Routledge, ISBN 978-1-135-45669-6
- Spaulding, Jay; Kapteijns, Lidwien (2011-08-31), An Islamic Alliance: Ali Dinar and the Sanusiyya, 1906–1916, Northwestern University Press, ISBN 978-0-8101-2809-5
- Vaughan, Chris (2015), Darfur: Colonial Violence, Sultanic Legacies and Local Politics, 1916-1956, Boydell & Brewer, ISBN 978-1-84701-111-4
- Willemse, Karin (2007-11-27), One Foot in Heaven: Narratives on Gender and Islam in Darfur, West-Sudan, BRILL, ISBN 978-90-474-2298-3
