= Tunjur people =

African ethnic group of Chad and Sudan

The Tunjur (or Tungur) people are a Sunni Muslim ethnic group living in eastern Chad and western Sudan. In the 21st century, their numbers have been estimated at 175,000 people.

== History ==
Based on linguistic and archaeological evidence, the ethnic ancestry of the Tunjur people has been argued by contemporary archaeologist Claude Rilly to go back to Christian Nubia. Thus, Rilly claims that the name Tunjur goes back to the town of Dongola (Tungul or Old Dongola, where the Tungur name is derived from Tungul, the old name of Dongola) in Nubia. According to their own oral traditions and other scholars, they are of Arab descent, whose ancestors migrated from the Arabian Peninsula to central Sudan either by way of North Africa and Tunis or by way of Nubia. Thus, the 19th century German explorer Gustav Nachtigal claimed they resemble Arabs in features and behaviour, but this impression has been refuted by modern scholars.

Although a minority, the Tunjur became the ruling class of Darfur and Wadai in the 13th century by peacefully taking power from the Daju. In the 16th century, they were overthrown by an Arab group that founded the Keira dynasty, and later merged with the Fur people. According to the local legends of the Fur people, Shau Dorshid, the last ruler of the Tunjur, was “driven out by his own people because he compelled his subjects to dig wells in the high rocky regions and to undertake the ardeous and useless task of levelling the Mail mountain peak, on the summit of which he wanted to establish his residence." His capital was at the site of Ain Farah, where specimens of Christian iconography were found.

Around the middle of the 17th century, the Tunjur people were expelled from the Islamic Wadai empire by Abd-el-Kerim of the Bargo people, and the Bargo controlled the slave supply caravans to the north. The Tunjur then migrated west to their current location. Thereafter, they converted to Maliki fiqh of Sunni Islam.

== Society ==
The Tunjur are farmers and live closely associated with the Fur. Their own Tunjur language has become extinct, they now speak Chadian Arabic, Fur, or Bari as their first language.

== Contemporary issues ==
Following the Darfur conflict in February 2003, like the Fur and the Zaghawa, many Tunjur have been affected by fighting and persecution. A number of Tunjur have taken part in the fight against the Sudanese government under the banners of the Sudan Liberation Movement (SLM).

== See also ==
- History of Darfur
- Ouaddai Empire
- Tunjur kingdom
