= Wadai Sultanate =

Central African sultanate from 1501 to 1912

Sultanate of Wadai سلطنة وداي
- 1635–1912
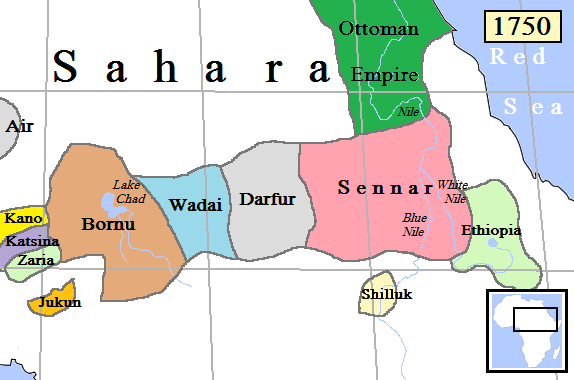
- Wadai and surrounding states in 1750.
- Status: State from 1635-1912; Currently a non-sovereign monarchy within Chad
- Capital: Ouara (1635–1850); Abeche (1850–1911)
- Common languages: Maba, Chadian Arabic, Tunjur, Fur
- Religion: Islam (official), Traditional African religion
- Government: Monarchy
- Kolak
  - 1635–1637: Abd al-Karim
  - 1902–1909: Dud Murra
  - 1909–1912: Adam Asil
  - 2019–present: Cherif Abdelhadi Mahdi
- Historical era: Early modern period
  - Abd al-Karim overthrows the Tunjur King Daud: 1635
  - French conquest: 1912
  - Wadai reconstituted under French suzerainty: 1935
| Preceded by | Succeeded by |
| Tunjur kingdom; Sultanate of Darfur | French Equatorial Africa |
- Today part of: Central African Republic; Chad; Sudan

The Wadai Sultanate (Note: Arabic: سلطنة وداي Saltanat Waday, French: royaume du Ouaddaï, Fur: Burgu or Birgu;) or Wadai Empire (Note: Sometimes referred to as the Maba Sultanate (French: Sultanat Maba).) (1635–1912) was an African sultanate located to the east of Lake Chad in present-day Chad and the Central African Republic. It emerged in the seventeenth century under the leadership of the first sultan, Abd al-Karim, who overthrew the ruling Tunjur people of the area. It bordered the Sultanate of Darfur and the Sultanate of Baguirmi.

Despite there being an abundancy of sources available on the sultanate, a comprehensive historical study is yet to be undertaken about Wadai.

== History ==
=== Origins ===
Prior to the 1630s, the region was ruled by the Tunjur kingdom, established around the 15th century. Tunjur oral traditions say that the founder of the Tunjur kingdom in Darfur, Ahmad al-Ma'qur, had two sons called Ahmad Kanjar and Musa; Kanjar accordingly succeeded his father in Darfur and was the founder of the Kunjaara dynasty, while Musa went to Wadai and subjugated the region with the assistance of the Mahamid Arabs. McGregor wrote that many of the early heroes in tradition were later Islamised to strengthen the ruling dynasty's legitimacy.

In 1635, the Maba and other small groups in the region rallied to the Islamic banner of Abd al-Karim, who was descended from the Maba tribe noble family, and overthrew the ruling Tunjur dynasty, who at the time was led by a king named "Daud". Abd al-Karim secured and centralized his power in the area by marrying the Tunjur King Daud's daughter, Meiram Aisa, and then forming other marriage pacts with local dynasties and tribes, such as the Masalit and Dajo tribes. Abd al-Karim built his capital at Wara and founded the Kolak dynasty, and made Islam the state religion despite most commoners following traditional religions.

After Abd al-Karim's death, Wadai's history was marked by civil wars and hostile relations with Bornu and Darfur. Wadai's wealth came from slave trading and the procurement of slaves in raids. Throughout the 17th century, Wadai was a tributary of the Darfur, however towards the end of the century kolak Ya'qub Arus refused to pay tribute, securing Wadai's independence, likely owing to Wadai's growth in economic and military power. Darfur attacked Wadai but was defeated. Under Ya'qub's rule Wadai suffered a terrible drought.

Ya'qub's son, Joda, expanded the state southwards and into the Tunjur heartland of Mondo.

=== Apogee ===
After 1804, during the reign of Muhammad Sabun (1804 – c. 1815), the Sultanate of Wadai began to expand its power as it profited considerably from its strategic position astride the trans-Saharan trade routes. In 1805 Wadai conquered Bagirmi, killed its ruler, and captured and sold 20,000 people into slavery. Bagirmi was reduced to a tributary. Sabun further extended his rule south to Dar Sila and Dar Runga. Around 1809/10 a new trade route to the north was found by a traveller from Jala, linking Ennedi, Kufra and Jalu-Awjila to Benghazi, and Sabun outfitted royal caravans to take advantage of it. This freed Wadai from being economically dependent on Bornu and Darfur. He began minting his own coinage and imported chain mail, moukhalas, and military advisers from North Africa, along with using the wealth generated from the trade of exotic animals like giraffes, lions, antelopes and camels, with there also being the trade of elephants and their ivory to fill the state's treasury. Sabun's death was followed by a period of intense instability, seeing six sultans in the 1820s and early 1830s, and Darfur took advantage of a disputed political succession in 1838 to put its own candidate (Muhammad al-Sharif) in power in return for tribute.

This did not last, and Sharif quickly regained Wadai's independence. Sharif conducted various military campaigns, sacking Bornu's capital (Kukawa) in 1846 and enforcing Bagirmi's tributary status. Darfur and Wadai's relations degenerated into raiding and counter-raiding. At Mecca, Sharif had met the founder of the Senussi Islamic brotherhood Muhammad ibn Ali as-Senussi, his movement being strong among the inhabitants of Cyrenaica (in present-day Libya). Sharif made Abéché the capital and closely controlled Senussi merchants, whose leaders controlled the towns of Jalu and Kufra along the recently found trade route.

Sharif's son, Ali ibn Muhammad Sharif, expanded economic and religious relations with the Senussi, as they became close allies. Both Sultan Ali's and his successor's reigns (Yusuf ibn Muhammad Sharif) enjoyed stability and prosperity. In the late 19th century, the region became unstable due to colonial expansion and the rise of al-Zubayr and the Mahdists, and Wadai and the Senussi's trade route from Wadai to Benghazi became the only reliable north–south route, with the Senussi ensuring security along it. This benefited Wadai greatly, and they expanded to control much of the Chad Basin, extending south to control Dar al Kuti. Wadai primarily exported slaves, ivory, and ostrich feathers, and imported firearms, manufactured goods, and rugs made of camel hair.

=== Decline ===
Armed with spear, bow and sword, and accompanied by deafening music, Wadai's forces held to the old methods- mass cavalry charges followed by the infantry. These were insufficient against modern weapons.

In 1898, Ali Dinar re-established the Darfur Sultanate at the same time as Sultan Yusuf's death, allowing him to interfere in the succession dispute. Darfur's candidate, Ahmad al-Ghazali, was crowned. Al-Ghazali was assassinated and replaced by the Senussi's candidate, Muhammad Salih (Yusuf's son), known as "Dud Murra" ("the lion of Murra"). He repaid the Senussi by allowing their merchants to trade freely. Rabih az-Zubayr conducted raids into Wadai. In 1906, the French initiated aggressive hostilities against Wadai, proposing Adam Asil as their puppet candidate. France invaded, and in 1909 they took Abéché. Dud Murra escaped to Kapka under the Senussi and Asil was made sultan. The French went on to conquer Wadai's vassals. Dud Murra continued to fight the French until his final defeat in 1910.

=== Colonial period and post-independence ===
The Wadai Sultanate was reconstituted under French suzerainty in 1935, with Muhammad Urada ibn Ibrahim becoming Kolak, or sultan.

It became a part of the independent Republic of Chad on the day of the country's independence in 1960. The sultanate continues to exist as a non-sovereign monarchy in Chad and its current Kolak since 2019 is Cherif Abdelhadi Mahdi. Unrelated to his predecessor who had been suspended, Mahdi was appointed by the Chadian government, which many viewed as interference in tradition. In January 2022 the government suspended the sultan's powers, igniting protests, however they were regranted in April 2023.

== Military ==
Under Abd al-Karim Sabun in the early 19th century, Wadai forces were equipped with chain mail and firearms. In the 1840s–50s, Wadai possessed 300 guns. The figure went upwards to 4000 flintlock muskets by the 1870s. Sultan Ali (1858–1874) hired Turkish and Egyptian mechanics to cast 12 bronze and small caliber cannons. These cannons lacked carriages and Gustav Nachtigal concluded in the 19th century that they were ineffective.

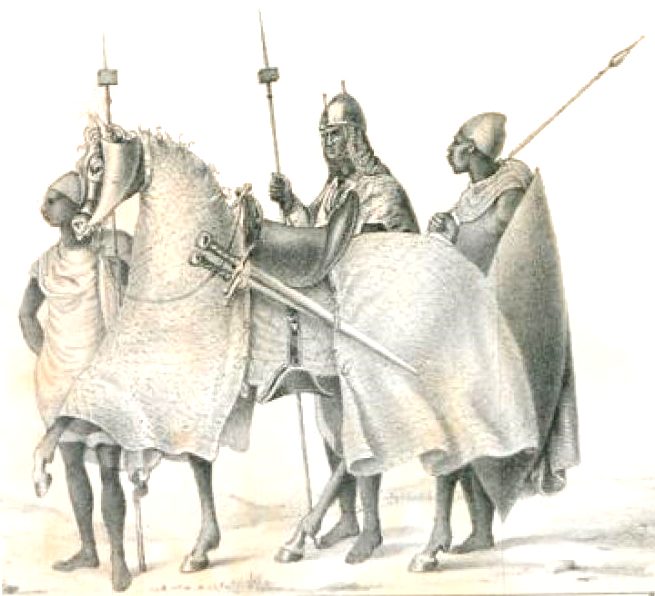
Wadai warriors in the mid 19th century

Wadai could deploy about 5–6000 cavalry of which a third of the cavalry men wore quilted armor whiles several more wore steel armor. Infantry could amount up to 56–60,000. The army was divided into two wings and a centre with the Sultan located behind the centre. The Sultan was protected by shield bearers who bore iron shields as well as "the troop of path makers" who cleared way for the Sultan's mobility through the bush. There existed the korayat who were mostly armed with lances. The aqid stood at the centre with royal slaves armed with muskets. Evidence exists for the use of explosives in warfare such as the siege of Massenya in 1870. Under directions from a man of Bornu, the army of Sultan Ali (1858–1874) buried a copper-coated basket full of gunpowder near the walls of Massenya. The basket was connected to the Wadai camp by gunpowder wrapped in cloth and further covered with dirt. The cloth was lit from its end leading to an explosion of the mine and the breach of Massenya's walls.

=== Tactics ===
Wadai forces were noted by French sources for their poor gun handling and insufficient training. In 1902, a French source from Dar Kuti states the Wadai army preferred to go on offence with cavalry and rely on firearms only for defense. Another source within that period documented that Wadai soldiers;

are deployed in one or more lines.... They advance under fire in dashes, from shelter to shelter. They shoot badly and only at short range, when they come within 400 metres from the enemy. Their shooting at any rate is only effective from this point, since they do not know how to make use of gunsights. This is, however, no great disadvantage for them, for extensive fields of fire are rare in the wooded country where we did battle with them.... They fight generally on foot and in order. They employ firearms and appear not to like hand-to-hand fighting.... On the defensive they adopt the same tactic as in attack, defending the terrain step by step, retiring from shelter to shelter...

Outflanking and encirclement were documented as a tactic of Wadai for the first time in 1908.

== Notable people ==
- Boyd Alexander (1873–1910), ornithologist, died in Wadai

== Gallery ==
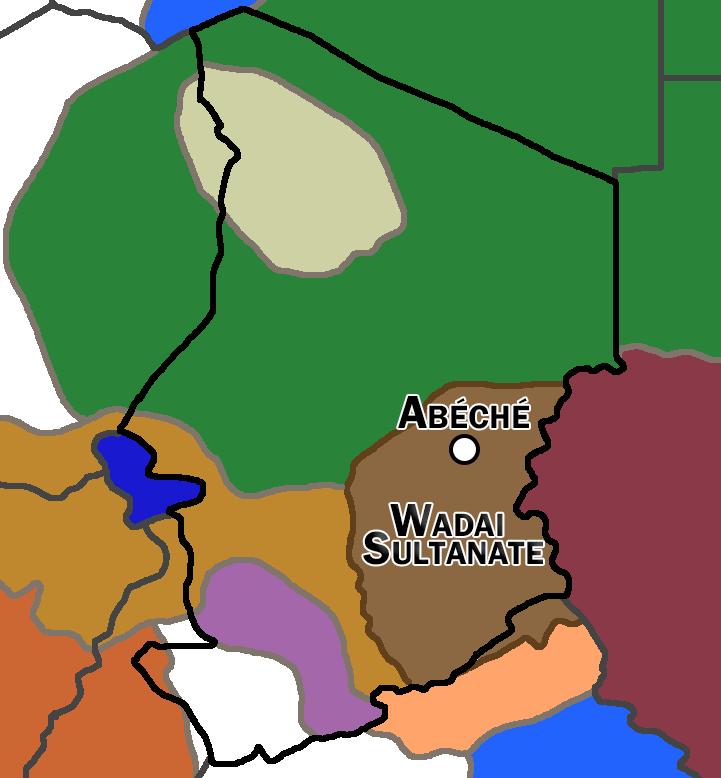
Wadai sultanate east of Lake Chad around 1890s

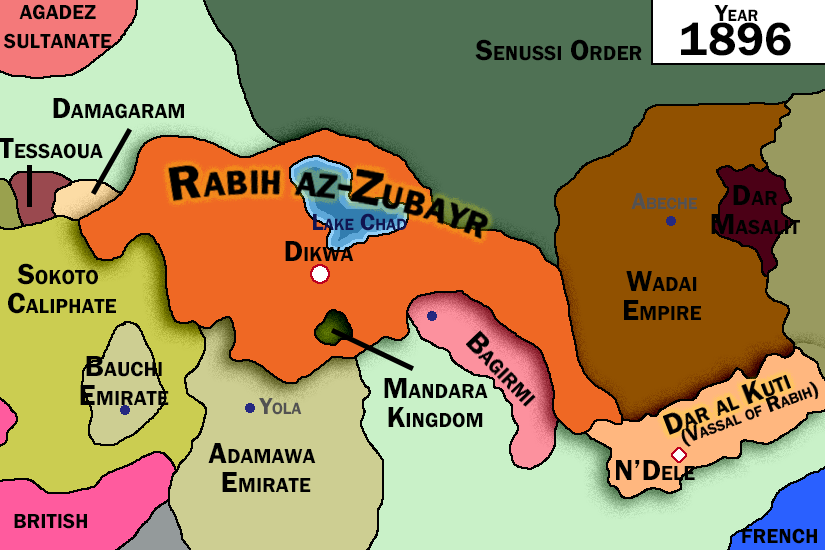
Wadai sultanate, Rabih az-Zubayr's empire, Senussi and other state entities in the region, 1896

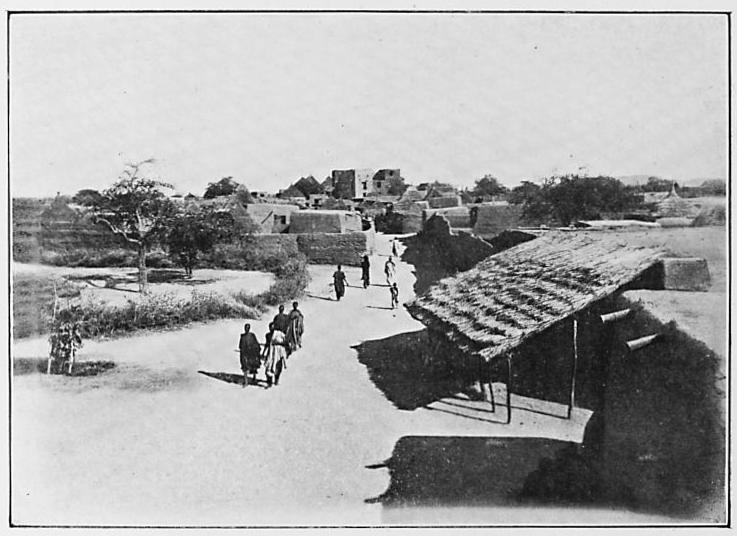
View of Abéché, with buildings constructed by the last sultan of Wadai, 'Asil Kolak. Photo after French annexation, c. 1918

== See also ==
- List of rulers of Wadai
- Dar al Kuti
