= Ain Farah =

Archaeological site in Sudan

Coordinates: 14.265713°N 24.316149°E

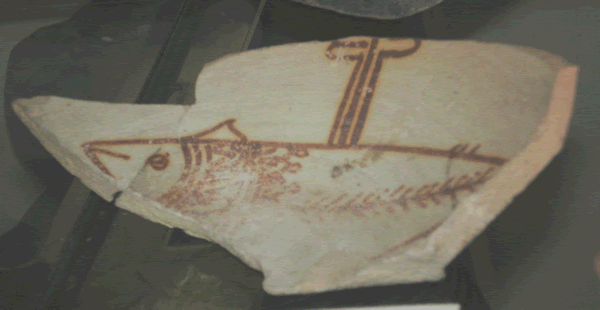
- Pottery from Ain Farah.
- Interactive map of Ain Farah
- Type: Archaeological site
- Location: Darfur
- Region: Western Sudan

Site notes
- Height: 100 m (330 ft)

Ain Farah is an archaeological site in Darfur in western Sudan. It was at one time the capital of the last Tunjur ruler, Shau Dorshid. It comprises large-scale area of stone and brick walls. It has been visited or described many times. Ain Farah moved one author to quote Macaulay – “like an eagle’s nest that hangs on the crest”, for it is built some 100 metres (330 ft) above a spring. It is characterised by several hundred brick and stone structures and terraces, and is defended by steep ridges and by a massive stone wall 3–4 kilometres (1.9–2.5 mi) long. There is a brick and stone edifice which appears to have served as a mosque, a large stone group which may have served as a public building, and a main group on the highest point of the ridge, described variously as a royal residence or military defence.

== Geography ==
It lies in the Furnung Hills some 130 kilometres (81 mi) northwest of El Fasher, and 600 miles (970 km) to the southwest of Dongola. The region is picturesque, with relatively fertile hills and spring sources. The archaeological site is situated close to a hill, about 100 metres (330 ft) above the source lakes. Date palms thrive in the lakes. From there, the access goes through a dry valley, which was previously secured in the back by a wall.

== Archaeology ==
Archaeological work is in early stages. A survey of a sample of houses and excavation of a grave was undertaken by Ibrahim Musa Mohammed (1986) during his survey of Darfur. The grave contained a flexed burial and over 200 iron beads, an ostrich eggshell necklace, a perforated cowrie shell, and iron jewellery. One of the corroded iron objects yielded a surprisingly early date (1500 +/- 200 bp, Q 3155), falling at least six and perhaps as many as eleven centuries before the likely time of the Tunjur; Mohammed interprets this as signifying a pre-Islamic presence and continuation into Islamic times. Christian Nubian pottery has been found at the site in the ruins of a brick-built monastery.
