= Sultanate of Dar Sila =

Dar Sila is the name of the wandering sultanate of the Dar Sila Daju, a multi-tribal ethnic group in Chad and Sudan. The number of the people in this group exceeds 50,000. They speak the Sila language, a Nilo-Saharan language. Most members of this ethnic group are Muslims.

== Location ==
Geographically, Dar Sila is located in southeastern territory of the Republic of Chad. It borders the Salamat Region of Chad in the southwest, Ouaddaï Region in the north and Assoungha Department of Chad in the southeast, and Darfur Region of Sudan to the east.

== Capital ==
Its capital is Goz Beïda which means in Arabic "the white sand dune".

== History ==
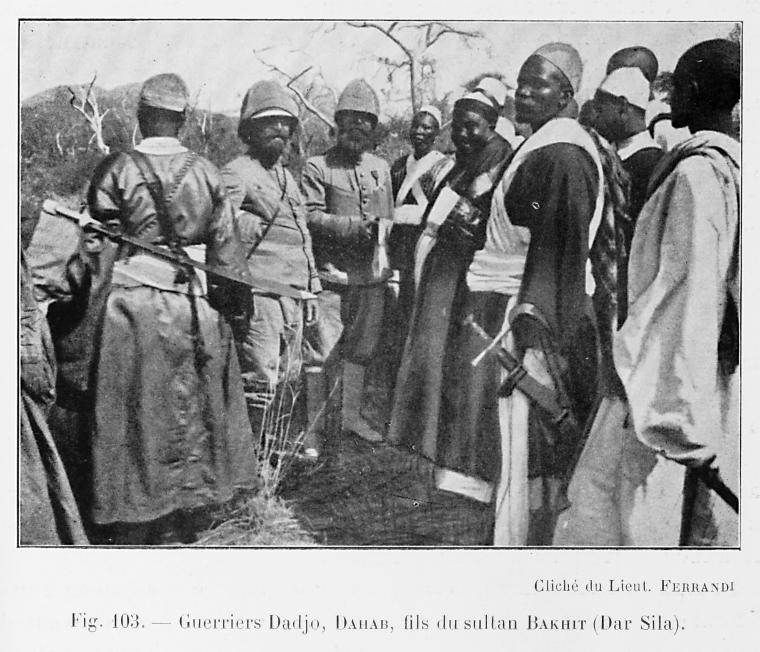
"Dadjo Warrior Dahab, son of sultan Bakhit (Dar Sila)". From L'Afrique Équatoriale Française: le pays, les habitants, la colonisation, les pouvoirs publics. Préf. de M. Merlin (published 1918).

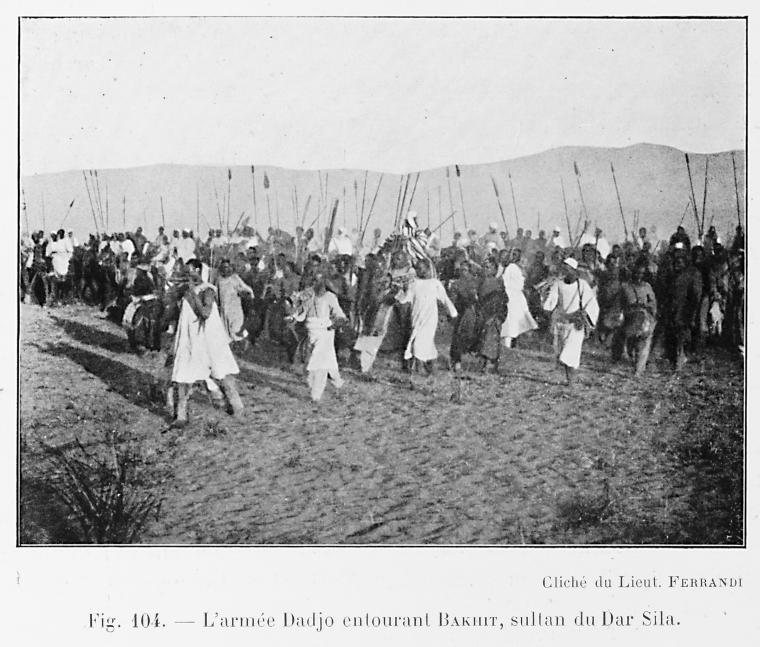
Dar Sila army

Its history goes back to Darfur when Sultan Omar Kasefroge, the last sultan of Darfur during the Daju rule of this area, who ordered removal of Jabel Daju in order to join the other 99 Daju Jabels. Consequently, many adults and warriors died.

== Chronology of sultans ==
Chronology of the Sultans of Dar Sila began with one of Kaseforge's sons, Sultan Ahmed al-Daj. He was followed by Sultan Ibrahim, Sultan Adam, Sultan Hassaballah, Sultan Habib, Sultan Shuaeib, Sultan Salih, Sultan Issa Hajar, Sultan Abd el-Karim, Sultan Abd el-Latif, Sultan El-Haj Bolad, Sultan Ishaq Abu-Risha, Sultan Mohamed Bakhit and his son Sultan Moustafa.

A brother of Sultan Ahmed el-Daj called Farouk "Ferne" refused to live in one sultanate in Dar Sila. Therefore he led his clans and soldiers to settle in Mongo where he established another small sultanate known as Dar Daju in the Guera Province to the west of Dar Sila.

== See also ==
- Chad
- Geography of Chad
