= List of sovereign states and dependent territories in Africa =

This is a list of sovereign states and dependent territories in Africa. It includes fully recognised states, states with limited or zero recognition, and dependent territories of both African and non-African states. It lists 56 sovereign states (54 of which are member states of the United Nations), two non-sovereign (dependent) territories of non-African sovereign states, and nine sub-national regions of non-African sovereign states. Malta and parts of France, Italy, Portugal, and Spain are located on the African continental plate, some considerably closer to the African mainland than the European mainland but, politically, are generally considered to be European by convention. Egypt, although extending into Asia through the Sinai Peninsula, is considered an African state.

== Sovereign states ==
=== Recognised sovereign states ===
The following 54 fully recognised states are all members of the United Nations and the African Union.

| Flag | Map | English short, formal names, and ISO | Domestic short and formal name(s) | Capital | Population 2021 | Area | Currency |
|---|---|---|---|---|---|---|---|
| Flag of Algeria | | Algeria People's Democratic Republic of Algeria DZA | Arabic: الجزائر—الجمهورية الجزائرية الديمقراطية الشعبية (Al Jazāʼir—Al Jumhūriyyah al Jazāʾiriyyah ad Dimuqrāṭiyyah ash Shaʾbiyyah) | Algiers Arabic: الجزائر (Al Jazā’ir) | 44,177,969 | 2,381,740 km^{2} (919,595 sq mi) | Algerian dinar |
| | | Angola Republic of Angola AGO | Portuguese: Angola—República de Angola | Luanda Portuguese: Luanda | 34,503,774 | 1,246,700 km^{2} (481,354 sq mi) | kwanza |
| | | Benin Republic of Benin BEN | French: Bénin—République du Bénin | Porto-Novo French: Porto-Novo | 12,996,895 | 112,622 km^{2} (43,484 sq mi) | CFA franc |
| | | Botswana Republic of Botswana BWA | English: Botswana—Republic of Botswana Tswana: Botswana—Lefatshe la Botswana | Gaborone English: Gaborone Tswana: Gaborone | 2,588,423 | 581,726 km^{2} (224,606 sq mi) | pula |
| | | Burkina Faso BFA | Mooré: Burkĩna Faso | Ouagadougou Mooré: Waogdgo | 22,100,683 | 274,000 km^{2} (105,792 sq mi) | CFA franc |
| | | Burundi Republic of Burundi BDI | French: Burundi—République du Burundi Kirundi: Burundi—Republika y'u Burundi | Gitega French: Gitega Kirundi: Gitega | 12,551,213 | 27,830 km^{2} (10,745 sq mi) | Burundi franc |
| | | Cabo Verde Republic of Cabo Verde CPV | Portuguese: Cabo Verde—República de Cabo Verde | Praia Portuguese: Praia | 587,925 | 4,033 km^{2} (1,557 sq mi) | Cape Verdean escudo |
| | | Cameroon Republic of Cameroon CMR | English: Cameroon—Republic of Cameroon French: Cameroun—République du Cameroun | Yaoundé English: Yaoundé French: Yaoundé | 27,198,628 | 475,442 km^{2} (183,569 sq mi) includes the Cameroonian-administered parts of Southern Cameroons, which is claimed by the Southern Cameroons Peoples Organisation as the Republic of Ambazonia | CFA franc |
| | | Central African Republic CAF | Sango: Ködörösêse tî Bêafrîka French: République centrafricaine | Bangui Sango: Bangî French: Bangui | 5,457,154 | 622,984 km^{2} (240,535 sq mi) | CFA franc |
| | | Chad Republic of Chad TCD | Arabic: تشاد—جمهورية تشاد (Tshād—Jumhūriyyat Tshād) French: Tchad—République du Tchad | N'Djamena Arabic: نجامينا (Nijāmīnā) French: N'Djaména | 17,179,740 | 1,284,000 km^{2} (495,755 sq mi) | CFA franc |
| | | Comoros Union of the Comoros COM | Arabic: جزرالقمر—جمهورية القمرالمتحدة (Juzur al Qamar—Jumhūriyyat al Qamar al Muttaḥidah) Comorian: Komori—Udzima wa Komori French: Comores—Union des Comores | Moroni Arabic: موروني (Mūrūnī) French: Moroni | 821,625 | 2,235 km^{2} (863 sq mi) | Comorian franc |
| | | Côte d’Ivoire Republic of Côte d'Ivoire CIV | French: Côte d'Ivoire—République de Côte d'Ivoire | Yamoussoukro French: Yamoussoukro | 27,478,249 | 322,460 km^{2} (124,503 sq mi) | CFA franc |
| | | Democratic Republic of the Congo (Note: Also known as Congo-Kinshasa and formerly as Zaire.) COD | French: République démocratique du Congo | Kinshasa French: Kinshasa | 95,894,118 | 2,344,858 km^{2} (905,355 sq mi) | Congolese franc |
| | | Republic of the Congo (Note: Also known as Congo-Brazzaville.) COG | French: République du Congo | Brazzaville French: Brazzaville | 5,835,806 | 342,000 km^{2} (132,047 sq mi) | CFA franc |
| | | Djibouti Republic of Djibouti DJI | Arabic: جيبوتي—جمهورية جيبوتي (Jibūti—Jumhūrīyat Jibūti) French: Djibouti—République de Djibouti | Djibouti Arabic: مدينة جيبوتي (Jibūti Madīna) French: Ville de Djibouti | 1,105,557 | 23,200 km^{2} (8,958 sq mi) | Djibouti franc |
| | | Egypt Arab Republic of Egypt (Note: Some territory could be argued to be a part of Asia or Africa.) EGY | Arabic: مصر—جمهورية مصر العربية(Miṣr—Jumhūrīyat Miṣr al ʿArabiyyah) | Cairo Arabic: القاهرة (al Qāhirah) | 109,262,178 | 1,001,449 km^{2} (386,662 sq mi) | Egyptian pound |
| | | Equatorial Guinea Republic of Equatorial Guinea GNQ | Spanish: Guinea Ecuatorial—República de Guinea Equatorial | Ciudad de la Paz Spanish: Ciudad de la Paz French: Ciudad de la Paz Portuguese: Ciudad de la Paz | 1,634,466 | 28,051 km^{2} (10,831 sq mi) | CFA franc |
| | | Eritrea State of Eritrea ERI | Arabic: إرتريا—دولة إرتريا (ʾIritriyā—Dawlat ʾIritriyā) English: Eritrea—State of Eritrea Tigrinya: ኤርትራ—ሃገረ ኤርትራ (ʾErtra—Hagere ʾErtra) | Asmara Arabic: أسمرة (ʾAsmara) English: Asmara Tigrinya: ኣስመራ (Asmera) | 3,620,312 | 117,600 km^{2} (45,406 sq mi) | nakfa |
| | | Eswatini Kingdom of Eswatini SWZ | English: Eswatini—Kingdom of Eswatini Swazi: eSwatini—Umbuso weSwatini | Lobamba (royal and legislative); Mbabane (administrative) English: Lobamba, Mbabane Swazi: Lobamba, ÉMbábáne | 1,192,271 | 17,364 km^{2} (6,704 sq mi) | lilangeni |
| | | Ethiopia Federal Democratic Republic of Ethiopia ETH | Amharic: Iትዮጵያ—የIትዮጵያ ፈደራላዊ ዲሞክራሲያዊ ሪፐብሊክ (Ītyōṗṗyā—Ītyōṗṗyā Fēdēralāwī Dēmōkrāsīyāwī Rīpeblīk) | Addis Ababa Amharic: አዲስ አበባ (Addis Abäba) | 120,283,026 | 1,104,300 km^{2} (426,373 sq mi) | Ethiopian birr |
| | | Gabon Gabonese Republic GAB | French: Gabon—République gabonaise | Libreville French: Libreville | 2,341,179 | 267,668 km^{2} (103,347 sq mi) | CFA franc |
| | | The Gambia Republic of the Gambia GMB | English: The Gambia—Republic of the Gambia | Banjul English: Banjul | 2,639,916 | 10,380 km^{2} (4,008 sq mi) | Gambian dalasi |
| | | Ghana Republic of Ghana GHA | English: Ghana—Republic of Ghana | Accra English: Accra | 32,833,031 | 238,534 km^{2} (92,098 sq mi) | Ghana cedi |
| | | Guinea (Note: Also known as Guinea-Conakry to distinguish it from neighboring Guinea-Bissau.) Republic of Guinea GIN | French: Guinée—République de Guinée | Conakry French: Conakry | 13,531,906 | 245,857 km^{2} (94,926 sq mi) | Guinean franc |
| | | Guinea-Bissau Republic of Guinea-Bissau GNB | Portuguese: Guiné-Bissau—República da Guiné-Bissau | Bissau Portuguese: Bissau | 2,060,721 | 36,125 km^{2} (13,948 sq mi) | CFA franc |
| | | Kenya Republic of Kenya KEN | English: Kenya—Republic of Kenya Swahili: Kenya—Jamhuri ya Kenya | Nairobi English: Nairobi Swahili: Nairobi | 53,005,614 | 580,367 km^{2} (224,081 sq mi) | Kenyan shilling |
| | | Lesotho Kingdom of Lesotho LSO | English: Lesotho—Kingdom of Lesotho Sotho: Lesotho—Muso oa Lesotho | Maseru English: Maseru Sotho: Maseru | 2,281,454 | 30,355 km^{2} (11,720 sq mi) | loti |
| | | Liberia Republic of Liberia LBR | English: Liberia—Republic of Liberia | Monrovia English: Monrovia | 5,193,416 | 111,369 km^{2} (43,000 sq mi) | Liberian dollar |
| | | Libya State of Libya LBY | Arabic: ليبيا—دولة ليبيا (Lībīyā) Berber: ⵍⵉⴱⵢⴰ (Libya) | Tripoli Arabic: طرابلس (Ṭarābulus) Berber: ⵟⵔⴰⴱⵍⴻⵙ (Ṭrables) | 6,735,277 | 1,759,540 km^{2} (679,362 sq mi) | Libyan dinar |
| | | Madagascar Republic of Madagascar MDG | French: Madagascar—République de Madagascar Malagasy: Madagasikara—Repoblikan'i Madagasikara | Antananarivo French: Antananarivo Malagasy: Antananarivo | 28,915,653 | 587,041 km^{2} (226,658 sq mi) | ariary |
| | | Malawi Republic of Malawi MWI | Chichewa: Malaŵi—Dziko la Malaŵi English: Malawi—Republic of Malawi | Lilongwe Chichewa: Lilongwe English: Lilongwe | 19,889,742 | 118,484 km^{2} (45,747 sq mi) | Malawian kwacha |
| | | Mali Republic of Mali MLI | French: Mali—République du Mali | Bamako French: Bamako | 21,904,983 | 1,240,192 km^{2} (478,841 sq mi) | CFA franc |
| | | Mauritania Islamic Republic of Mauritania MRT | Arabic: موريتانيا—الجمهورية الإسلامية الموريتانية (Mūrītānīyyā—Al Jumhūriyyah alʾIslāmiyyah al Mūrītānīyyah) | Nouakchott Arabic: نواكشوط (Nuwākshūṭ) | 4,614,974 | 1,030,700 km^{2} (397,955 sq mi) | ouguiya |
| | | Mauritius Republic of Mauritius MUS | English: Mauritius—Republic of Mauritius French: Maurice—République de Maurice Mauritian Creole: Moris—Repiblik Moris | Port Louis English: Port Louis French: Port-Louis Mauritian Creole: Porlwi | 1,298,915 | 2,040 km^{2} (788 sq mi) | Mauritian rupee |
| | | Morocco Kingdom of Morocco MAR | Arabic: المغرب—المملكة المغربية (Al Maḡrib—Al Mamlakah al Maḡribiyyah) Berber: ⵍⵎⵖⵔⵉⴱ—ⵜⴰⴳⵍⴷⵉⵜ ⵏ ⵍⵎⴰⵖⵔⵉⴱ (Elmaġrib—Tageldit n-Elmaġrib) | Rabat Arabic: الرباط (ar-Ribaaṭ) Berber: ⴰⵕⴱⴰⵟ (Aṛbaṭ) | 37,076,584 | 446,550 km^{2} (172,414 sq mi) excludes all disputed territories 710,850 km^{2} (274,461 sq mi) includes the Moroccan-administered parts of Western Sahara, which is claimed by the Polisario Front as the Sahrawi Arab Democratic Republic | Moroccan dirham |
| | | Mozambique Republic of Mozambique MOZ | Portuguese: Moçambique—República de Moçambique | Maputo Portuguese: Maputo | 32,077,072 | 801,590 km^{2} (309,496 sq mi) | metical |
| | | Namibia Republic of Namibia NAM | English: Namibia—Republic of Namibia | Windhoek English: Windhoek | 2,530,151 | 825,418 km^{2} (318,696 sq mi) | Namibian dollar |
| | | Niger Republic of the Niger NER | Hausa: Nijar–Jamhuriyar Nijar | Niamey Hausa: Yamai | 25,252,722 | 1,267,000 km^{2} (489,191 sq mi) | CFA franc |
| | | Nigeria Federal Republic of Nigeria NGA | English: Nigeria—Federal Republic of Nigeria | Abuja English: Abuja | 213,401,323 | 923,768 km^{2} (356,669 sq mi) | naira |
| | | Rwanda Republic of Rwanda RWA | English: Rwanda—Republic of Rwanda French: Rwanda—République du Rwanda Kinyarwanda: Rwanda—Repubulika y'u Rwanda | Kigali English: Kigali French: Kigali Kinyarwanda: Kigali | 13,461,888 | 26,798 km^{2} (10,347 sq mi) | Rwandese franc |
| | | São Tomé and Príncipe Democratic Republic of São Tomé and Príncipe STP | Portuguese: São Tomé e Príncipe—República Democrática de São Tomé e Príncipe | São Tomé Portuguese: São Tomé | 223,107 | 964 km^{2} (372 sq mi) | Dobra |
| | | Senegal Republic of Senegal SEN | French: Sénégal—République du Sénégal | Dakar French: Dakar | 16,876,720 | 196,723 km^{2} (75,955 sq mi) | CFA franc |
| | | Seychelles Republic of Seychelles SYC | English: Seychelles—Republic of Seychelles French: Seychelles—République des Seychelles Seychellois Creole: Sesel—Repiblik Sesel | Victoria English: Victoria French: Victoria Seychellois Creole: Victoria | 106,471 | 451 km^{2} (174 sq mi) | Seychelles rupee |
| | | Sierra Leone Republic of Sierra Leone SLE | English: Sierra Leone—Republic of Sierra Leone | Freetown English: Freetown | 8,420,641 | 71,740 km^{2} (27,699 sq mi) | leone |
| | | Somalia Federal Republic of Somalia SOM | Arabic: الصومال—جمهورية الصومال الفيدرالية (Aṣ Ṣūmāl—Jumhūriyyah aṣ Ṣūmāl al Fīdrāliyyah) Somali: Soomaaliya—Jamhuuriyadda Federaalka Soomaaliya | Mogadishu Arabic: مقديشو (Maqadīshū) Somali: Muqdisho | 17,065,581 | 637,657 km^{2} (246,201 sq mi) | Somali shilling |
| | | South Africa Republic of South Africa ZAF | Afrikaans: Suid-Afrika—Republiek van Suid-Afrika 10 other official names: English: South Africa—Republic of South Africa Tsonga: Afrika Dzonga—Riphabliki ra Afrika Dzonga Tswana: Aforika Borwa—Rephaboliki ya Aforika Borwa Southern Ndebele: Sewula Afrika—iRiphabliki yeSewula Afrika Northern Sotho: Afrika-Borwa—Repabliki ya Afrika-Borwa (Southern) Sotho: Afrika Borwa—Rephaboliki ya Afrika Borwa Swati: Ningizimu Afrika—iRiphabhulikhi yeNingizimu Afrika Venda: Afurika Tshipembe—Riphabuḽiki ya Afurika Tshipembe Xhosa: uMzantsi Afrika—iRiphabliki yomZantsi Afrika Zulu: Ningizimu Afrika—iRiphabhuliki yaseNingizimu Afrika | Bloemfontein (judicial), Cape Town (legislative), and Pretoria (executive) | 59,392,255 | 1,221,037 km^{2} (471,445 sq mi) | rand |
| | | South Sudan Republic of South Sudan SSD | English: South Sudan—Republic of South Sudan | Juba English: Juba | 10,748,272 | 644,329 km^{2} (248,777 sq mi) | South Sudanese pound |
| | | Sudan Republic of the Sudan SDN | Arabic: السودان—جمهورية السودان (As Sūdān—Jumhūriyyah as Sūdān) English: Sudan—Republic of the Sudan | Khartoum Arabic: الخرطوم (Al Khurṭūm) English: Khartoum | 45,657,202 | 1,861,484 km^{2} (718,723 sq mi) | Sudanese pound |
| | | Tanzania United Republic of Tanzania TZA | English: Tanzania—United Republic of Tanzania Swahili: Tanzania—Jamhuri ya Muungano wa Tanzania | Dodoma (official); Dar es Salaam (seat of government) English: Dodoma Swahili: Dodoma | 63,588,334 | 945,203 km^{2} (364,945 sq mi) | Tanzanian shilling |
| | | Togo Togolese Republic TGO | French: Togo—République Togolaise | Lomé French: Lomé | 8,644,829 | 56,785 km^{2} (21,925 sq mi) | CFA franc |
| | | Tunisia Republic of Tunisia TUN | Arabic: تونس—الجمهورية التونسية (Tūnis—Al Jumhūriyyah at Tūnisīyyah) | Tunis Arabic: تونس (Tūnis) | 12,262,946 | 163,610 km^{2} (63,170 sq mi) | Tunisian dinar |
| | | Uganda Republic of Uganda UGA | English: Uganda—Republic of Uganda Swahili: Uganda—Jamhuri ya Uganda | Kampala English: Kampala Swahili: Kampala | 45,853,778 | 236,040 km^{2} (91,136 sq mi) | Ugandan shilling |
| | | Zambia Republic of Zambia ZMB | English: Zambia—Republic of Zambia | Lusaka English: Lusaka | 19,473,125 | 752,614 km^{2} (290,586 sq mi) | Zambian kwacha |
| | | Zimbabwe Republic of Zimbabwe ZWE | English: Zimbabwe—Republic of Zimbabwe | Harare English: Harare | 15,993,524 | 390,757 km^{2} (150,872 sq mi) | Zimbabwe dollar |

=== Sovereign states with limited international recognition ===
The following two entities have declared themselves to be sovereign states and are in control of some territory but have limited recognition from other states. Neither entity is a member state of the United Nations, although the Sahrawi Arab Democratic Republic is a member of the African Union.

| Flag | Map | English short, formal names, and ISO | Status | Domestic short name(s) and formal name(s) | Capital | Population | Area | Currency |
|---|---|---|---|---|---|---|---|---|
| | | Sahrawi Arab Democratic Republic (Note: Occupies part of the territory of Western Sahara, disputed with Morocco.) | Claimed by Morocco as its southernmost provinces Recognised by the African Union and 46 UN members and South Ossetia as the representative government of Western Sahara | Arabic: الجمهورية العربية الصحراوية الديمقراطية (Al Jumhūrīyah al ‘Arabīyah aṣ Ṣaḥrāwīyah ad Dīmuqrāṭīyah) Spanish: República Árabe Saharaui Democrática | El Aaiún (proclaimed) (Note: Currently under Moroccan administration. Tifariti is the factual temporary capital, but Tindouf located in Algeria is the place of some government and military facilities.) Arabic: العيون (AlʿUyūn) Spanish: El Aaiún | 582,478 | 267,405 km^{2} (103,246 sq mi) | Sahrawi peseta |
| | | Somaliland Republic of Somaliland | State not controlled by Somalia Recognized by Israel and by Taiwan | Arabic: أرض الصومال—جمهورية أرض الصومال (Arḍ aṣ Ṣūmāl—Jumhūrīyat Arḍ aṣ Ṣūmāl) Somali: Soomaaliland—Jamhuuriyadda Soomaaliland | Hargeisa Arabic: هرجيسا (Harjaysā) Somali: Hargeysa | 4,000,000 | 176,120 km^{2} (68,000 sq mi) | Somaliland shilling |

== Non-sovereign territories ==
There are currently 11 non-sovereign territories in Africa. Except two Spanish autonomous cities and Peñón de Vélez de la Gomera, all the remaining territories are islands off the continent's coast.

=== Dependent territories ===
| Flag | Map | English short, formal names, and ISO | Ruling power | Status | Domestic short name and formal name | Capital | Population | Area | Currency |
|---|---|---|---|---|---|---|---|---|---|
| | | Saint Helena, Ascension and Tristan da Cunha SH | United Kingdom | British Overseas Territory | English: Saint Helena, Ascension and Tristan da Cunha | Jamestown | 5,633 | 420 km^{2} (162 sq mi) | Saint Helena pound (Saint Helena & Ascension); Pound sterling (Tristan da Cunha) |
| | | French Southern and Antarctic Lands (Note: Only the Îles Éparses are considered part of the African continent. The remaining four districts lie outside the continental shelf in the Indian Ocean or Antarctica.) FR-TF | France | Overseas territory of France | French: Terres australes et antarctiques françaises | Saint Pierre (Note: The main station on the Îles Éparses is on Tromelin. The headquarters of the district chief, however, is Saint Pierre, in Réunion.) | No permanent population | 38.60 km^{2} (15 sq mi) | euro |

=== Other territories ===
This list contains nine territories that are administered as incorporated areas of a primarily non-African country.

| Flag | Map | English short, formal names, and ISO | Ruling power | Status | Domestic short name(s) and formal name(s) | Capital | Population | Area | Currency |
|---|---|---|---|---|---|---|---|---|---|
| | | Canary Islands Autonomous Region of the Canary Islands ES-CN | Spain | Autonomous community of Spain | Spanish: Islas Canarias | Santa Cruz and Las Palmas Spanish: Santa Cruz de Tenerife and Las Palmas de Gran Canaria | 2,207,225 | 7,447 km^{2} (2,875 sq mi) | euro |
| | | Ceuta Autonomous City of Ceuta ES-CE | Spain | Autonomous city of Spain | Spanish: Ceuta—Ciudad autónoma de Ceuta | Ceuta Spanish: Ceuta | 84,843 | 28 km^{2} (11 sq mi) | euro |
| | | Madeira Autonomous Region of Madeira PT-30 | Portugal | Autonomous Region of Portugal | Portuguese: Madeira—Região Autónoma da Madeira | Funchal Portuguese: Funchal | 267,785 | 828 km^{2} (320 sq mi) | euro |
| | | Mayotte Mayotte Region YT | France | Overseas region and constituent part of the French Republic | French: Mayotte—Région Mayotte | Mamoudzou French: Mamoudzou | 266,380 | 374 km^{2} (144 sq mi) | euro |
| | | Melilla Autonomous City of Melilla ES-ML | Spain | Autonomous city of Spain | Spanish: Melilla—Ciudad autónoma de Melilla | Melilla Spanish: Melilla | 84,714 | 20 km^{2} (8 sq mi) | euro |
| | | Pelagian Islands | Italy | Comune of Italy | Italian: Isole Pelagie Sicilian: Ìsuli Pilaggî | Lampedusa e Linosa Italian: Lampedusa e Linosa Sicilian: Lampidusa e Linusa | 6,304 | 21.4 km^{2} (8 sq mi) | euro |
| | | Plazas de soberanía | Spain | Overseas territory of Spain | Spanish: Plazas de soberanía | N/A | 74 | 0.59 km^{2} (0.23 sq mi) | euro |
| | | Réunion Réunion Region RE | France | Overseas region and constituent part of the French Republic | French: Réunion—Région Réunion | Saint-Denis French: Saint-Denis | 889,918 | 2,512 km^{2} (970 sq mi) | euro |
| | | Socotra Archipelago | Yemen | Governorate of Yemen | Arabic: أرخبيل سقطرى (ʾArḫabīl Suquṭrā) | Hadibu Arabic: اديبو (Ḥādībū) | 60,550 | 3,974.64 km^{2} (1,535 sq mi) | Yemeni rial |

== See also ==
- List of predecessors of sovereign states in Africa
- List of African countries by area
- List of African countries by population
- List of African countries by population density
- List of African countries by GDP (nominal)
- List of African countries by GDP (PPP)
- List of sovereign states and dependent territories in Eurasia

== See also ==
- List of predecessors of sovereign states in Africa
- List of African countries by area
- List of African countries by population
- List of African countries by population density
- List of African countries by GDP (nominal)
- List of African countries by GDP (PPP)
- List of sovereign states and dependent territories in Eurasia
