= Successor state =

Process of transferring roles and responsibilities as states and their boundaries change

A successor state is a concept in international relations regarding a sovereign state that has formed over a territory and populace that was previously under the sovereignty of another state. A successor state may or may not acquire a new international legal personality, while a continuing state (also known as a continuator or historical heir) retains the same international legal personality and all the rights and obligations of a predecessor state. The theory has its roots in 19th-century diplomacy.

== Partial and universal state succession ==
A state succession can be characterized as either being universal or partial. A universal state succession occurs when one state is completely extinguished and its sovereignty is replaced by that of one or more successor states. A partial state succession occurs when successor state(s) succeed only part of a state's land and sovereignty, which continues to exist where succession has not taken place.

An example of a partial state succession is the case of the secession of Bangladesh from Pakistan. There was no challenge to Pakistan's claim to continue to exist and to retain its membership of the United Nations: it was a continuator and not a successor. Bangladesh eventually was recognized as a new state: it was a successor and had to apply for UN membership.

An example of a universal state succession is the dissolution of Czechoslovakia. Neither part claimed any continuity: both Czechia and Slovakia were new successor states.

There are cases where a state is completely extinguished or abolished without having any successor states. Cases like this occur when, for example, one state is annexed or conquered by another and ceases to exist even in nominal form (i.e., not even a "government in exile" is established). An example is East Germany, which was completely abolished with the reunification of Germany. The modern state known as Germany is a continuation of West Germany and not a successor state of East Germany.

== Rights and obligations ==
Consequent upon the acquisition of international legal personality, the difficult matter of succession to treaty rights and obligations arises. Succession may refer to the transfer of rights, obligations, or property from a previously well-established predecessor state to its successor state, and can include overseas assets such as diplomatic missions, foreign-exchange reserves, and museum artifacts; and participation in treaties in force at the date of succession or international organizations. In an attempt to codify the rules of succession of states, the Vienna Convention on Succession of States in Respect of Treaties entered into force on 6 November 1996; as of 2019, only 23 states, out of 193 UN members, are party to it.

== Classification of cases ==
In their application to the acquisition of independence, distinctions should be drawn between different cases though the line of demarcation is not always clear:

- Bilateral and multilateral treaties necessarily give rise to different considerations.
- There are real treaties and personal treaties. Real treaties affect the territory itself, such as boundary agreements or the grant of transit rights, which can continue irrespective of the personality of the state. The new state must take over the country in the condition in which it finds it, as the parent state cannot give more than it possesses. Such treaties can be described as "treaties creating purely local obligations".

== Exceptions to orderly succession ==
There are several recent examples where a succession of states, as described above, has not been entirely adhered to. This is mostly a list of the exceptions that have occurred since the creation of the United Nations in 1945. In previous historical periods, the exceptions would be too many to list.

=== Afghanistan ===
The Taliban state in Afghanistan (the Islamic Emirate of Afghanistan) became the de facto government of nearly all the country in the mid-1990s, but the Afghan Northern Alliance was still recognised by many nations and retained the UN seat. In 2021, the Taliban again took power, but as of 30 December 2024, it does not have the Afghanistan UN seat, which is still held by representatives appointed by the former government.

=== China ===
The People's Republic of China (PRC) was established in 1949 in mainland China and claimed succession from the Republic of China (ROC). The ROC's territory was reduced to mainly the island of Taiwan, who took control from Japan in 1945, although it continues to claim control of the mainland. At the start of the Cold War the PRC was recognized by few states; the ROC continued to represent "China" in the United Nations and hold the permanent seat on the UN Security Council. In 1971, the PRC replaced the ROC in the UN through General Assembly Resolution 2758; this followed a trend of greater recognition for the PRC at the expense of the ROC. Although the resolution makes no mention of Taiwan, the ROC continues to be unrepresented within the United Nations but exercises sovereignty over the Taiwan Area. In addition to mainland China, the ROC also claims borderlands unclaimed by the PRC, most notably Outer Mongolia.

In Chinese history, periods of prolonged political division and dynastic transition saw the existence of more than one claimant to "China" at the same time. China was politically divided during several sustained periods historically, with two or more states simultaneously existing on territories associated with "China" and claiming to represent "China". Examples include the Three Kingdoms, Sixteen Kingdoms, Northern and Southern dynasties, Five Dynasties and Ten Kingdoms periods, Warlord Era and the Chinese Soviet Republic among others. Just as the PRC and the ROC formally claim exclusive mandate over the entirety of China, historical Chinese dynasties that existed during periods of sustained political disunity often claimed exclusive Chinese politico-cultural orthodoxy at the expense of others.

During dynastic transitions, it was rare for one dynasty to end abruptly and transition smoothly to a new one, resulting in the existence of more than one entity claiming to be "China". For instance, during the Ming–Qing transition, the Ming dynasty existed alongside the Qing dynasty (or Predynastic Qing) for a period before 1644. The predecessor of the Qing dynasty, the Later Jin dynasty, was established in 1616 and ruled over Northeast China whilst the Ming dynasty ruled over China proper. Following the fall of the Ming dynasty in 1644, remnants of the Ming imperial family, whose regime is known in historiography as the Southern Ming dynasty, continued to rule parts of southern China until 1662. Multiple ephemeral regimes also existed during this period, including the Shun and Xi dynasties on mainland China, and the Ming loyalist Kingdom of Tungning on Taiwan.

=== Republic of Ireland ===
Ireland, then called the Irish Free State, seceded from the United Kingdom in December 1922, under the terms of the Anglo-Irish Treaty that had been signed exactly a year earlier, in December 1921. The new state took the view that when a new state comes into being after formerly being part of an older state, its acceptance of treaty relationships established by the older state is a matter for the new state to determine by express declaration, or by conduct in the case of each individual treaty. In practice, however, the Irish regarded the commercial and administrative treaties of the United Kingdom of Great Britain and Ireland previously applying to the territory of the Irish Free State as remaining in force.

=== Israel ===
Israel took the view that, by virtue of its declaration of independence in 1948, a new international personality distinct from Mandatory Palestine was created, and that it started with a clean slate, and was bound only by such of the former international obligations affecting the territory as Israel might accept.

=== Kampuchea/Cambodia ===
When Democratic Kampuchea led by Pol Pot was militarily displaced by the Vietnamese-backed People's Republic of Kampuchea, the country's United Nations seat was held by Democratic Kampuchea for many years. It is now held by the Second Kingdom of Cambodia.

=== Korea ===
When the Provisional Government of the Republic of Korea was formed in 1919, it claimed continuity directly from the Korean Empire which preceded the peninsula's 1910 Japanese annexation. These claims were reiterated by South Korea, which itself claimed continuity from the provisional government. An important tenet of South Korea's national identity is that the 35-year period of Japanese rule is internationally recognized as an illegal occupation. South Korea resumed membership to international organizations such as the Universal Postal Union and re-affirmed that pre-1910 treaties were still in force.

=== Ottoman Empire/Turkey ===
There is some debate over whether the modern Republic of Turkey is a continuing state to the Ottoman Empire or a successor. The two entities fought on opposing sides in the Turkish War of Independence (1919–1923), and even briefly co-existed as separate administrative units (whilst at war with one another): Turkey with its capital in Angora (now Ankara) and the Ottoman Empire from Constantinople (now Istanbul), but this type of scenario is also common in civil wars. The Turkish National Movement, led by Mustafa Kemal who defected from the Ottoman Army, established the modern republic as a nation-state (or new government regime) by defeating the opposing elements in the Turkish War of Independence. There remains debate about whether the conflict was a war of independence, or a civil war that led to a regime change.

The question of state succession is relevant to the issue of Armenian genocide reparations.

=== Pakistan ===
After Pakistan was created in 1947, it claimed that it was automatically a member of the United Nations. The United Nations Secretariat, however, expressed the following opinion:

From the viewpoint of International Law, the situation is one in which part of an existing State breaks off and becomes a new State. On this analysis there is no change in the international status of India; it continues as a State with all treaty rights and obligations, and consequently with all rights and obligations of membership in the United Nations. The territory which breaks off—Pakistan—will be a new State. It will not have the treaty rights and obligations of the old State and will not, of course, have membership in the United Nations. In International Law, the situation is analogous to the separation of the Irish Free State from Britain, and Belgium from the Netherlands. In these cases the portion which separated was considered a new State, and the remaining portion continued as an existing State with all the rights and duties which it had before.

=== Soviet Union/Russian Federation ===
The Soviet Union (USSR) dissolved in 1991, which together with its Ukrainian SSR and Byelorussian SSR as separate United Nations members, co-founded the United Nations in 1945.

The Russian SFSR within the Soviet Union in 1956–1991

The Russian Federation succeeded to the Soviet Union's United Nations membership, including its permanent membership on the Security Council of the United Nations. Russia accounted for more than 75% of the Soviet Union's economy, the majority of its population and 75% of its land mass; in addition, the history of the Soviet Union began in Russia with the October Revolution in 1917 in Petrograd. If there was to be a successor to the Soviet seat on the Security Council among the former Soviet republics, these factors made Russia seem a logical choice. In a letter dated 24 December 1991, the Russian president Boris Yeltsin informed the Secretary-General that the membership of the USSR in the Security Council and all other United Nations organs was being continued by the Russian Federation with the support of the nine member countries of the Commonwealth of Independent States. All Soviet embassies became Russian embassies.

=== Yugoslavia ===
Animated series of maps showing the breakup of the SFR Yugoslavia and subsequent developments, from 1989 through 2008. The colors represent the different areas of control.: Socialist Federal Republic of Yugoslavia (1945–92); Slovenia (25 June 1991–); Croatia (25 June 1991–); Republic of Serbian Krajina (1991–95; became a part of Croatia after Operation Storm); Republic of North Macedonia (1991–; named "Republic of Macedonia" until 2019); Republic of Bosnia and Herzegovina (1992–95; became a part of Bosnia and Herzegovina); Croatian Republic of Herzeg-Bosnia (1991–94; became a part of Bosnia and Herzegovina); Republika Srpska (1992–95; became part of Bosnia and Herzegovina); Federal Republic of Yugoslavia (1992–2003; reconstructed into the "State Union of Serbia and Montenegro" in 2003–06); Autonomous Province of Western Bosnia (1991–94; became a part of Bosnia and Herzegovina); Bosnia and Herzegovina (1995–); UN Transitional Administration in Eastern Slavonia, Baranja and Western Syrmia (1996–1998; became a part of Croatia); Montenegro (3 June 2006–); Serbia (5 June 2006–); Kosovo (17 February 2008–; only partially recognised, claimed by Serbia)

After four of the six constituent republics of the Socialist Federal Republic of Yugoslavia seceded in 1991 and 1992, the rump state, renamed the Federal Republic of Yugoslavia, stated it was the continuation of the Socialist Federal Republic of Yugoslavia – against the objections of the newly independent republics. Representatives from Belgrade continued to hold the original Yugoslav seat at the UN – however, the United States refused to recognize it. The remaining territory of the federation was less than half of the population and territory of the former Yugoslavia. In 1992 the Security Council on 19 September (Resolution 777) and the General Assembly on 22 September (Resolution 47/1), decided to refuse to allow the new Yugoslavia to sit in the General Assembly under the name of "Yugoslavia" on the theory that the Socialist Federal Republic of Yugoslavia had dissolved.

The first negotiations on succession issues of the former Socialist Federal Republic of Yugoslavia began in 1992 within the framework of the Working Group on Succession Issues of the Peace Conference on Yugoslavia. The agreement was initially prevented by the insistence of the Federal Republic of Yugoslavia that it was the exclusive legal and political continuation of the former Yugoslavia as well as the owner of all state property owned by the earlier federal government, and that it was willing to renounce a part of it only as an act of goodwill. The Federal Republic of Yugoslavia interpreted the breakup of Yugoslavia as a process of serial secessions and not as a complete dismemberment of the Yugoslav state, an interpretation rejected by the other former Yugoslav republics. The Badinter Arbitration Committee recommended a division of assets and liabilities based on principle of equity, referring to the 1983 Vienna Convention on Succession of States in Respect of State Property, Archives and Debt (a convention not in force which at the time was signed by only six states, including the Socialist Federal Republic of Yugoslavia). This proposal was unacceptable to the Federal Republic of Yugoslavia which therefore motivated the International Monetary Fund to develop an alternative key model which considered the economic power of republics and their contribution to the federal budget, which was accepted by all. The key determined participation of the Federal Republic of Yugoslavia with 36.52%, Croatia with 28.49%, Slovenia 16.39%, Bosnia and Herzegovina with 13.20% and Macedonia with 5.20%. An agreement was also reached on gold and other reserves at the Bank for International Settlements, but the final conclusion was postponed by the beginning of the Kosovo War.

After the end of the NATO bombing of Yugoslavia followed next year by the overthrow of Slobodan Milošević, the Federal Republic of Yugoslavia was admitted as a new member to the United Nations on 1 November 2000. The successor states then concluded their agreement. In 2001, with the support of the international community, five countries (Slovenia, Croatia, Bosnia and Herzegovina, the former Yugoslav Republic of Macedonia – today North Macedonia – and the Federal Republic of Yugoslavia – today Serbia and Montenegro) signed the Agreement on Succession Issues of the Former Socialist Federal Republic of Yugoslavia which conclusively confirmed that five sovereign equal successor states were formed upon the dissolution of the former Yugoslavia. It entered into force on 2 June 2004, when the last successor state ratified it. The agreement was signed as an umbrella agreement which included annexes on diplomatic and consular properties, financial assets and liabilities, archives, pensions, other rights, interests and liabilities as well as private properties and acquired rights.

The Federal Republic of Yugoslavia was renamed the State Union of Serbia and Montenegro in 2003, and in May 2006, Montenegro declared independence. Serbia continued to hold the defunct State Union's (and thus the Federal Republic of Yugoslavia's) seat at the UN and most other international organizations. At the dissolution of Serbia and Montenegro (one of the five successor states of the former Yugoslavia), the two countries agreed on Serbian sole succession of rights and obligations of their federation.

Additionally, Kosovo, one of the autonomous provinces of Yugoslavia and Serbia, declared independence in February 2008.

== Examples ==
- The Russian Federation, as successor state to the Union of Soviet Socialist Republics, took over the USSR’s seat at the United Nations
- The People's Republic of China, as the official successor state to the Republic of China, inherited the ROC's seat at the United Nations
- Serbia, successor state to the Federal Republic of Yugoslavia (earlier claim to SFR Yugoslavia succession dropped in 2000)
- The Islamic Republic of Iran, continuing state to the Imperial State of Iran
- The Syrian Arab Republic, under the Syrian transitional government, continued Ba'athist Syria.
- Sudan, the reduced state after the creation of South Sudan
- Predecessors of sovereign states in Africa
- Predecessors of sovereign states in Asia
- Predecessors of sovereign states in North America
- Predecessors of sovereign states in South America
- Predecessors of sovereign states in Europe
- Predecessors of sovereign states in Oceania

== See also ==
- Comparative history
- International law
- Translatio imperii
- Vienna Convention on Succession of States in respect of Treaties
- State continuity of the Baltic states
- Timeline of historical geopolitical changes
- Peaceful transition of power
- Odious debt

== Bibliography ==
- Burgenthal/Doehring/Kokott: Grundzüge des Völkerrechts, 2. Auflage, Heidelberg 2000 (in German)
