= List of African countries by population density =

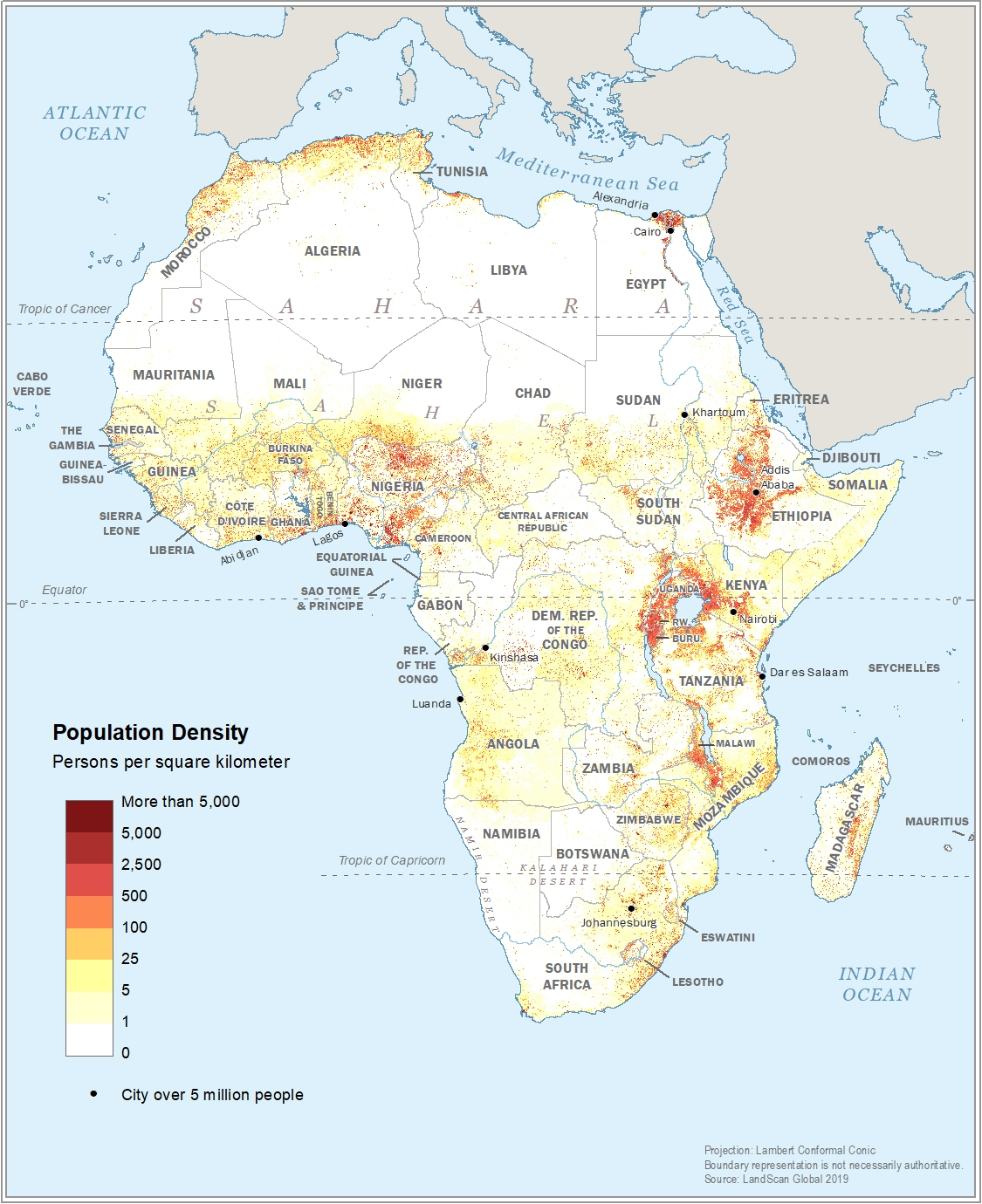
Density map of Africa

This is a list of African countries and dependencies by population density in inhabitants/km^{2}. Saint Helena, being closest to Africa, has been included.

Rank	Country or territory	Density		Area		Population (2015 est.)
Rank	Country or territory	inh./km^{2}	inh./mi²	km^{2}	mi²	Population (2015 est.)
—	Mayotte (France)	641.7	1,662	374	144	240,000
1	Mauritius	624.0	1,616	2,040	790	1,273,000
2	Rwanda	440.8	1,142	26,338	10,169	11,610,000
3	Burundi	401.7	1,040	27,830	10,750	11,179,000
4	Comoros	363.1	940	2,170	840	788,000
—	Réunion (France)	342.8	888	2,512	970	861,200
5	Seychelles	211.0	546	455	176	96,000
6	Nigeria	197.2	511	923,768	356,669	182,202,000
7	São Tomé and Príncipe	189.8	492	1,001	386	190,000
8	Gambia	176.2	456	11,300	4,400	1,991,000
9	Uganda	165.4	428	236,040	91,140	39,032,000
10	Malawi	145.3	376	118,480	45,750	17,215,000
11	Cabo Verde	129.2	335	4,033	1,557	521,000
12	Togo	128.6	333	56,785	21,925	7,305,000
13	Ghana	114.5	297	239,460	92,460	27,410,000
14	Benin	96.6	250	112,620	43,480	10,880,000
15	Egypt	91.4	237	1,001,450	386,660	91,508,000
16	Sierra Leone	89.9	233	71,740	27,700	6,453,000
17	Ethiopia	88.2	228	1,127,127	435,186	99,391,000
18	Kenya	79.0	205	582,650	224,960	46,050,000
19	Senegal	77.1	200	196,190	75,750	15,129,000
20	Eswatini	74.1	192	17,363	6,704	1,287,000
21	Ivory Coast	70.4	182	322,460	124,500	22,702,000
22	Lesotho	70.3	182	30,355	11,720	2,135,000
23	Tunisia	68.8	178	163,610	63,170	11,254,000
24	Burkina Faso	66.0	171	274,200	105,900	18,106,000
25	Tanzania	56.6	147	945,087	364,900	53,470,000
26	Guinea	51.3	133	245,857	94,926	12,609,000
27	Guinea-Bissau	51.1	132	36,120	13,950	1,844,000
28	Cameroon	49.1	127	475,440	183,570	23,344,000
29	Morocco	46.4	120	710,850	274,460	34,378,000
30	South Africa	44.7	116	1,219,912	471,011	54,490,000
31	Eritrea	43.1	112	121,320	46,840	5,228,000
32	Madagascar	41.3	107	587,040	226,660	24,235,000
33	Liberia	40.4	105	111,370	43,000	4,503,000
34	Zimbabwe	39.9	103	390,580	150,800	15,603,000
35	Djibouti	38.6	100	23,000	8,900	888,000
36	Mozambique	34.9	90	801,590	309,500	27,978,000
37	Democratic Republic of the Congo	32.9	85	2,345,410	905,570	77,267,000
38	Equatorial Guinea	30.1	78	28,051	10,831	845,000
39	Sudan	21.6	56	1,861,484	718,723	40,235,000
40	Zambia	21.5	56	752,614	290,586	16,212,000
41	Angola	20.1	52	1,246,700	481,400	25,022,000
42	South Sudan	19.2	50	644,329	248,777	12,340,000
43	Somalia	16.9	44	637,657	246,201	10,787,000
44	Algeria	16.7	43	2,381,740	919,590	39,667,000
45	Niger	15.7	41	1,267,000	489,000	19,899,000
46	Mali	14.2	37	1,240,000	480,000	17,600,000
47	Republic of the Congo	13.5	35	342,000	132,000	4,620,000
48	Chad	10.9	28	1,284,000	496,000	14,037,000
—	Saint Helena, Ascension and Tristan da Cunha (UK)	19.6	51	394	152	7,729
49	Central African Republic	7.9	20	622,984	240,535	4,900,000
50	Gabon	6.4	17	267,667	103,347	1,725,000
51	Mauritania	3.9	10	1,030,700	398,000	4,068,000
52	Botswana	3.8	9.8	600,370	231,800	2,262,000
53	Libya	3.6	9.3	1,759,540	679,360	6,278,000
54	Namibia	3.0	7.8	825,418	318,696	2,459,000
—	Average/Total	39.1	101	30,360,301	11,722,178	1,186,178,255

== See also ==
- List of African countries by population
- List of African countries by GDP
- Demographics of Africa
