= La cité du Fleuve =

La Cité du Fleuve
- Interactive map of La Cité du Fleuve
- Coordinates: 4°19′36″S 15°21′10″E
- Country: DR Congo
- City-province: Kinshasa

Area
  - City: 25 km^{2} (9.7 sq mi)
  - Land: 9 km^{2} (3.5 sq mi)
  - Water: 16 km^{2} (6.2 sq mi)
  - Metro: 3,577 km^{2} (1,381 sq mi)
- Time zone: UTC+1 (WAT)

La Cité du Fleuve is a residential development on the outskirts of Kinshasa, Democratic Republic of the Congo, being constructed on land reclaimed from the Congo River. La Cité du Fleuve was announced in early 2008. In June 2009 the land reclamation and construction work began.

The development is situated on reclaimed land space in the sandbanks and marshes of the Congo river, directly adjacent to Kinshasa. Upon completion, the new island was anticipated to house 250,000 residents.

In November 2015 this project was only 20% completed, and the investment exceeded US$100 million. In 2021, 500 apartments had been completed. In 2024, the development was affected by inundations.
