= List of predecessors of sovereign states in Africa =

This is a list of all present sovereign states in Africa and their predecessors. The region of Africa is generally defined geographically to include the subregions of African continent, Madagascar island, Mauritius Island and several minor islands, and their respective sovereign states. Africa was originally colonised by Europeans with Southern Africa primarily by the British, and the West Africa and North Africa primarily by the British, French, Spanish and Portuguese. Today, Africa consists of 54 sovereign states of various government types, the most common consisting of parliamentary systems.

Sovereign state	Predecessors
Algeria	Part of the Carthaginian Empire (814–202 BC); Massylii (4th century); Part of the Kingdom of Mauretania (capital city in Volubilis, located in modern day Morocco) (3rd century BC – 25 BC); Kingdom of Numidia (202–40 BC); Center of the Kingdom of Mauretania (capital city in Cherchell, located in modern day Algeria) (25 BC – 42 AD); Mauretania Caesariensis (40 BC – 395 AD) (province of the Roman Empire); Mauretania Caesariensis (395–435) (province of the Western Roman Empire); Center of the Vandal Kingdom (435–439); Kingdom of Ouarsenis (430–735); Part of the Vandal Kingdom (439–534); Mauro-Roman Kingdom (477-578); Kingdom of the Aurès (484–703); Kingdom of Altava (578-708); Part of the Exarchate of Africa (590–698) (a division of the Eastern Roman Empire); Part of the Umayyad Caliphate (661–750); Part of the Abbasid Caliphate (750–778); Emirate of Tlemcen (757–790); Rustamid Imamate (778–909); Part of the Aghlabid Emirate (800–909); Part of the Fatimid Caliphate (909–973); Center of the Zirid Emirate (973–1014); Part of the Zirid Emirate (1014–1148); Hammadid Sultanate (1014–1152); Part of the Almohad Caliphate (1152–1235); Zayyanid Sultanate of Tlemcen (1235–1554); Sultanate of Tuggurt (1414–1871); Sultanate of Beni Abbas (1510–1872); Sultanate of Kuku (1515–1638); Eyalet of Aljazayer (1515–1830) (eyalet (state) of the Ottoman Empire); Colony of Algeria (1830–1848) (part of the French Empire); Emirate of Abdelkader (1832–1847); French Algeria (1848–1962) (part of the French Empire, being an integral region of the metropole); Provisional Government of the Algerian Republic (1958–1962); People's Democratic Republic of Algeria (1962–present)
Angola	The territory of Angola has been inhabited since the Paleolithic Era by the San people; Kongo (1390–1940); Kasanze Kingdom (1500–1648); Mbunda Kingdom (1500–1917); Kingdom of Ndongo (1515–1909); Kingdom of Oukwanyama (1600–1927); Kasanje Kingdom (1620–1912); Kingdom of Matamba (1631–1744); Kingdom of Bailundo (1700–present); Kingdom of Viye (1700–present); State of West Africa (1575–1951) (part of the Portuguese Empire); Overseas Province of Angola (1951–1972) (part of the Portuguese Empire); State of Angola (1972–1975) (part of the Portuguese Empire); People's Republic of Angola (1975–1992); Republic of Angola (1992–present)
Benin	Kingdom of Ardra (12th/13th century – 1724); Kingdom of Whydah (1580–1727); Kingdom of Dahomey (c. 1600–1894); Kingdom of Dahomey (French protectorate) (1894–1904); Colony of Dahomey and Dependencies (1904–1958) (part of the French West Africa, federation of colonies within of the French Empire); Republic of Dahomey (1958–1975) (self-governing colony within the French Empire on 4 December 1958, full independent state on 1 August 1960); People's Republic of Benin (1975–1990); Republic of Benin (1990–present)
Botswana	The territory of Botswana has been inhabited since the Paleolithic Era. The original inhabitants of southern Africa were the tribal San and Khoi peoples.; Tribal Bantu-speaking peoples first moved into the country from the north (c. 600 AD); Bechuanaland Protectorate (1885–1966) (part of the British Empire); Republic of Botswana (1966–present)
Burkina Faso	Bura culture (3rd–13th century); Burkina Faso was divided into several Mossi Kingdoms (11th century – 1896); Kingdom of Gwiriko (1714–1897); part of the French West Africa, a federation of colonies of the French Empire (1896–1919); French Upper Volta (1919–1958) (part of the French West Africa); Republic of Upper Volta (1958–1984) (self-governing colony within the French Empire on 11 December 1958, full independent state on 5 August 1960); Burkina Faso (1984–present)
Burundi	Kingdom of Burundi (17th century–1890); Kingdom of Burundi, part of German East Africa (1891–1916) (part of the German Empire); Kingdom of Burundi under military occupation of the Belgian Empire (1916–1922); Kingdom of Burundi, part of the Mandate of Ruanda-Urundi (1922–1946) (a League of Nations Mandate territory administered by Belgium); Kingdom of Burundi, part of the Trust Territory of Ruanda-Urundi (1946–1962) (a United Nations Trust Territory administered by Belgium); Kingdom of Burundi (independent state) (1962–1966); Republic of Burundi (1966–present)
Cameroon	The territory of Cameroon has been inhabited since the Neolithic Era, hosting a wide variety of ethnic groups, tribes, fondoms and kingdoms (such as the kingdoms of Kotoko, Mandara and Bamum); German Kamerun (1884–1916) (part of the German Empire); French Cameroun (1918–1960) (a League of Nations Mandate and later a United Nations Trust Territory administered by France); British Cameroons (1922–1961) (a League of Nations Mandate and later a United Nations Trust Territory administered by the United Kingdom); Federal Republic of Cameroon (1961–1972); United Republic of Cameroon (1972–1984); Republic of Cameroon (1984–present)
Cabo Verde	Before the discovery by the Portuguese, the archipelago was uninhabited; Portuguese Cape Verde, every island had its own captain (governor) (1462–1587) (part of the Portuguese Empire); Portuguese Cape Verde, unified colony (1587–1951) (part of the Portuguese Empire); Overseas Province of Cape Verde (1951–1975) (part of the Portuguese Empire); Republic of Cabo Verde (1975–present): In 2013, the government officially requested that the country be referred to as "Cabo Verde" in all international contexts, to better reflect its Portuguese language and cultural heritage. Nevertheless, the name "Cape Verde" continues to be widely used in various settings.
Central African Republic	Dar al Kuti (1836–1912); Ubangi-Shari (1903–1958) (part of the French Equatorial Africa, federation of colonial possessions of the French Empire); Central African Republic (1958–1976) (self-governing colony within the French Empire on 1 December 1958, full independent state on 13 August 1960); Central African Empire (1976–1979); Central African Republic (resumed) (1979–present)
Chad	The territory of Chad has been inhabited since the Paleolithic Era; Sao civilisation (600 BC – 700 AD); Kanem-Bornu Kingdom (c. 700 – 1902); Sultanate of Bagirmi (1480/1522–1897); Wadai Sultanate (1501–1912); French Chad (1900–1960) (part of French Equatorial Africa, federation of colonial possessions of the French Empire); Republic of Chad (1958–present) (self-governing colony within the French Empire on 28 November 1958, full independent state on 11 August 1960)
Comoros	The archipelago was first inhabited circa 1000 BC. The Comoros have been inhabited by various groups throughout this time.; Territory of the Comoros, part of the French Empire (1886–1912); Part of French Madagascar and Comoros, part of the French Empire (1912–1946); Separated administered as Territory of Comoros (1946–1975) (self-governing colony of the French Empire in 1961); State of Comoros, full independent state (1975–1978); Federal and Islamic Republic of Comoros (1978–2001); Union of the Comoros (2001–present) (federal state formed by three islands)
Congo, Republic of	Since 80,000 BC humans has been settled from with tribes, chiefdoms, confederations and kingdoms.; Kingdom of Kongo (1390–1914); Kakongo (15th ceuntry–1885); Kingdom of Loango (c. 1550 – c. 1883); French Congo (1882–1960) (part of French Equatorial Africa within the French Empire since 1910); Republic of the Congo (1958–1969) (self-governing colony of the French Empire on 15 September 1959, full independent state on 15 August 1960); People's Republic of the Congo (1969–1992); Republic of the Congo (resumed) (1992–present)
Congo, Democratic Republic of	Mpemba Kasi merging with Mbata Kingdom to form the Kingdom of Kongo (1390–1877); Kingdom of Ngoyo (15th century–1885); Kingdom of Luba (1585–1889); Kingdom of Lunda (c. 1600–1887); Anziku Kingdom (c. 1620–1880); Kuba Kingdom (1625–1884); Kingdom of Chokwe (1800–1891); Kingdom of Yeke (1856–1891); Congo Free State, state in personal union with the Kingdom of Belgium (a sovereign entity, a private domain of King Leopold II of Belgium) (1877–1908); Belgian Congo (1908–1960) (part of the Belgian Empire); Republic of the Congo (1960–1964); Democratic Republic of the Congo (1964–1971); Republic of Zaire (1971–1997); Democratic Republic of the Congo (1997–present) (resumed)
Côte d'Ivoire	Possibly since the Upper Paleolithic humans have been settled before 1460.; Divided into many states such as the Kong Empire (1710–1898) and the Kingdom of Sanwi (1740–1843) and having parts of states like Gyaaman (c. 1450–1895) and the Ashanti Empire (1670/1701–1821); Kabadougou Kingdom (1848–1980); French Ivory Coast (1893–1958) (part of French West Africa, federation of colonial possessions of the French Empire); Republic of Ivory Coast (1958–1960) (self-governing colony of the French Empire on 4 December 1959, full independent state on 7 August 1960); Republic of Côte d'Ivoire (1960–present), In the mid-1980s, the Ivorian government requested that the country be referred to only by its French name, "Côte d'Ivoire", in all languages, as an effort to assert national identity and linguistic sovereignty. Nevertheless, the name "Ivory Coast" is still commonly used in various settings.
Djibouti	The Djibouti area has been inhabited since the Neolithic.; Part of the Sultanate of Ifat (1285–1415); Principality of Dawaro; Part of the Sultanate of Adal (1415–1577); Part of the Egypt Eyalet, part of the Ottoman Empire (1577–1862); Ruled by Afar and Somali sultans (1862–1883); French Somaliland (1883–1967) (part of the French Empire: a French Colony (1896–1946), later a French Overseas Territory (1946–1967)); French Territory of the Afars and the Issas (1967–1977) (French Overseas Territory); Republic of Djibouti (1977–present)
Egypt	1st–2nd Dynasties of Ancient Egypt, the Early Dynastic Period (unified by Pharaoh Menes or probably Narmer, founder of the First Dynasty between Lower Egypt and Upper Egypt) (3150–2575 BC); 3rd–7th Dynasties of Ancient Egypt, the Old Kingdom of Egypt (2575–2150 BC); 8th–10th Dynasties of Ancient Egypt, the First Intermediate Period of Egypt: divided into many states (2181–2055 BC); 11th and 12th Dynasties of Ancient Egypt, reunified as the Middle Kingdom of Egypt (2055–1650 BC); 13th–17th Dynasties of Ancient Egypt, the Second Intermediate Period of Egypt: divided into many states (1650–1550 BC); 18th–20th Dynasties of Ancient Egypt, reunified as a New Kingdom of Egypt (1550–1069 BC); 21st–24th Dynasties of Ancient Egypt, the Third Intermediate Period of Egypt: divided into many states (1069–747 BC); 25th Dynasty of Egypt, also known as the Nubian Dynasty, part of the Kingdom of Kush (747–656 BC); 26th Dynasty of Late Period of Ancient Egypt, reunified the country (664–525 BC); First Egyptian Satrapy, part of the Achaemenid Empire as the 27th Dynasty (525–404 BC); 28th–30th Dynasties of Late Period of Ancient Egypt (404–343 BC); Second Egyptian Satrapy, part of the Achaemenid Empire as the 31st Dynasty (343–332 BC); Part of the Macedonian Empire (Argead dynasty) (332–323 BC); Ptolemaic Kingdom (332–30 BC); Province of Egypt (30 BC – 324 AD) (part of the Roman Empire); Province of Egypt (324–641) (part of the Eastern Roman Empire); Province of Egypt (619–629) (part of the Sasanian Empire); Part of the Rashidun Caliphate (641–661); Part of the Umayyad Caliphate (661–750); Part of the Abbasid Caliphate (750–868); Tulunid Emirate of Egypt, the first independent dynasty to rule Egypt since the Ptolemaic dynasty, still de jure under the Abbasid Caliphate (868–905); Part of the Abbasid Caliphate (868–935); Ikhshidid State of Egypt, Syria and Hejaz, autonomous state within the Abbasid Caliphate (935–969); Part of the Fatimid Caliphate (969–973); Center of the Fatimid Caliphate, second independent dynasty of Egypt in the Middle Ages (973–1171); Center of the Ayyubid Sultanate of Egypt and Syria (Ayyubid Sultanate of Egypt, after the death of Saladin), third independent dynasty of Egypt in the Middle Ages (1171–1174); Part of the Ayyubid Sultanate of Egypt (1174–1218); Center of the Ayyubid Sultanate of Egypt (1218–1250); Mamluk Sultanate of Egypt (two independent dynasties: Baḥrī and Burjī) (1250–1517); Eyalet of Egypt, eyalet (state) of the Ottoman Empire (1517–1867) (the Muhammad Ali dynasty became the hereditary governors [Wali] of the eyalet in 1805); Occupied by the First French Empire (1798–1801); Khedivate of Egypt, a de jure Ottoman autonomous viceroyalty (the viceroy [khedive] was from the Muhammad Ali dynasty) (Occupied by the British Empire from 1882 to 1922) (1867–1914); Sultanate of Egypt (Muhammad Ali dynasty), part of the British Empire (British protectorate) (1914–1922); Kingdom of Egypt (Muhammad Ali dynasty) (1922–1953); Arab Republic of Egypt (1953–1958); United Arab Republic (in union with Syria) (1958–1971); Arab Republic of Egypt (1971–present)
Equatorial Guinea	The first inhabitants of the region that is now Equatorial Guinea are believed to have been Pygmies, of whom only isolated pockets remain in northern Río Muni. Bantu peoples arrived in the region between the 17th and 19th centuries.; The Annobón population, originally from Angola, were brought by the Portuguese via São Tomé.; Part of the Portuguese Empire (1474–1778); Spanish Guinea (1778–1968) (part of the Spanish Empire); Republic of Equatorial Guinea (1968–present)
Eritrea	Part of Dʿmt (c. 980 BC – c. 400 BC); Part of the Kingdom of Aksum (c. 100 AD – c. 940 AD); Sultanate of Dahlak (late 11th century–1557); Medri Bahri kingdom (1137–1889); Part of the Ottoman Empire (1555–1879); Part of the Ethiopian Empire (1879–1889); Colony of Eritrea (1890–1936) (part of the Italian Empire); Part of Italian East Africa (1936–1941) (part of the Italian Empire); British Occupation of Eritrea (1941–1952); Federation of Ethiopia and Eritrea (1952–1962); Part of Ethiopia (1962–1993); State of Eritrea (1993–present)
Eswatini (Swaziland)	Kingdom of Swaziland (1740s–1906); Protectorate of Swaziland (1906–1968) (part of the British Empire); Kingdom of Swaziland (1968–2018); Kingdom of Eswatini (2018–present)
Ethiopia	Kingdom of D'mt (c. 980 BC – c. 400 BC); Kingdom of Aksum (c. 80 BC – c. 940 AD); Kingdom of Semien (c. 325–1627); Harla Kingdom (501–1500); Sultanate of Shewa (896–1286); Kingdom of Damot (900–1317); Zagwe dynasty (900–1270); Sultanate of Bale (13th century – 1320s); Hadiya Sultanate (13th–19th century); Part of the Sultanate of Ifat (1285–1415); Kingdom of Kaffa (1390–1897); Adal Sultanate (1415–1577); Ennarea (14th century – 1710); Imamate of Aussa (1577–1672); Emirate of Harar (1647–1887); Sultanate of Aussa (1734–1936); Ethiopian Empire (1137–1936; 1941–1974) (also known as Abyssinian Empire before World War II); Kingdom of Gumma (1770–1902); Kingdom of Gomma (1780–1886); Kingdom of Jimma (1790–1932); Kingdom of Limmu-Ennarea (1801–1891); Kingdom of Gera (1835–1887); Part of Italian East Africa (1936–1941) (part of the Italian Empire); Socialist Ethiopia, officially the Provisional Military Government of Ethiopia (1974–1987); People's Democratic Republic of Ethiopia (1987–1991); Transitional Government of Ethiopia (1991–1995); Federal Democratic Republic of Ethiopia (1995–present) (a federal state formed by 10 regional states and 2 chartered cities)
Gabon	The earliest inhabitants of the area were Pygmy peoples. They were largely replaced and absorbed by tribal Bantu peoples as they migrated; Kingdom of Orungu (1700–1927); Part of the French Empire as a protectorate (1839–1910); French Gabon (1910–1958) (part of French Equatorial Africa, federation of colonial possessions of the French Empire); Gabonese Republic (1958–1960) (self-governing colony of the French Empire on 28 November 1958, full independent state on 17 August 1960); Gabonese Republic, full independent state (1960–present)
Gambia	Kingdom of Kombo (1271–1875); Part of the Mali Empire (1287–1480); Gambia Colony and Protectorate (1821–1965) (part of the British Empire); The Gambia, monarchical state in personal union with the United Kingdom (1965–1970); Republic of The Gambia (1970–1982); Republic of The Gambia, in union with Senegal in the Senegambia Confederation (1982–1989); Republic of The Gambia (1989–2015); Islamic Republic of The Gambia (2015–2017); Republic of The Gambia (2017–present) (resumed)
Ghana	From the 13th century, Akans emerged from what is believed to have been the Bonoman area, to create several Akan states of Ghana, mainly based on gold trading. These states included Bonoman, Kingdom of Ashanti, Denkyira, Mankessim Kingdom, Fante Confederacy and Akwamu.; Kingdom of Dagbon (1250–1888); Mankessim Kingdom (1252–1844); Kingdom of Wala (1317–1894); Portuguese Gold Coast (1482–1642) (part of the Portuguese Empire); Dutch Gold Coast (1598–1872) (part of the Dutch Empire); Danish Gold Coast (1658–1850) (part of the Danish Empire); Swedish Gold Coast (1650–1663) (part of the Swedish Empire); Ashanti Empire (1670–1821); Branderberger/Prussian Gold Coast (1682–1721) (colony of Brandenburg-Prussia, later Prussia); British Gold Coast (1821–1957) (part of the British Empire); Dominion of Ghana, monarchical state in personal union with the United Kingdom (1957–1960); Republic of Ghana (1960–present)
Guinea	Center of the Mali Empire (1230–1559) (capital city in Niani, Guinea); Part of the Mali Empire (1559–1610) (capital city moved to Kangaba, Mali); Imamate of Futa Jallon (1725–1896); Wassoulou Kingdom (1878–1898); French Guinea (1894–1958) (in 1904 became a part of the French West Africa, a federation of colonial possessions of the French Empire); Republic of Guinea (1958–1979); People's Revolutionary Republic of Guinea (1979–1984); Republic of Guinea (1984–present) (resumed)
Guinea-Bissau	Part of the Mali Empire (1251–1537); Kaabu Kingdom (1537–1867); Portuguese Guinea (1474–1879), dependency of Portuguese Cape Verde (part of the Portuguese Empire); Portuguese Guinea, colony separated from Cape Verde (part of the Portuguese Empire); Overseas Province of Guinea (1951–1972) (part of the Portuguese Empire); State of Guinea (1972–1974) (part of the Portuguese Empire); Republic of Guinea-Bissau (1973–present) – The country declared independence in 1973 (recognized by Portugal in 1974 after the Carnation Revolution).
Kenya	What is now Kenya has been inhabited by humans since the Paleolithic period.; As Bantu city-states settled on the coast, several nomadic tribes inhabited the rest of what is today Kenya.; c. 1st century AD: The Kenyan coast had served host to communities of ironworkers and communities of Bantu subsistence farmers, hunters, and fishers who supported the economy with agriculture, fishing, metal production, and trade with foreign countries. These communities formed the earliest city-states (like Mombasa and Malindi) in the region which were collectively known as Azania.; Part of the Kilwa Sultanate (957–1513); Part of the Portuguese Empire (1505–1698); Part of the Omani Empire (1698–1856); Part of the Sultanate of Zanzibar (1856–1895); East Africa Protectorate (1895–1920) (part of the British Empire); Colony and Protectorate of Kenya (1920–1963) (part of the British Empire); Kenya, a monarchical state in personal union with the United Kingdom (1963–1964); Republic of Kenya (1964–present)
Lesotho	Kingdom of Lesotho (1822–1884); Basutoland (1884–1966) (part of the British Empire); Kingdom of Lesotho (resumed) (1966–present)
Liberia	Colony of Liberia (1821–1847); Republic of Liberia (1847–present)
Libya	Archaeological evidence indicates that the coastal plain was inhabited by Neolithic peoples (ancestors to the Bebers) from as early as 8000 BC.; Phoenicians and Ancient Greeks arrived in the country in the 7th century BC and established colonies and cities. The Phoenicians are fixed in Tripolitania, and the Greeks in Cyrenaica. Fezzan was home to a Beber people known as Garamantes; Divided between the Achaemenid Empire (Satrapy of Libya; Cyrenaica) and the Carthaginian Monarchy, later the Carthaginian Republic (Tripolitania) (525–331 BC); Divided between the Empire of Alexander the Great (Cyrenaica) and the Carthaginian Republic (Tripolitania) (331–323 BC); Divided between the Ptolemaic Kingdom of Egypt (Cyrenaica) and the Carthaginian Republic (Tripolitania) (323–201 BC); Part of the Ptolemaic Kingdom of Egypt (Cyrenaica) (201–107 BC); Divided between the Ptolemaic Kingdom of Egypt (Cyrenaica) and the Roman Republic (Tripolitania) (107–95 BC); Africa proconsularis (Tripolitania) and Crete and Cyrenaica (later divided into Libya Pentapolis and Libya sicaa), provinces of the Roman Republic (later the Roman Empire) (97 BC – AD 395); Divided between the Eastern Roman Empire (provinces of Libya Pentapolis and Libya sicca) and the Western Roman Empire (province of Tripolitania) (395–439); Divided between the Eastern Roman Empire (provinces of Libya Pentapolis and Libya sicca) and the Vandal Kingdom (Tripolitania) (439–533); Part of the Exarchate of Africa (553–648) (part of the Eastern Roman Empire); Part of the Rashidun Caliphate (648–656); Part of the Umayyad Caliphate (663–683); Divided between the Umayyad Caliphate (Cyrenaica) and the Eastern Roman Empire (Tripolitania) (683–694); Part of the Umayyad Caliphate (694–750); Part of the Abbasid Caliphate (750–800); Divided between the Abbasid Caliphate (Cyrenaica) and the Aghlabid Emirate (Tripolitania) (800–868); Divided between the Tulunid Emirate (Cyrenaica) and the Aghlabid Emirate (Tripolitania) (868–906); Divided between the Abbasid Caliphate (Cyrenaica) and the Aghlabid Emirate (Tripolitania) (906–909); Divided between the Abbasid Caliphate (Cyrenaica) and the Fatimid Caliphate (Tripolitania) (909–969); Part of the Fatimid Caliphate (969–945); Divided between the Abbasid Caliphate (Cyrenaica) and the Fatimid Caliphate (Tripolitania) (945–961); Part of the Fatimid Caliphate (961–973); Divided between the Fatimid Caliphate (Cyrenaica) and the Zirid Emirate (Tripolitania) (973–1051); Inhabited by Arabic and Berber tribes (1051–1148); Part of the Kingdom of Africa (Tripolitania) (1148–1159); Part of the Almohad Caliphate (Tripolitania) (1159–1184); Inhabited by Arabic and Berber tribes (1184–1404); Fezzan, part of the Kanem Bornu Kingdom (c. 1400s – c. 1600s); Part of the Sultanate of Tunis (Tripolitania) (1404–1551); Eyalet of Tripolitania (1551–1864) (eyalet (state) of the Ottoman Empire); Vilayet of Tripolitania (1864–1912) (vilayet (province) of the Ottoman Empire); Italian Libya (1911–1943) (part of the Italian Empire); Tripolitanian Republic (1918–1922); British Military Administration of Libya (1942–1951) (part of the Allied administration of Libya); French Military Territory of Fezzan-Ghadames (1943–1951) (part of the Allied administration of Libya); Emirate of Cyrenaica (1949–1951); Kingdom of Libya (1951–1969) (called United Kingdom of Libya until 1963); Libyan Arab Republic (1969–1977); Great Socialist People's Libyan Arab Jamahiriya (1977–2011) (before 1986 without the word "Great" in the full name of the country); State of Libya (2011–present)
Madagascar	Human settlement of Madagascar occurred between 350 BC and 550 AD by Indianized Austronesian peoples, arriving on outrigger canoes from Indonesia.; Around the 9th century AD Bantu migrants crossed the Mozambique Channel from East Africa.; By the Middle Ages, over a dozen predominant ethnic identities had emerged on the island, typified by rule under a local chieftain. Among some communities, such as the Sakalava, Merina and Betsimisaraka, leaders seized the opportunity to unite these disparate communities and establish true kingdoms under their rule.; The island of Madagascar was divided into many states, including the Kingdom of Imerina (1540–1840), Guingemaro and Boina Kingdom (1690–1840); Most of the island was unified by the Kingdom of Imerina (1840–1882); Malagasy Protectorate (1882–1897) (part of the French Empire); Colony of Madagascar and Dependencies (1897–1958) (part of the French Empire); Malagasy Republic (1958–1960) (self-governing colony of the French Empire on 14 October 1958, full independent state on 26 June 1960); Malagasy Republic (1960–1975); Democratic Republic of Madagascar (1975–1992); Third Republic of Madagascar (1992–2010); Republic of Madagascar (2010–present)
Malawi	The part of Africa now known as Malawi was settled by migrating Bantu groups around the 10th century.; Kingdom of Maravi (1480–1891); British Central Africa Protectorate (1893–1907) (part of the British Empire); Nyasaland Protectorate (1907–1953; 1963–1964) (part of the British Empire); Part of the Federation of Rhodesia and Nyasaland (1953–1964), a federation of colonial possessions of the British Empire; Malawi, monarchical state in personal union with the United Kingdom (1964–1966); Republic of Malawi (1966–present)
Mali	Djenné-Djenno (250 BC – 900 AD); Ghana Empire, properly known as Wagadou (c. 300 – c. 1200s); Gao Kingdom (c. 800s – 1430); Sosso Empire (c. 1200–1235); Part of the Mali Empire (c. 1240–1559) (capital city in Niani, Guinea); Center of the Mali Empire (1559–1610) (capital city moved to Kangaba, Mali); Songhai Empire (c. 1464–1591); Kénédougou Kingdom (c. 1600–1880); Bamana Kingdom (also known as Ségou Kingdom) (1712–1862); Kingdom of Kaarta (1754–1904); Caliphate of Hamdullahi (1818–1862); Tidjaniya Caliphate (1848–1893); Part of the (Wassoulou Empire) Wassoulou Kingdom (1878–1898); French Sudan (1880–1958) (part of French West Africa, a federation of colonial possessions of the French Empire; 1902–1904 referred as Senegambia and Niger; 1904–1921 referred as Upper Senegal and Niger); Sudanese Republic (1958–1960) (self-governing colony of the French Empire from 24 November 1958 until 20 June 1960); Federated state of the Mali Federation (1960) (united with Senegal from June to August 1960); Republic of Mali (1960–present)
Mauritania	Inhabited by various Berber tribes; Part of the Ghana Empire (c. 300–1076); Part of the Almoravid Emirate (1076–1086); Part of the Ghana Empire (1086 – c. early 1200s); Southern regions are part of the Mali Empire (c. early 1200s – early 1500s); Southern regions are part of the Songhai Empire (early 1500s – early 1600s); Inhabited by various Berber and Arabic tribes (1600s–1903); Emirate of Trarza, a small emirate in the southwestern of modern-day Mauritania (1640–1902); Colony of Mauritania, part of the French West Africa (a federation of French colonial territories), part of the French Empire (1903–1958); Republic of Mauritania (self-governing colony of the French Empire on 28 November 1958, full independent state on 28 November 1960) (1958–1960); Islamic Republic of Mauritania (1960–present)
Mauritius	Dutch Mauritius (1638–1710); Isle de France (part of the French Empire) (1715–1810); British Mauritius (part of the British Empire) (1810–1968); Mauritius, monarchical state in personal union with the United Kingdom (1968–1992); Republic of Mauritius (1992–present)
Morocco	The recorded history of Morocco begins with the Phoenician colonization of the Moroccan coast between the 8th and 6th centuries BC, although the area was inhabited by indigenous Berbers for some two thousand years before that.; In the 5th century BC, the city-state of Carthage extended its hegemony over the coastal areas. They remained there until the late 3rd century BC, while the hinterland was ruled by indigenous monarchs.; Center of the Kingdom of Mauretania (capital city in Volubilis, located in modern day Morocco) (c. 300 BC – 25 BC); Part of the Kingdom of Mauretania (capital city in Cherchell, located in modern day Algeria) (25–42 BC); Mauretania Tingitana, province of the Roman Empire (42–395); Mauretania Tingitana, province of the Eastern Roman Empire (395 – c. 700); Part of the Umayyad Caliphate (c. 700–744); Barghawata Confederacy (744–1058); Emirate of Sigilmasa (757–976); Emirate of Nekor (710–1019); Idrisid Emirate of Morocco (788–974); Sulaymanid dynasty (814–922); Almoravid Emirate of Morocco (1040–1147); Almohad Caliphate (1121–1269); Marinid Sultanate of Morocco (1244–1465); Wattasid Sultanate of Morocco (1472–1554); Saadi Sultanate of Morocco (1549–1659); Alaouite Sultanate of Morocco (1666–1912); French protectorate in Morocco (1912–1955) (part of the French Empire); Spanish protectorate in Morocco (1912–1956) (part of the Spanish Empire); Tangier International Zone (1924–1956); Kingdom of Morocco (1956–present)
Mozambique	What is now Mozambique has been inhabited by humans since the Paleolithic period.; From the late first millennium AD, vast Indian Ocean trade networks extended as far south into Mozambique as evidenced by the ancient port town of Chibuene; Bantu city-states in the coast participated in the incipient Swahili culture. In what is now Mozambique, the city-states of Sofala, Angoche, and Mozambique Island were regional powers by the 15th century. The interior of the country continued to be inhabited by tribal peoples (except by some areas conquered by the Kingdom of Mutapa); Captaincy of Sofala (1505–1725) (dependency of the Portuguese State of India, part of the Portuguese Empire); Captaincy of Mozambique and Sofala (1569–1752) (dependency of the Portuguese State of India, part of the Portuguese Empire); Captaincy-General of Mozambique, Sofala and Rivers of Sena (1752–1836) (independent of the governor of the Portuguese State of India, part of the Portuguese Empire); Province of Mozambique (1836–1891) (part of the Portuguese Empire); State of Eastern Africa (1891–1893) (part of the Portuguese Empire); Province of Mozambique (1893–1926) (part of the Portuguese Empire); Colony of Mozambique (1926–1951) (part of the Portuguese Empire); Province of Mozambique (1951–1972) (part of the Portuguese Empire); State of Mozambique (1973–1975) (part of the Portuguese Empire); People's Republic of Mozambique (1975–1990); Republic of Mozambique (1990–present)
Namibia	Namibia has been inhabited since early times by the San, Damara and Nama people. Around the 14th century, immigrating Bantu peoples arrived as part of the Bantu expansion.; German South West Africa (1884–1915) (part of the German Empire); South West Africa (1915–1990) (a League of Nations mandate administered by South Africa, known as Namibia by the UN since 1968); Republic of Namibia (1990–present)
Niger	Regions around the Lake Chad was part of the Kingdom of Bornu (c. 1000 – 1902); Western regions of what is today modern Niger were part of the Mali Empire (1288–1340); Western regions of what is today modern Niger were part of the Songhai Empire (1340–1591); Southern regions of what is today Niger were part of several Hausa Kingdoms (c. 1400s – c. 1800s) (the capital cities of these kingdoms were located in modern Nigeria); Sultanate of Agadez (1449–1500; 1591–1900); Dendi Kingdom (rump state that succeeded the Songhai Empire) (1591–1901); Sultanate of Damagaram (1731–1902); Dosso Kingdom (c. 1750–1902); Emirate of Say (1825–1860); Zabarma Emirate (1860–1897); Senegambia and Niger (1902–1904) (part of the French West Africa, federation of colonial possessions of the French Empire); Upper Senegal and Niger (1904–1921) (within French West Africa); Colony of Niger (1922–1960) (within French West Africa); Republic of Niger (self-governing colony of the French Empire on 18 December 1958, full independent state on 3 August 1960) (1958–1960); Republic of Niger (1960–present)
Nigeria	The Nok Culture appeared in Nigeria around 1500 BC and vanished under unknown circumstances around 500 AD, having lasted approximately 1,000 years.; Kingdom of Nri (948–1911); Kingdom of Benin (1180–1897); Ife Empire (1200–1420); Oron nation (1200–1909); Oyo Empire (c. 1300s – 1896); Northeastern regions of what is today Nigeria was part of the Kingdom of Bornu (1380–1893); Northern regions of what is today Nigeria were part of several Hausa Kingdoms (c. 1400s – c. 1800s) (these kingdoms are predecessor states to some federated states of modern Nigeria); Ijebu Kingdom (c. 1400–present); Kingdom of Warri (1480–1848); Kwararafa (c. 1500s–1840); Igala Kingdom (c. 1550–1900); Kalabari Kingdom; Ibom Kingdom (1630–1902); Nembe Kingdom; Akwa Akpa (c. 1650–1884); Bida Emirate (1731–1897); Wukari Federation (c. 1840 – c. 1900); Aro Confederacy (1690–1902); Kano Emirate (1807–1903); Sokoto Caliphate (1804–1903); Niger Coast Protectorate (1884–1900) (originally established as the Oil Rivers Protectorate 1884–1893, part of the British Empire); Lagos Colony (1862–1906) (part of the British Empire); Northern Nigeria Protectorate (1900–1914) (part of the British Empire); Southern Nigeria Protectorate (1900–1914) (part of the British Empire); Colony and Protectorate of Nigeria (1914–1960) (part of the British Empire); Federation of Nigeria (1960–1963), a federal monarchical state in personal union with the United Kingdom; Federal Republic of Nigeria (1963–present) (a federal state formed by 36 states and 1 federal capital city)
Rwanda	Kingdom of Rwanda (c. 1400s – 1891) (in the 19th century conquered and unified the other kingdoms of the region); Bukunzi; Kingdom of Rwanda, part of German East Africa (1891–1919) (part of the German Empire); Kingdom of Rwanda, part of the Mandate of Ruanda-Urundi (1922–1962) (a League of Nations mandate territory administered by Belgium); Kingdom of Rwanda, part of the Trust Territory of Ruanda-Urundi (1946–1962) (a United Nations Trust Territory administered by Belgium); Kingdom of Rwanda (1962) (independent state); Republic of Rwanda (1962–present)
São Tomé and Príncipe	Before the discovery by the Portuguese, the archipelago was uninhabited; Portuguese São Tomé and Príncipe, every island had its own governor (1470–1752) (part of the Portuguese Empire); Portuguese São Tomé and Príncipe, unified colony (1752–1951) (part of the Portuguese Empire); Overseas Province of São Tomé and Príncipe (1951–1975) (part of the Portuguese Empire); Democratic Republic of São Tomé and Príncipe (1975–present)
Senegal	Kingdom of Takrur (c. 800 – c. 1285); Part of the Mali Empire (c. 1285 – 1350); Jolof Empire (1350–1549); Kingdom of Waalo (1287–1855); Kingdom of Sine (c. 1300s – 1959); Kingdom of Saloum (1494–1969); Empire of Great Fulo, also known as Denanke Kingdom (1490–1776); Jolof Kingdom (1549–1875); Kingdom of Cayor (1579–1879); Kingdom of Baoul (1555–1874); Khasso (17th–19th century); Imamate of Futa Toro (1776–1861); Senegambia (1617–1678) (part of the Dutch Empire); French Senegal (1659–1895) (part of the French Empire); Fuladu (1865–1903); French Senegal (1895–1958) (part of French West Africa, a federation of colonial possessions of the French Empire); Republic of Senegal (1958–1960) (self-governing colony of the French Empire from 25 November 1958 until 4 April 1960); Federated state of the Mali Federation (1960) (united with Mali from June to August 1960); Republic of Senegal (1960–1982); Senegal, in union with The Gambia in the Senegambia Confederation (1982–1989); Republic of Senegal (1960–present)
Seychelles	Before discovery by the Portuguese in the 15th century, the archipelago was uninhabited; Isle of Seychelles (1770–1810) (part of the French Empire); Colony of Seychelles (1903–1976) (part of the British Empire); Republic of Seychelles (1976–present)
Sierra Leone	Kingdom of Koya, also known as Koya Temne and Temne Kingdom (1505–1896); Sierra Leone Colony and Protectorate (1808–1961) (part of the British Empire); Sierra Leone (1961–1971), a monarchical state in personal union with the United Kingdom; Republic of Sierra Leone (1971–present)
Somalia	Land of Punt (legendary, mentioned by Ancient Egyptian sources); Macrobian Kingdom (legendary, mentioned by the Ancient Greek historian Herodotus; City-states were established on the coast of what is now Somalia. Examples are Mosylon, Opone, Malao, Sarapion, Mundus and Essina (c. 100 AD – c. 500 AD); Tunni Sultanate (800s–1200s); Sultanate of Mogadishu (c. 900 – 1500s); Ajuran Sultanate (c. 1200 – 1696s); Warsangali Sultanate (1218–1886); Ifat Sultanate (1285–1415); Adal Sultanate (1415–1577); Emirate of Harar (1647–1887); Gadabuursi Ughazate (1607–1885); Geledi Sultanate (1696 − 1911); Hiraab Imamate (1696–1890); Isaaq Sultanate (1749–1884); Majerteen Sultanate (c. 1800 – 1924); Sultanate of Hobyo (1884–1925); Italian Somaliland (1889–1936) (part of the Italian Empire); Dervish state (1889–1920); Part of Italian East Africa (1936–1941) (part of the Italian Empire); British Military Administration (Somaliland) (1941–1949); Trust Territory of Somaliland (1950–1960) (a United Nations Trust Territory administered by Italy); British Somaliland (1884–1940; 1941–1960) (part of the British Empire); State of Somaliland (1960); Somali Republic (1960–1969); Somali Democratic Republic (1969–1991); Republic of Somalia (1991–2012) (no central government existed; notable regimes included the Interim Government of Somalia 1991–1997, the Transitional National Government of Somalia 2000–2004, the Transitional Federal Government of Somalia 2004–2012); Federal Republic of Somalia (2012–present) (a federal state formed by 7 federal state members)
South Africa	Before the Bantu expansion, Khoisan peoples were the first inhabitants of Southern Africa.; Various Bantu peoples migrated and settled in the territory of the future South Africa (300–500 AD); Kingdom of Mapungubwe (c. 1075 – c. 1220); Dutch Cape Colony (1652–1806) (part of the Dutch Empire); Mthethwa Paramountcy (c. 1780 – 1817) (independent state); Cape Colony (1806–1910) (part of the British Empire); Zulu Kingdom (1816–1897) (independent state); Natalia Republic (1839–1843) (independent state); Colony of Natal (1843–1910) (part of the British Empire); South African Republic (1852–1877; 1881–1902; 1914–1915) (independent state); Transvaal Colony (1877–1881; 1902–1910) (part of the British Empire); Orange Free State (1854–1902) (independent state); State of Goshen (1882–1883) (independent state); Republic of Stellaland (later United States of Stellaland; 1882–1885) (independent state); Orange River Colony (1902–1910) (part of the British Empire); Union of South Africa (1910–1931), a Dominion within the British Empire; Union of South Africa (1931–1961), a monarchical state in personal union with the United Kingdom; Republic of South Africa (1961–present)
South Sudan	The territory of South Sudan has been inhabited since the Paleolithic Era, hosting a wide variety of ethnic groups, tribes and the Shilluk Kingdom (c. 1400s – 1861), a small kingdom located in the north of the country; Part of Anglo-Egyptian Sudan (1899–1956); Part of Republic of the Sudan (1956–1969); Part of Democratic Republic of the Sudan (1969–1985); Part of Republic of the Sudan (resumed) (1985–2011); Republic of South Sudan (2011–present) (a federal state formed by 10 States, 2 administrative areas and 1 area with special administrative status)
Sudan	Kingdom of Kerma (c. 2500 BC – c. 1500 BC); Part of the New Kingdom of Egypt (c. 1500 BC – c. 1070 BC); Kingdom of Kush (c. 1070 BC – c. 350 BC); Blemmyes (c. 600 BC – c. 800 AD); Kingdom of Makuria (c. 400s – 1600s); Kingdom of Nobatia (c. 400s – c. 700s); Kingdom of Alodia (c. 700s – c. 1500); Daju Kingdom (c. 1100s – 1400s); Kingdom of al-Abwab (13th–15th/16th century); Tunjur Kingdom (1400s – c. 1650); Kingdom of Fazughli (1500–1685); Funj Sultanate, also known as Sultanate of Sennar and Blue Sultanate (1504–1821); Sultanate of Darfur (1603–1874; 1898–1916); Part of the Eyalet of Egypt, that itself was part of the Ottoman Empire (1821–1867); Part of the Khedivate of Egypt, a de jure Ottoman autonomous viceroyalty (1867–1885); Mahdist State (1885–1898); Anglo-Egyptian Sudan (1898–1956) (condominium of the United Kingdom and Egypt); Republic of the Sudan (1956–1969); Democratic Republic of the Sudan (1969–1985); Republic of the Sudan (1985–2019); Republic of the Sudan (resumed) (2019–present) (a federal state formed by 18 States and 1 area with special administrative status)
Tanzania	Bantu city-states settled on the coast, several nomadic tribes inhabited the rest of what is today Tanzania.; Kilwa Sultanate, in the coast of modern-day Tanzania (957–1513); Kingdom of Karagwe (1450–1963); Part of the Portuguese Mozambique, part of the Portuguese Empire (1513–1696); Chagga states (1600–1963); Part of the Omani Empire (1696–1856); Kilindi dynasty (1790s – 1862); Sultanate of Zanzibar, in the coast of modern-day Tanzania (1856–1964) (British protectorate 1890–1963); German East Africa (1891–1919) (part of the German Empire); Tanganyika Territory (1922–1961) (part of the British Empire); Republic of Tanganyika (1961–1964); People's Republic of Zanzibar (1964); United Republic of Tanganyika and Zanzibar (1964); United Republic of Tanzania (1964–present)
Togo	German Togoland (1884–1916) (part of the German Empire); British Togoland (1916–1956) (League of Nations Mandate Territory and later a United Nations Trust Territory, administered by the United Kingdom); French Togoland (1916–1960) (League of Nations Mandate Territory and later a United Nations Trust Territory, administered by France); Togolese Republic (1960–present)
Tunisia	Catharginian Monarchy (c. 814 BC – c. 480 BC); Catharginian Republic (c. 480 BC – 146 BC); Africa Proconsularis, province of the Roman Republic (later the Roman Empire) (146 BC – 395 AD); Africa Proconsularis, province of the Eastern Roman Empire (395–439); Vandal Kingdom (439–533); Praetorian prefecture of Africa, part of the Eastern Roman Empire (534–590); Exarchate of Africa, part of the Eastern Roman Empire (590–698); Part of the Umayyad Caliphate (698–750); Part of the Abbasid Caliphate (750–800); Aghlabid Emirate (800–909) (semi-independent emirate, nominally vassal or subject of the Abbasids, but de facto independent since 801); Center of the Fatimid Caliphate (909–973) (the capital city was located in modern Tunisia); Zirid Emirate, Vassal of the Fatimid Caliphate (973–1048) (the Fatimid Caliphate moved its capital city to Cairo, located in modern Egypt); Zirid Emirate, independent state (1048–1148); Khurasanid dynasty (1058–1159); Kingdom of Africa (1148 – c. 1158); Part of the Almohad Caliphate (c. 1158–1229); Hafsid Sultanate of Tunis (1229–1574); Eyalet of Tunis (1574–1705) (eyalet (state) of the Ottoman Empire); Beylik of Tunis (1705–1881) (beylik (principality) of the Ottoman Empire); French protectorate of Tunisia (1881–1956) (part of the French Empire); Kingdom of Tunisia (1956–1957); Republic of Tunisia (1957–present)
Uganda	The territory of Uganda has been inhabited since the Paleolithic Era; Bantu peoples migrated and settled the region during the Bantu expansion (c. 300 BC – c. 400 AD); Empire of Kitara (? – 1300s); After the fall of the Empire of Kitara several kingdoms and chiefdoms were established in what is today Uganda: Kingdom of Buganda, Bunyoro Kitara-Kingdom, Kingdom of Busoga, Kingdom of Rwenzururu, the Tooro Kingdom, the Kingdom of Ankole, the Kingdom of Kooki, the Chiefdom of Bunya and the Alur Kingdom (c. 1300s – 1894); Uganda Protectorate (1894–1962) (part of the British Empire); Uganda, monarchical state in personal union with the United Kingdom (1962–1963); Republic of Uganda (1963–present)
Zambia	Southern regions of what is today Zambia were part of Great Zimbabwe (c. 1300s – c. 1430s); Eastern regions of what is today Zambia were part of the Kingdom of Maravi (c. 1480s – c. 1720s); Kingdom of Barotseland (c. 1600s – 1890); Northwestern regions of what is today Zambia were part of the Lunda Kingdom (c. 1700s–1800s); Part of British South Africa Company Territories (1890–1924) (part of the British Empire); Northern Rhodesia Protectorate (1924–1953; 1963–1964) (part of the British Empire); Part of the Federation of Rhodesia and Nyasaland (1953–1963), a federation of colonial possession of the British Empire; Republic of Zambia (1964–present)
Zimbabwe	Southern regions of what is today Zimbabwe was part of the Kingdom of Mapungubwe (c. 1075 – c. 1220); Kingdom of Zimbabwe (1220–1450); Kingdom of Mutapa (1430–1760); Kingdom of Butua (1450 – c. 1683); Rozvi Empire (1660–1889); Kingdom of Mthwakazi (1823–1894); Part of British South Africa Company Territories (1890–1923) (part of the British Empire); Colony of Southern Rhodesia (1923–1953; 1963–1965; 1979–1980) (part of the British Empire); Part of the Federation of Rhodesia and Nyasaland (1953–1963), a federation of colonial possessions of the British Empire; Rhodesia (1965–1979) (unilateral declaration of independence;from 1970 to 1979 Republic of Rhodesia); Zimbabwe Rhodesia (1979); Republic of Zimbabwe (1980–present)

== See also ==
- List of sovereign states and dependent territories in Africa
- Decolonisation of Africa
- Succession of states
