= List of predecessors of sovereign states in North America =

This is a list of all present sovereign states in North America and their predecessors. The division between North and South America is unclear, generally viewed as lying somewhere in the Isthmus of Panama, however, the Caribbean Islands, Central America including the whole of Panama is considered to be part of North America as its southernmost nation. The continent was colonized by the Europeans: Mainly by the Spaniards, the French, the English and the Dutch. The United States of America gained its independence in American Revolutionary War; most of nations in Central America gained independence in the early 19th century; Canada and many other island countries in the Caribbean Sea (most of them were British colonies) gained their independence in 20th century. Today, North America consists of twenty-two sovereign states.

Sovereign state	Predecessors
Antigua and Barbuda	Colony of Antigua and Colony of Barbuda (1671–1816; 1833–1958) (part of the British Leeward Islands); Part of the West Indies Federation (1958–1962); Colony of Antigua (1962–1981) (Associated State since 1967); Antigua and Barbuda (1981–present) (Commonwealth realm)
Bahamas, The	Colony of the Bahamas (1648–1717); Colony of the Bahamas (1717–1973); Commonwealth of the Bahamas (1973–present)
Barbados	Colony of Barbados (1625–1885) (part of the British Windward Islands); Colony of Barbados (1885–1958; 1962–1966) (separated Crown colony); Part of the West Indies Federation (1958–1962); Barbados (1966–present)
Belize	British Honduras (1862–1973); Belize (1973–1981) (British self-governing colony); Belize (1981–present) (Commonwealth realm)
Canada	Hundreds of First Nations, some of which have domestic national governments New France (1535–1763) (a French colony); Province of Quebec (1763–1791); Provinces of Upper Canada and Lower Canada (1791–1841); United Province of Canada (1841–1867); Rupert's Land (1670–1870) (a territory of the Hudson's Bay Company); North-Western Territory (1859–1870); Colony of British Columbia (1858–1871) (included the Colony of Vancouver Island and former British Columbia since 1866); Provisional Government of Saskatchewan (1885) (unrecognized Métis republic defeated in the North-West Rebellion); Newfoundland Colony (1610–1907); Dominion of Newfoundland (1907–1949) (a dominion within British Empire 1907–1934, a dependency of United Kingdom 1934–1949); Canada (1867–present) (before the Second World War the term Dominion of Canada was also used)
Costa Rica	Part of the Real Audiencia of Guatemala (1543–1609) (part of New Spain); Part of the Captaincy General of Guatemala (1609–1821) (part of New Spain); Part of the Mexican Empire (1822–1823); Part of the Federal Republic of Central America (1823–1838); Free State of Costa Rica (1838–1847); First Costa Rican Republic (1848–1948); Second Costa Rican Republic (1949–present)
Cuba	Part of the Captaincy General of Santo Domingo (1512–1607); Captaincy General of Cuba (1607–1898); United States Military Government in Cuba (1898–1902); Republic of Cuba (1902–1959); Republic of Cuba (1959–present)
Dominica	Colony of Dominica (part of the British Leeward Islands 1871–1958) (1763–1958); Part of the West Indies Federation (1958–1962); Dominica (1962–1978) (Associated State since 1967); Commonwealth of Dominica (1978–present)
Dominican Republic	Captaincy General of Santo Domingo (1492–1795); Colony of Saint-Domingue (1795–1809); Captaincy General of Santo Domingo (1809–1821); Republic of Spanish Haiti (1821–1822); Occupied by Haiti (1822–1844); Dominican Republic (1844–1861); Occupied by Spain (1861–1865); Dominican Republic (1865–present)
El Salvador	Cuzcatlan (1200–1528) Part of the Real Audiencia of Guatemala (1543–1609) (part of New Spain); Part of the Captaincy General of Guatemala (1609–1821) (part of New Spain); Part of the Mexican Empire (1822–1823); Part of the Federal Republic of Central America (1823–1841); Republic of El Salvador (1841–present) (before 1890 referred to as Republic of Salvador in English)
Grenada	French Grenada (1649–1763); British Grenada (1763–1958) (part of British Windward Islands 1833–1958); Part of the West Indies Federation (1958–1962); British Grenada (1962–1974) (Associated State from 1967); Grenada (1974–present) (Commonwealth realm)
Guatemala	Part of the Real Audiencia of Guatemala (1543–1609); Part of the Captaincy General of Guatemala (1609–1821); Part of the Mexican Empire (1822–1823); Part of the Federal Republic of Central America (1823–1839); Republic of Guatemala (1839–present)
Haiti	Colony of Saint-Domingue (1625–1804); First Empire of Haiti (1804–1806); State of Haiti (1806–1811) (northern Haiti); Kingdom of Haiti (1811–1820); Republic of Haiti (1806–1849) (included northern Haiti since 1820; with Dominican Republic annexed 1822–1844); Second Empire of Haiti (1849–1859); Republic of Haiti (1859–present) (occupied by United States 1915–1934)
Honduras	Part of the Real Audiencia of Guatemala (1543–1609); Part of the Captaincy General of Guatemala (1609–1821); Part of the Mexican Empire (1822–1823); Part of the Federal Republic of Central America (1823–1838); Republic of Honduras (1838–present)
Jamaica	Colony of Jamaica (1655–1962); Jamaica (1962–present) (Commonwealth realm)
Mexico	Olmecs (1600–400 BC); Mixtec Civilization (1500 BC – 1523); Xochitecatl (800 BC – 950); Zapotec civilization (c. 700 BC – 1521); Teuchitlán Civilisation (350 BC – 450/500); Teotihuacan (200 BC – 750); Cholula city-state (2nd century BC – 1521); Veracruz civilisation (100–1000); Maya civilization (250–1697); Toltec Empire (650–1122); Colhuacan (717–1521); Xochimilco (c. 900 – 1521); Azcapotzalco (995–1428); Cocollán (1100–1521); Chalco (13th century – 1521); Purépecha Empire (1300–1520); Chiefdom of Ameca (1325–1522); Tlatelolco (1337–1473); Aztec Empire (1428–1521): Tetzcoco (1200–1521); Tenochtitlan (1325–1521); Tlacopan (1428–1521); Tlaxcala (1348–1520); Viceroyalty of New Spain (1521–1821); First Mexican Empire (1821–1823); Provisional Government of Mexico (1823–1824); First Mexican Republic (1824–1835); Centralist Republic of Mexico (1835–1846); Republic of Yucatán (1841–1848); Second Federal Republic of Mexico (1846–1863); Second Mexican Empire (1863–1867); United Mexican States (1867–present)
Nicaragua	Part of the Real Audiencia of Guatemala (1543–1609); Part of the Captaincy General of Guatemala (1609–1821); Part of the Mexican Empire (1822–1823); Part of the Federal Republic of Central America (1823–1838); Republic of Nicaragua (1838–present)
Saint Kitts and Nevis	Colony of Saint Christopher (1623–1882) and Colony of Nevis (1628–1882) (from 1833 part of British Leeward Islands); Colony of Saint Christopher-Nevis-Anguilla (1882–1958) (part of the British Leeward Islands; Anguilla separated from 1882 to 1951); Part of the West Indies Federation (1958–1962); Saint Christopher-Nevis-Anguilla (1962–1983) (Associated State from 1967; Anguilla separated since 1980); Federation of Saint Kitts and Nevis (1983–present) (officially the Federation of Saint Christopher and Nevis) (Commonwealth realm)
Saint Lucia	Colony of Sainte Lucie (1674–1814); Colony of Saint Lucia (1814–1958) (from 1838 part of the British Windward Islands); Part of the West Indies Federation (1958–1962); Colony of Saint Lucia (1962–1979) (Associated State from 1967); Saint Lucia (1979–present) (Commonwealth realm)
Saint Vincent and the Grenadines	Colony of Saint Vincent (1763–1958) (from 1838 part of the British Windward Islands); Part of the West Indies Federation (1958–1962); Colony of Saint Vincent (1962–1979) (Associated State since 1967); Saint Vincent and the Grenadines (1979–present) (Commonwealth realm)
United States	Hundreds of Native American tribes, bands, nations, and confederacies, some of which survive as domestic sovereign nations; Other European colonies acquired by British America: New Sweden (1638–1655); New Netherland (1614–1667, 1673–1674); Portions of New France (1534–1763); Thirteen colonies in British America declared independence to form the United States in 1776: Province of New Hampshire; Province of Massachusetts Bay; Colony of Rhode Island and Providence Plantations; Connecticut Colony; Province of New York; Province of New Jersey; Province of Pennsylvania; Delaware Colony; Province of Maryland; Colony of Virginia; Province of Carolina (1663–1712); Province of North Carolina (from 1712); Province of South Carolina (from 1712); Province of Georgia; Vermont Republic (1777–1791); Province of Louisiana (1762–1801, part of New Spain briefly retroceded to France and then acquired by the U.S. in the Louisiana Purchase); Republic of Indian Stream (1832–1835); Portions of Red River Colony and Rupert's Land ceded by Treaty of 1818; Portions of New Spain and Mexico; Spanish Florida (1513–1763, 1783–1821); East Florida (acquired 1821); West Florida (acquired 1821); Other territory ceded by the Adams–Onís Treaty (effective 1821); Republic of Texas (1836–1846); Mexican Cession ending the Mexican–American War (1848); Gadsden Purchase (1854); California Republic (1846); Russian Alaska (1741–1867); Hawaiian Kingdom (1795–1893), Republic of Hawaii (1894–1898); Territories; Portions of the Spanish Empire from the Spanish-American War (1898) and Treaty of Washington (1900): Portions of the Spanish East Indies; Guam; Philippines (later became independent); Puerto Rico; Cuba became independent except for a lease of Guantanamo Bay notionally under Cuban sovereignty; Eastern portion of the Kingdom of Samoa (acquired 1899); Danish West Indies (1672–1917); Portions of the Trust Territory of the Pacific Islands (1947–1994), formerly South Seas Mandate (1920–1945); Northern Mariana Islands; Federated States of Micronesia, Marshall Islands, and Palau became independent with Compact of Free Association; Portion of Panama (Panama Canal Zone), since returned; United States of America (1776–present)

== See also ==
- List of sovereign states and dependent territories in North America
- Succession of states
- Decolonization of the Americas
- Timeline of sovereign states in North America
