= Timeline of sovereign states in North America =

This timeline lists all sovereign states in North America (including Central America and the Caribbean), both current and defunct, from the year 1500 onwards.

== Timeline ==
Current Sovereign States / Decades		before	1500	1510	1520	1530	1540	1550	1560	1570	1580	1590	1600	1610	1620	1630		1640				1650		1660			1670			1680			1690	1700				1710	1720		1730		1740		1750		1760	1770	1780	1790	1800			1810		1820	1830	1840	1850	1860		1870	1880	1890	1900	1910	1920	1930		1940	1950	1960	1970	1980	1990	2000	2010
Antigua and Barbuda		Kalinago													1632 Antigua (England)											1671 British Leeward Islands (England)																									1816 Antigua-Barbuda-Montserrat (UK)		1833 British Leeward Islands (UK)															1958 West Indies Federation (UK)		1962 Antigua and Barbuda (UK)		1981 Antigua and Barbuda					
Antigua and Barbuda		Kalinago													Kalinago								1666 Barbuda (UK)			1671 British Leeward Islands (England)																									1816 Antigua-Barbuda-Montserrat (UK)		1833 British Leeward Islands (UK)															1958 West Indies Federation (UK)		1962 Antigua and Barbuda (UK)		1981 Antigua and Barbuda					
Bahamas		Lucayan people			1513 Deserted													1649 Eleutheran Adventurers							1670 Province of Carolina (England)													1718 Colony of the Bahamas (UK)																				1973 Bahamas																			
Barbados		Kalinago					Uninhabited								1625 Colony of Barbados (England)																														1958 West Indies Federation (UK)	1962 Barbados (UK)	1966 Barbados																														
Belize		Pre-Columbian Belize				1524 New Spain (Spain)																1742 Colony of Jamaica (UK)																										1862 British Honduras (UK)																1981 Belize													
Canada
Canada	Alberta	First Nations													1670 Rupert's Land (UK)																														1870 Northwest Territories ( Canada)				1905 Alberta ( Canada)																												
Canada	British Columbia	Indigenous peoples of the Pacific Northwest Coast													Indigenous peoples of the Pacific Northwest Coast			Colony of British Columbia 1858 (UK)	Colony of British Columbia 1866 (UK)		1871 British Columbia ( Canada)																																																								
Canada	British Columbia	Indigenous peoples of the Pacific Northwest Coast													Colony of Vancouver Island 1849 (UK)				Colony of British Columbia 1866 (UK)		1871 British Columbia ( Canada)																																																								
Canada	Manitoba	First Nations													1670 Rupert's Land (UK)																														1870 Manitoba (Canada)																																
Canada	New Brunswick	First Nations												1605 Acadia (France)																								1713 Nova Scotia (UK)											1784 New Brunswick (UK)												1867 New Brunswick (Canada)																
Canada	Newfoundland and Labrador	Beothuk												1610 Newfoundland Colony (UK)																												1907 Dominion of Newfoundland (UK)							1949 Newfoundland and Labrador (Canada)																												
Canada	Nova Scotia	Mi'kmaq												1605 Acadia (France)																								1713 Nova Scotia (UK)																				1867 Nova Scotia (Canada)																			
Canada	Ontario	Aboriginal Canadians					1534 Canada (France)																		1763 Province of Quebec (UK)								Upper Canada (UK)										Province of Canada (UK)					1867 Ontario (Canada)																													
Canada	Prince Edward Island	Mi’kmaq													1720 Isle Saint-Jean (France)											1763 Nova Scotia (UK)		1769 Prince Edward Island (UK)																					1873 Prince Edward Island (Canada)																												
Canada	Quebec	Aboriginal Canadians					1534 Canada (France)																		1763 Province of Quebec (UK)								1791 Lower Canada (UK)										1841 Province of Canada (UK)					1867 Quebec (Canada)																													
Canada	Saskatchewan	First Nations													1670 Rupert's Land (UK)																														1870 Northwest Territories (Canada)				1905 Saskatchewan (Canada)																												
Canada	Northwest Territories	Aboriginal Canadians													North-Western Territory (UK)			1870 Northwest Territories (Canada)																																																											
Canada	Nunavut	Inuit													1670 Rupert's Land (UK)																														1870 Northwest Territories (Canada)		1876 District of Keewatin (Canada)		1905 Northwest Territories (Canada)															1999 Nunavut (Canada)													
Canada	Yukon	Aboriginal Canadians													North-Western Territory (UK)			1870 Northwest Territories (Canada)								1898 Yukon (Canada)																																																			
Costa Rica		Indigenous peoples of Costa Rica					1540 New Spain (Spain)																			1821 First Mexican Empire	1823 Costa Rica ( Federal Republic of Central America)				1838 Costa Rica																																														
Cuba		Guanajatabey, Taíno and Ciboney		1511 Governorate of Cuba (Spain)	1519 New Spain (Spain)															1821 Captaincy General of Cuba (Spain)																			1898 US Military Government ( USA)	1902 Republic of Cuba																																					
Dominica		Kalinago													1727 Dominica (France)									1761 Dominica (UK)					1778 Dominica (France)	1783 Dominica (UK)											1833 British Leeward Islands (UK)																	1940 British Windward Islands (UK)		1958 West Indies Federation (UK)	1962 Dominica (UK)		1978 Dominica														
Dominican Republic		Captaincy General of Santo Domingo (Spain)													1795 Saint-Domingue (France)			1809 España Boba (Spain)				1821 Republic of Spanish Haiti	1822 Department of Ozama and Cibao (Haiti)					1844 Dominican Republic					1861 Spanish occupation of the Dominican Republic (Spain)	1865 Dominican Republic											1916 Dominican Republic ( USA)	1924 Dominican Republic																															
El Salvador		Cuzcatlan				1525 New Spain (Spain)																1821 First Mexican Empire	1823 El Salvador ( Federal Republic of Central America)				1841 El Salvador													1896 Greater Republic of Central America	1898 El Salvador																																				
Grenada		Kalinago													1649 French Antilles (France)																												1762 British Grenada (UK)			1779 Grenada (France)	1783 British Grenada (UK)							1833 British Windward Islands (UK)															1958 West Indies Federation (UK)	1962 Grenada (UK)		1974 Grenada					
Guatemala		Mayans			1521 New Spain (Spain)															1821 First Mexican Empire	1823 Guatemala ( Federal Republic of Central America)					1841 Guatemala																																																			
Haiti		Captaincy General of Santo Domingo (Spain)													1625 Saint-Domingue (France)																														1804 Haiti																																
Honduras		Pre-Columbian Honduras				1525 New Spain (Spain)																1821 Honduras (Mexico)	1823 Honduras ( Federal Republic of Central America)				1840 Honduras																																																		
Jamaica		Pre-Columbian Jamaica		1509 Colony of Santiago (Spain)														1655 Colony of Jamaica (England)																													1958 West Indies Federation (UK)	1962 Jamaica																													
Mexico		Aztec Empire			1521 New Spain (Spain)																1821 Mexico																																																								
Nicaragua		Pre-Columbian Nicaragua			1520 New Spain (Spain)																1821 Mexican Empire	1823 Nicaragua ( Federal Republic of Central America)				1838 Nicaragua																																																			
Panama		Indigenous peoples of the Americas		1510 Province of Tierra Firme (Spain)				1542 Viceroyalty of Peru (Spain)																			1717 Viceroyalty of New Granada (Spain)																					1821 Gran Colombia	1831 Republic of New Granada					1858 Granadine Confederation	1863 United States of Columbia			1886 Republic of Columbia		1903 Panama																	
Saint Kitts and Nevis		Arawaks and Kalinago													1623 Saint Christopher (England)												1671 British Leeward Islands (UK)																								1816 Saint Christopher-Nevis-Anguilla (UK)				1833 British Leeward Islands (UK)															1958 West Indies Federation (UK)	1962 Saint Christopher-Nevis-Anguilla (UK)		1983 Saint Kitts and Nevis				
Saint Kitts and Nevis		Arawaks and Kalinago													1628 Colony of Barbados (England)											1983 Nevis ( Saint Kitts and Nevis)	1671 British Leeward Islands (UK)																								1816 Saint Christopher-Nevis-Anguilla (UK)				1833 British Leeward Islands (UK)															1958 West Indies Federation (UK)	1962 Saint Christopher-Nevis-Anguilla (UK)						
Saint Lucia		Kalinago																																											1833 British Windward Islands (UK)																		1958 West Indies Federation (UK)	1962 Saint Lucia (UK)	1979 Saint Lucia												
Saint Vincent and the Grenadines		Kalinago													1719 Saint Vincent (France)												1763 Saint Vincent (UK)				1779 Saint Vincent (France)		1783 Saint Vincent (UK)										1833 British Windward Islands (UK)																		1958 West Indies Federation (UK)	1962 Saint Vincent and the Grenadines (UK)		1979 Saint Vincent and the Grenadines													
Trinidad and Tobago		Arawak and Kalinago													1797 Trinidad (UK)																							1889 British Trinidad and Tobago (UK)											1958 West Indies Federation (UK)		1962 Trinidad and Tobago																										
Trinidad and Tobago		Arawak and Kalinago													1628 Nieuw-Walcheren (Netherlands)		1637 Neu-Kurland (Poland-Lithuania)	Arawak and Kalinago				1654 Nieuw-Walcheren (Netherlands)						1677 Trinidad (France)										1889 British Trinidad and Tobago (UK)											1958 West Indies Federation (UK)		1962 Trinidad and Tobago								1797 Tobago (UK)																		
United States
United States	Alabama	Native Americans													Mississippi Territory 1798 ( USA)				Alabama Territory 1817 ( USA)	1819 Alabama ( USA)												1861 Alabama (CSA)	1865 Alabama ( USA)																																												
United States	Alaska	Alaskan Natives													1799 Russian America (Russia)																			1867 Department of Alaska ( USA)				1884 District of Alaska ( USA)					1912 Territory of Alaska ( USA)						1959 Alaska ( USA)																												
United States	Arizona	Native Americans													1768 The Californias (Spain)										1805 Alta California (Spain)					1822 Alta California Territory (Mexico)					1846 U.S. provisional government of New Mexico		1850 New Mexico Territory ( USA)		1863 Arizona Territory ( USA)									1912 Arizona ( USA)																													
United States	Arkansas	Native Americans													1682 Louisiana (France)																					1762 Louisiana (Spain)								1802 Louisiana (France)	1805 Louisiana Territory ( USA)	1812 Missouri Territory ( USA)	1819 Arkansas Territory ( USA)		1836 Arkansas ( USA)			1861 Arkansas (CSA)	1865 Arkansas ( USA)																								
United States	California (Note: See also Territorial evolution of California.)	Native Americans													1768 The Californias (Spain)										1805 Alta California (Spain)					1822 Alta California Territory (Mexico)					1846 United States military occupation ( USA)		1850 California ( USA)																																								
United States	Colorado	Native Americans													1836 Republic of Texas		1845 Texas ( USA)	1850 Unorganised territory ( USA) (Note: ’Unorganised territory’ was not an official name, rather it referred to any United States territory without an official name.)	1854 Kansas Territory (Note: Colorado at this point in time was split between the Kansas Territory, Utah Territory, Nebraska Territory and the New Mexico Territory, with the majority being within the Kansas Territory.) ( USA)			1861 Colorado Territory ( USA)				1876 Colorado ( USA)																																																			
United States	Connecticut	Native Americans													1636 Connecticut Colony (England)													1686 Dominion of New England (England)	1689 Connecticut Colony (England)																			1776 Connecticut ( USA)																													
United States	Delaware	Native Americans													1638 New Sweden (Sweden)				1655 New Netherland (Dutch Republic)			1664 Delaware Colony (UK)																									1776 Delaware (USA)																														
United States	Florida	Native Americans			1513 Spanish Florida (Spain)													1763 East Florida (UK)						1783 Spanish Florida (Spain)										1822 Florida Territory (USA)					1845 Florida (USA)			1861 Florida (CSA)	1865 Florida (USA)																																		
United States	Georgia	Native Americans													1732 Province of Georgia (UK)												1777 Georgia (USA)																		1861 Georgia (CSA)		1865 Georgia (USA)																														
United States	Idaho	Native Americans													1818 Oregon Country/Columbia District (USA/UK)							1843 Provisional Government of Oregon	1848 Oregon Territory (USA)	1853 Washington Territory (USA)										1890 Idaho (USA)																																											
United States	Illinois	Native Americans					1534 Canada (France)																		1763 Province of Quebec (UK)						1787 Northwest Territory (USA)			1800 Indiana Territory (USA)			1809 Illinois Territory (USA)	1818 Illinois (USA)																																							
United States	Indiana	Native Americans					1534 Canada (France)																		1763 Province of Quebec (UK)						1787 Northwest Territory (USA)			1800 Indiana Territory (USA)				1816 Indiana (USA)																																							
United States	Iowa	Native Americans					1534 Canada (France)																		1763 Province of Quebec (UK)						1787 Northwest Territory (USA)			1800 Indiana Territory (USA)	1805 Michigan Territory (USA)						1836 Wisconsin Territory (USA)	1838 Iowa Territory (USA)		1846 Iowa (USA)																																	
United States	Kansas	Native Americans													1803 Louisiana Purchase (USA)	1805 Louisiana Territory (USA)		1812 Missouri Territory (USA)	1821 Unorganized territory (USA)										1854 Kansas Territory (USA)	1861 Kansas (USA)																																															
United States	Kentucky	Virginia Indians												1607 Colony of Virginia (UK)																											Virginia 1776 (USA)				Kentucky 1792 (USA)																																
United States	Louisiana	Native Americans													1682 Louisiana (France)																					1762 Louisiana (Spain)								1803 Louisiana Purchase (USA)	1804 Territory of Orleans (USA)	1812 Louisiana (USA)																															
United States	Maine	Native Americans													Massachusetts Bay Colony 1652 (UK)									Dominion of New England 1686 (UK)	Massachusetts Bay Colony 1689 (UK)	Province of Massachusetts Bay 1692 (UK)																			1776 Massachusetts (USA)						1820 Maine (USA)																										
United States	Maryland	Native Americans													Province of Maryland 1632 (UK)																														Maryland 1776 (USA)																																
United States	Massachusetts	Native Americans													Massachusetts Bay Colony 1628 (UK)															Dominion of New England 1686 (UK)	Massachusetts Bay Colony 1689 (UK)		Province of Massachusetts Bay 1692 (UK)															Massachusetts 1776 (USA)																													
United States	Massachusetts	Native Americans													Plymouth Colony 1620 (UK)															Dominion of New England 1686 (UK)	Plymouth Colony 1689 (UK)		Province of Massachusetts Bay 1692 (UK)															Massachusetts 1776 (USA)																													
United States	Michigan	Native Americans					1534 Canada (France)																		1763 Province of Quebec (UK)						1787 Northwest Territory (USA)			1800 Indiana Territory (USA)	1805 Michigan Territory (USA)						1837 Michigan (USA)																																				
United States	Minnesota	Native Americans													1803 Louisiana Purchase (USA)	1805 Louisiana Territory (USA)		1812 Missouri Territory (USA)	1821 Unorganized territory (USA)				1834 Michigan Territory (USA)	1836 Wisconsin Territory (USA)	1838 Iowa Territory (USA)		1846 Unorganized territory (USA)	1849 Minnesota Territory (USA)		1858 Minnesota (USA)																																															
United States	Mississippi	Native Americans													1732 Province of Georgia (UK)												1777 Georgia (USA)						1798 Mississippi Territory (USA)					1817 Mississippi (USA)							1861 Mississippi (CSA)	1863| Mississippi (USA)																															
United States	Missouri	Native Americans													1803 Louisiana Purchase (USA)	1805 Louisiana Territory (USA)		1812 Missouri Territory (USA)	1821 Missouri (USA)																																																										
United States	Montana	Native Americans													1803 Louisiana Purchase (USA)	1805 Louisiana Territory (USA)		1812 Missouri Territory (USA)	1821 Unorganized territory (USA)										1854 Nebraska Territory (USA)	1861 Dakota Territory (USA)	1863 Idaho Territory (USA)	1864 Territory of Montana (USA)						1889 Montana (USA)																																							
United States	Nebraska	Native Americans													1682 Louisiana (France)																					1762 Louisiana (Spain)								1802 Louisiana (France)	1805 Louisiana Territory (USA)	1812 Missouri Territory (USA)	1821 Unorganized territory (USA)				1854 Nebraska Territory (USA)						1867 Nebraska (USA)																				
United States	Nevada	Native Americans													1768 New Spain (Spain)														1821 Alta California (Mexico)							1848 Mexican Cession (USA)	1850 Utah Territory (USA)	1861 Nevada Territory (USA)	1864 Nevada (USA)																																						
United States	New Hampshire	Native Americans													1622 Province of Maine (UK)	Province of New Hampshire (UK)		1641 Massachusetts Bay Colony (UK)												1680 Province of New Hampshire (UK)	1686 Dominion of New England (UK)	1689 Province of New Hampshire (UK)																1776 New Hampshire (USA)																													
United States	New Jersey	Native Americans													1630 New Netherland (Dutch Republic)							1655 New Netherland (Dutch Republic)	1664 Province of New Jersey (UK)			1674 East Jersey (UK)								1702 Province of New Jersey (UK)														1776 New Jersey (USA)																													
United States	New Jersey	Native Americans													Native Americans		1638 New Sweden (Sweden)					1655 New Netherland (Dutch Republic)	1664 Province of New Jersey (UK)			1674 West Jersey (UK)								1702 Province of New Jersey (UK)														1776 New Jersey (USA)																													
United States	New Mexico	Native Americans											1598 Santa Fe de Nuevo México (Spanish Empire and New Spain)																											1821 Santa Fe de Nuevo México (Mexico)					1846 U.S. provisional government of New Mexico (USA)	1850 New Mexico Territory (USA)									1912 New Mexico (USA)																						
United States	New York	Native Americans													1614 New Netherland (Dutch Republic)											1667 Province of New York (UK)	1673 New Netherland (Dutch Republic)	1674 Province of New York (UK)																				1776 New York (USA)																													
United States	North Carolina	Native Americans									1585 Roanoke Colony (UK)		Native Americans		1609 Colony of Virginia (UK)		1629 Province of Carolina (UK)																					1710 Province of North Carolina (UK)											1776 North Carolina (USA)												1861 North Carolina (CSA)	1865 North Carolina (USA)															
United States	North Dakota	Native Americans													1833 Michigan Territory (USA)	1836 Wisconsin Territory (USA)	1838 Iowa Territory (USA)	1846 Unorganized territory (USA)	1849 Minnesota Territory (USA)			1858 Unorganized territory (USA)	1861 Dakota Territory (USA)							1889 North Dakota (USA)																																															
United States	Ohio	Native Americans					1534 Canada (France)																		1763 Province of Quebec (UK)					1783 Northwest Territory (USA)					1803 Ohio (USA)																																										
United States	Oklahoma	Native Americans													1682 Louisiana (France)																					1762 Louisiana (Spain)								1803 Louisiana Purchase (USA)	1804 Louisiana Territory (USA)	1812 Missouri Territory (USA)	1819 Arkansas Territory (USA)	1824 Unorganized territory (USA)	1834 Indian Territory (USA)									1890 Indian Territory (USA)	1907 Oklahoma (USA)																		
United States	Oklahoma	Native Americans													1682 Louisiana (France)																					1762 Louisiana (Spain)								1803 Louisiana Purchase (USA)	1804 Louisiana Territory (USA)	1812 Missouri Territory (USA)	1819 Arkansas Territory (USA)	1824 Unorganized territory (USA)	1834 Indian Territory (USA)									1890 Oklahoma Territory (USA)	1907 Oklahoma (USA)																		
United States	Oregon	Native Americans													1818 Oregon Country/Columbia District (USA/UK)							1843 Provisional Government of Oregon (USA)	1848 Oregon Territory (USA)			1859 Oregon (USA)																																																			
United States	Pennsylvania	Native Americans													1681 Province of Pennsylvania (England)																								1776 Pennsylvania (USA)																																						
United States	Rhode Island	Native Americans													1636 Colony of Rhode Island and Providence Plantations (UK)																														1776 Rhode Island (USA)																																
United States	South Carolina	Native Americans													1629 Province of Carolina (UK)																							1712 Province of South Carolina (UK)										1776 South Carolina (USA)												1861 South Carolina (CSA)	1865 South Carolina (USA)																
United States	South Dakota	Native Americans													1803 Louisiana Purchase (USA)	1805 Louisiana Territory (USA)		1812 Missouri Territory (USA)	1821 Unorganised Territory (USA)				1834 Michigan Territory (USA)	1836 Wisconsin Territory (USA)	1838 Iowa Territory (USA)		1846 Unorganised Territory (USA)	1849 Minnesota Territory (USA)		1858 Unorganized territory (USA)	1861 Dakota Territory (USA)							1889 South Dakota (USA)																																							
United States	Tennessee	Native Americans												1609 Colony of Virginia (UK)		1629 Province of Carolina (UK)																						1710 Province of North Carolina (UK)										1776 North Carolina (USA)		1790 Southwest Territory (USA)	1796 Tennessee (USA)									1861 Tennessee (CSA)	1862 Tennessee (USA)																
United States	Texas	Native Americans													1684 French Texas (France)		1690 Spanish Texas (Spain)																														1821 Mexican Texas (Mexico)	1836 Republic of Texas	1845 Texas (USA)		1861 Texas (CSA)	1865 Texas (USA)																									
United States	Utah	Native Americans													1768 The Californias (Spain)										1805 Alta California (Spain)					1822 Alta California Territory (Mexico)					1846 Unorganized territory (USA)	1849 State of Deseret	1850 Utah Territory (USA)								1896 Utah (USA)																																
United States	Vermont	Native Americans					1534 Canada (France)																		1763 Province of New York ( British Empire)			1777 Vermont Republic					1791 Vermont (USA)																																												
United States	Virginia	Virginia Indians												1607 Colony of Virginia (UK)																											1776 Virginia (USA)														1861 Virginia ( CSA)		1865 Virginia (USA)																				
United States	Washington	Native Americans													1818 Oregon Country/Columbia District (USA/British Empire)							1843 Provisional Government of Oregon	1848 Oregon Territory (USA)	1853 Washington Territory (USA)										1889 Washington (USA)																																											
United States	West Virginia	Virginia Indians												1607 Colony of Virginia (UK)																											1776 Virginia (USA)															1863 West Virginia (USA)																					
United States	Wisconsin	Native Americans					1534 Canada (France)																		1763 Province of Quebec (UK)						1787 Northwest Territory (USA)			1800 Indiana Territory (USA)			1809 Illinois Territory (USA)	1818 Michigan Territory (USA)			1836 Wisconsin Territory (USA)				1848 Wisconsin (USA)																																
United States	Wyoming	Native Americans													1682 Louisiana (France)																					1762 Louisiana (Spain)							1800 Louisiana (France)	1803 Louisiana Purchase (USA)	1805 Louisiana Territory (USA)	1812 Missouri Territory (USA)	1821 Unorganized territory (USA)				1854 Nebraska Territory (USA)	1863 Idaho Territory (USA)	1864 Dakota Territory (USA)	1868 Territory of Wyoming (USA)				1890 Wyoming (USA)																			
United States	District of Columbia	Native Americans													1632 Province of Maryland (UK)																														1776 Maryland (USA)			1790 District of Columbia (USA)																													
United States	Puerto Rico	New Spain													1898 Puerto Rico (USA)																																																														
United States	United States Virgin Islands														Danish West India Company 1671 (Denmark)																								Danish West Indies 1755 (Denmark)																				United States Virgin Islands 1917 (USA)																		
Current Sovereign States / Decades		before	1500	1510	1520	1530	1540	1550	1560	1570	1580	1590	1600	1610	1620	1630		1640				1650		1660			1670			1680			1690	1700				1710	1720		1730		1740		1750		1760	1770	1780	1790	1800			1810		1820	1830	1840	1850	1860		1870	1880	1890	1900	1910	1920	1930		1940	1950	1960	1970	1980	1990	2000	2010

== See also ==
- List of predecessors of sovereign states in North America
- Timeline of sovereign states in South America
