= International legal personality =

Concept in international law

International legal personality (international juridical personality) is an important facet of international law that has developed throughout history as a means of international representation and capacity to contract and institute International legal proceedings. With the acquirement of personality comes privileges and International rights and responsibilities. International Legal Personality is inherent capacity of states and it is provided by basic legal acts (Statutes or "Constitutions") or International Conventions to international organizations.

International governmental organizations (or IGOs) are associations of states established by an international treaty or convention to pursue the common aims of their member states. Also referred to as Intergovernmental Organizations, IGOs have "a legal personality separate from its member states, and can enter into legally binding agreements with other IGOs or with other states." Examples of IGOs include the United Nations (UN), the Organization of American States (OAS), and the North Atlantic Treaty Alliance (NATO).

== International law ==
Rules made by states for states is the basis of international law. International law governs states and their relationships with one another. Historically it was believed that states were the only actors in international law and therefore other entities were merely the responsibility of international law.

Gaining international legal personality is often a goal of international actors. By gaining personality, they gain acknowledgment in the international legal community. The amount of personality that an international actor has depends entirely upon state recognition. Legal personality can determine the rights that actors have as well as their standings with courts. As personality is given by states, it stands to reason that international actors are only effective when states allow them to be. Without the approval of states, other actors have no rights nor any true ability in the international arena. One question that critics of the effectiveness of legal personality ask is if “personality contain[s] any inherent legal capacity to act?” Personality is a concept with many blurred areas but must be grasped to understand the effectiveness, or ineffectiveness, of international actors. Entities that are capable of being granted personality and thus being subjects of international law are those with the capacity to act within the international arena. Entities that are candidates for international legal personality include corporations, companies, sovereign states, international organizations, and individuals. These entities should have legal powers, the ability to effectively exercise their powers, and associations with states on a permanent basis.

== History ==
Until the expansion of non-governmental organizations (or NGOs) in the 20th century, legal personality was not given to non-state actors commonly, if ever. Once these entities became actors, they were not ordinarily given personality unless granted by the state in a legal statute or treaty. Typically international organizations, NGOs, and corporations were seen as groups of individuals and were viewed as recipients of international law, rather than actors on the international stage. However NGOs especially have increasingly begun to play important roles in international politics and policy-making over the last several decades. It is not clear when NGOs truly began to play a role in international politics, but the first notice of groups influencing the international policy-making occurred in 1826. In 1911, these groups began to grow and amass attention and in 1919 Dwight W. Morrow began using “NGO” as a term. By 1943 scholars of several disciplines were referring to these groups of influence as NGOs. After formal recognition by the UN, NGOs were able to truly interact in the international arena. Getting international personality has historically been an obstacle for NGOs. 1910 saw the first convention to grant legal personality, and in 1936 Charles Fenwick is quoted with saying that NGO representation “might be greatly effective in cutting across national lines.” In response to changes in world policies, the approaches taken to obtain and grant international legal personality have seen several changes. These changes have resulted in and will continue to result in variations and challenges to the sources of international legal personality and the roles that other international actors play. States were the first to gain international legal personality, followed by non-state actors (such as MNCs and NGOs) and individuals. The 1986 Vienna Convention on the Law of Treaties between States and International Organizations established the definition of an international organization. The definition excluded non-governmental organizations and established the concept of legal personality.

== Personality: privileges and rights ==
Rights that come with obtaining international legal personality include the right to enter into treaties, right to immunity, right to send and receive legations, and the right to bring international claims to obtain reparation for damages. Those who have international legal personality can sue and be sued, can enter into contracts, can incur debt, and pay various taxes.

=== Non-governmental organizations ===
Non-governmental organizations with personality are able to participate directly with international bodies and organizations created by legislation and treaties. They are given the ability to fund a cause rather than ask for funding for a cause. They are even given certain legal rights and protections. NGOs that are parties of a treaty can file for wrongdoings. NGOs with personality can eventually gain representative status on international councils and assemblies. Some NGOs, such as the International Red Cross and Red Crescent Societies have been given rights that governments usually give to international organizations (or IOs). NGOs are not held back by things such as political parties and reelections, they are simply allowed to lobby for what they think is the best choice. This freedom is typically found only in NGOs. This freedom gives NGOs a type of flexibility and efficiency that, once again, other international actors don't possess. More energy is bound to arise from an NGO rather than an IGO, as NGOs are voluntary commitments. The people within an NGO are dedicated to their cause and are more likely to work harder to get things done. NGOs are also able to act beyond the realm of sovereignty in a way that governments and their organizations cannot do. Once an NGO reaches consultative status, they are able to do even more. Consultative NGOs are able to receive official documents, attend meetings of various councils, be consulted by a Secretary-General or committee, and participate in hearings in various ways.

== Obtaining international legal personality ==
There are theories to consider when deciding how international legal personality should be applied and from where the power comes.

=== Legal Traditionalist approach ===
The Legal Traditionalist Approach is one such method. In this way of thinking, one would believe that international legal personality must be explicitly transmitted from states to actors via some legal instrument. Without this transfer, an actor has no standing. In this approach, states are viewed as the ultimate international actors and the only source for personality.

=== Factual Realist approach ===
Directly opposite of this approach is the Factual Realist Approach. This method of thinking outlines global integration as the source of international legal personality rather than states. Factual realists would assume that states will eventually cease to be the source of personality for NGOs as globalization and transculturation occur.

=== Dynamic State approach ===
The Dynamic State Approach falls rather nicely between the two latter approaches. Basically a halfway point between Factual Realism and Legal Traditionalism, this approach finds the source of personality for actors lies within international treaties or customs. Dynamic State Approach theorists would claim that while legal traditionalists lean too much towards preserving international law through tradition, factual realists tend to disregard the customs and traditions of international law.

== United Kingdom v. Costa Rica (1923) ==
=== Facts ===
The former government of Costa Rica, known as the Ticono Regime, was said to have given oil concession to a British company. The new government of Costa Rica needed to acknowledge the action. The United Kingdom disagreed, as it had already been granted.

=== Questions ===
- "Does a government need to conform to a previous constitution if the government had established itself and maintained a peaceful de facto administration?"
- "Does non-recognition of a government by other governments destroy the de facto status of the government?"

=== Ruling ===
There is no need to conform to a previous constitution in such an instance. Non-recognition of the government by other governments delegitimizes the status of the government.
