= List of African countries by area =

Area ranking of African countries

Orthographic projection of Earth, with Africa highlighted: Africa Other continents

Below is a list of countries in Africa by area.

Africa is the second-largest continent in the world by area and population. Algeria has been the largest country in Africa and the Arab world since the division of the Sudan in 2011. The largest African country in sub-Saharan Africa is the Democratic Republic of the Congo. Located in Central Africa, DR Congo is also the second-largest country on the continent. Also located in Central Africa, Chad is the continent's largest landlocked country. Madagascar is the largest island country in Africa; it is also the second-largest island country in the world, only behind Indonesia.

Seychelles is the smallest country in Africa overall, with The Gambia being the smallest country on mainland Africa. The continent's smallest landlocked country is Eswatini. Tunisia is the smallest country in Northern Africa.

The list does not include the territory of Western Sahara, whose political status is still in dispute between Morocco and the Polisario Front.

== List ==
	Country	% total	Africa area in km^{2} (mi^{2})	Notes
1	Algeria	7.9%	2,381,741 (919,595)	(Note: Largest country in the Arab world and tenth-largest country in the whole world.)
2	Democratic Republic of Congo	7.7%	2,344,858 (905,355)	
3	Sudan	6.1%	1,857,392 (717,143)	(Note: With a former area of 2,505,813 km^{2} (967,500 sq mi), Sudan was the largest country in Africa until South Sudan split from North Sudan in 2011.)
4	Libya	5.8%	1,760,540 (679,750)	
5	Chad	4.2%	1,284,846 (496,082)	(Note: Largest landlocked country in Africa.)
6	Niger	4.2%	1,268,642 (489,825)	
7	Angola	4.1%	1,246,700 (481,400)	(Note: Including the exclave of Cabinda. Largest country in Africa completely in the Southern Hemisphere, and fourth-largest country in the world completely in the Southern Hemisphere.)
8	Mali	4.1%	1,240,192 (478,841)	
9	South Africa	4.0%	1,221,037 (471,445)	(Note: Including the Prince Edward Islands. Second-largest country in Africa completely in the Southern Hemisphere, and the fifth-largest country in the world completely in the Southern Hemisphere.)
10	Ethiopia	3.6%	1,104,300 (426,400)	
11	Mauritania	3.4%	1,030,700 (398,000)	
12	Egypt	3.3%	1,002,450 (387,050)	(Note: 1,010,408 km^{2} (390,121 sq mi) when including the Sinai region, geographically a part of West Asia.)
13	Tanzania	3.1%	946,088 (365,287)	
14	Nigeria	3.1%	924,768 (357,055)	
15	Namibia	2.7%	826,616 (319,158)	
16	Mozambique	2.6%	800,590 (309,110)	
17	Zambia	2.5%	752,612 (290,585)	
18	South Sudan	2.1%	648,421 (250,357)	
19	Somalia	2.1%	637,657 (246,201)	(Note: Including Somaliland.)
20	Central African Republic	2.1%	622,984 (240,535)	
21	Madagascar	1.9%	588,042 (227,044)	(Note: Excluding the disputed islands of Bassas da India, Europa Island, the Glorioso Islands, and Juan de Nova Island, currently administered by France. Largest island country in Africa.)
22	Botswana	1.9%	581,730 (224,610)	
23	Kenya	1.9%	580,367 (224,081)	
24	Cameroon	1.6%	476,442 (183,955)	
25	Morocco	1.5%	446,550 (172,410)	(Note: Not including Western Sahara)
26	Zimbabwe	1.3%	390,756 (150,872)	
27	Republic of Congo	1.1%	342,660 (132,300)	
28	Ivory Coast	1.1%	322,460 (124,500)	
29	Burkina Faso	0.9%	274,224 (105,878)	
30	Gabon	0.9%	268,668 (103,733)	
31	Guinea	0.8%	246,858 (95,312)	
32	Uganda	0.8%	242,550 (93,650)	
33	Ghana	0.8%	238,534 (92,098)	
34	Senegal	0.7%	196,722 (75,955)	
35	Tunisia	0.5%	164,610 (63,560)	
36	Malawi	0.4%	118,484 (45,747)	
37	Eritrea	0.4%	116,600 (45,000)	
38	Benin	0.4%	114,762 (44,310)	
39	Liberia	0.4%	112,370 (43,390)	
40	Sierra Leone	0.2%	72,740 (28,090)	
41	Togo	0.2%	56,785 (21,925)	
42	Guinea Bissau	0.1%	36,126 (13,948)	
43	Lesotho	0.1%	30,356 (11,721)	
44	Equatorial Guinea	0.1%	28,052 (10,831)	(Note: Including the offshore islands of Annobón, Corisco, Elobey Grande, and Elobey Chico.)
45	Burundi	0.1%	26,834 (10,361)	
46	Rwanda	0.09%	26,338 (10,169)	
47	Djibouti	0.08%	24,200 (9,300)	
48	Eswatini	0.06%	18,364 (7,090)	(Note: Smallest landlocked country in Africa.)
49	Gambia	0.04%	12,296 (4,748)	(Note: Smallest country on the African mainland.)
50	Cape Verde	0.01%	4,034 (1,558)	
51	Mauritius	0.01%	2,240 (860)	(Note: Includes Agaléga, and Saint Brandon, which add 70 km^{2} (27 sq mi) and 190 km^{2} (73 sq mi), respectively.)
52	Comoros	0.01%	2,236 (863)	(Note: 2,052 km^{2} (792 sq mi) including the disputed islands of the Glorioso Islands and Mayotte, currently administered by France.)
53	Sao Tome and Principe	0.003%	1,000 (390)	
54	Seychelles	0.001%	452 (175)	
	Total	100%	30,265,522 km^{2} (11,685,583 sq mi)	

== See also ==
- List of African countries by population
- List of countries and dependencies by area
