= List of African countries by GDP =

List of African countries by GDP may refer to:

- List of African countries by GDP (nominal)
- List of African countries by GDP (PPP)
