= List of African countries by population =

Africa population by country
1. Nigeria (15.4%)
2. Ethiopia (8.70%)
3. Egypt (7.70%)
4. DR Congo (7.10%)
5. Tanzania (4.50%)
6. South Africa (4.30%)
7. Kenya (3.70%)
8. Others (48.6%)

This is a list of the current 54 African countries sorted by population, also sorted by normalized demographic projections from the most recently available census or demographic data. Africa is the fastest growing continent in the world, currently increasing by 2.35% per year as of 2021. Africa is also the continent with the youngest population, as 60% of Africans are 24 years of age or younger. This list also includes the French department Réunion, and the partially recognized country Sahrawi Arab Democratic Republic, commonly known as Western Sahara, which is a member of the African Union.

== Table ==
	Country or territory	% Africa	Population	% growth	Official figure	Official date	Notes
1	Nigeria	15.4%	227,882,945	2.12%	216,783,400	21 Mar 2022	
2	Ethiopia	8.7%	128,691,692	2.64%	107,334,000	1 Jul 2023	
3	Egypt	7.7%	114,535,772	1.70%	102,060,688	1 Jul 2021	(Note: Figures include the Sinai region, which is geographically a part of West Asia.)
4	DR Congo	7.1%	105,789,731	3.31%	95,370,000	1 Jul 2019	
5	Tanzania	4.5%	66,617,606	2.95%	61,741,120	23 Aug 2022	
6	South Africa	4.3%	63,212,384	1.34%	59,604,992	1 Jul 2022	
7	Kenya	3.7%	55,339,003	2.00%	51,526,000	1 Jan 2023	
8	Sudan	3.4%	50,042,791	1.34%	41,984,500	1 Jul 2018	
9	Uganda	3.3%	48,656,601	2.84%	45,905,417	1 May 2024	
10	Algeria	3.1%	46,164,219	1.51%	46,300,000	1 Jan 2023	
11	Morocco	2.5%	37,712,505	1.03%	36,828,330	1 Sep 2024	
12	Angola	2.5%	36,749,906	3.13%	38,778,554	1 Jan 2026	
13	Ghana	2.3%	33,787,914	1.93%	34,378,768	1 Jan 2026	
14	Mozambique	2.3%	33,635,160	3.00%	33,244,414	1 Mar 2024	
15	Madagascar	2.1%	31,195,932	2.49%	27,190,927	1 Jun 2020	
16	Ivory Coast	2.1%	31,165,654	2.54%	29,389,150	14 Dec 2021	
17	Cameroon	1.9%	28,372,687	2.68%	24,348,251	Jul 1 2019	
18	Niger	1.9%	26,159,867	3.35%	23,196,000	1 Jul 2020	
19	Mali	1.8%	23,769,127	3.02%	14,528,662	4 May 2024	
20	Burkina Faso	1.6%	23,025,776	2.30%	20,505,155	16 Nov 2019	
21	Malawi	1.4%	21,104,482	2.60%	19,809,511	3 Sep 2023	
22	Zambia	1.4%	20,723,965	2.83%	19,610,769	14 Sep 2022	
23	Chad	1.3%	19,319,064	4.68%	15,775,400	1 Jul 2019	
24	Somalia	1.2%	18,358,615	3.13%	12,316,895	4 May 2024	(Note: Includes Somaliland, which has a population of about 6.2 million.)
25	Senegal	1.2%	18,077,573	2.42%	18,275,743	1 Jul 2023	
26	Zimbabwe	1.1%	16,340,822	1.69%	15,178,979	20 Apr 2022	
27	Guinea	1.0%	14,405,465	2.49%	13,261,638	Jul 1 2022	
28	Benin	1.0%	14,111,034	2.55%	12,606,998	1 Jul 2023	
29	Rwanda	1.0%	13,954,471	2.22%	13,246,394	15 Aug 2022	
30	Burundi	0.9%	13,689,450	2.77%	13,097,400	1 Jul 2023	
31	Tunisia	0.9%	12,200,431	0.68%	11,803,588	1 Jan 2022	
32	South Sudan	0.8%	11,483,374	4.19%	13,249,924	1 Jul 2020	
33	Togo	0.6%	9,304,337	2.36%	8,095,498	8 Nov 2022	
34	Sierra Leone	0.6%	8,460,512	2.22%	7,541,641	9 Dec 2021	
35	Libya	0.5%	7,305,659	1.13%	6,931,061	1 Jan 2020	
36	Congo	0.4%	6,182,885	2.45%	3,697,490	4 May 2024	
37	Liberia	0.4%	5,493,031	2.23%	4,844,381	1 Jul 2023	
38	Central African Republic	0.4%	5,152,421	1.07%	6,091,097	1 Mar 2021	
39	Mauritania	0.3%	5,022,441	3.01%	4,352,037	1 Jul 2022	
40	Eritrea	0.3%	3,470,390	1.79%	3,815,900	1 Jul 2012	
41	Namibia	0.2%	2,963,095	2.54%	2,641,857	1 Jul 2023	
42	Gambia	0.2%	2,697,845	2.33%	2,417,471	1 Jul 2022	
43	Gabon	0.2%	2,484,789	2.22%	2,349,099	1 Jul 2023	
44	Botswana	0.2%	2,480,244	1.65%	2,346,179	18 Mar 2022	
45	Lesotho	0.2%	2,311,472	1.11%	2,103,600	1 Jul 2023	
46	Guinea-Bissau	0.1%	2,153,339	2.27%	1,781,308	1 Jul 2023	
47	Equatorial Guinea	0.1%	1,847,549	2.44%	1,558,160	1 Jul 2022	
48	Mauritius	0.1%	1,273,588	-0.20%	1,261,196	31 Dec 2022	
49	Eswatini	0.1%	1,230,506	0.95%	1,223,362	1 Jul 2023	
50	Djibouti	0.1%	1,152,944	1.39%	1,001,454	1 Jul 2021	
—	Réunion (France)	0.1%	896,175		896,175	10 Jan 2024	
51	Comoros	0.1%	850,387	1.94%	758,316	15 Dec 2017	
—	Western Sahara (disputed)	0.04%	579,729	1.93%	579,000	1 Jul 2020	
52	Cape Verde	0.04%	522,331	0.50%	483,628	16 Jun 2021	
53	São Tomé and Príncipe	0.02%	230,871	2.02%	210,200	13 May 2020	
54	Seychelles	0.01%	127,951	1.94%	100,447	22 Apr 2022	
	Total	100%	1,480,770,525	2.34%	1,332,291,870		

== See also ==
- Demographics of Africa
- List of African countries by area
- List of African countries by life expectancy
