= Bailundo (kingdom) =

Non-sovereign kingdom in Angola

Kingdom of Bailundo Reino Bailundo (Portuguese) Vusoma wa Mbalundu (Umbundu)
- The "Kingdom of Bailundo", c. 1760
- Status: Sovereign kingdom (c. 1700–1770); Vassal of the Portuguese Empire (1770–1904); Currently a non-sovereign monarchy within Angola
- Capital: Bailundo
- Common languages: Umbundu; Portuguese
- Demonym: Va-Mbailundu
- Government: Monarchy
- Soma inene
  - 18th century: Katyavala I
  - 2021-present: Tchongolola Tchongonga
- History
  - Conquest of Halavala: c. 1700
  - Bailundo revolt: 1904 (end of sovereign monarchy)
- Today part of: Angola

The Kingdom of Bailundo, also known as Bailundu, Mbailundu or Mbalundu, is an Angolan Ovimbundu kingdom based in the modern-day province of Huambo, in the central highlands of Angola. It was one of the largest and most powerful Ovimbundu kingdoms. Some news reports state the kingdom was founded in the 15th century, however oral histories and archival evidence suggest it emerged as a political entity around 1700. The kingdom was initially called Halavala.

== Characteristics ==
The kingdom has passed through various stages in its history, both as an independent kingdom and as a vassal state of the Portuguese empire. Today, it is a non-sovereign monarchy within the Republic of Angola, and its rulers are considered community leaders and hold significant influence over local matters.

The current territory of the kingdom contains the municipality of Bailundo, as well as some areas of neighbouring municipalities such as Mungo, Lounduimbale and Tchicalala. The monarchy's officially recognised role in these extended areas is ambiguous and complex; for example King Ekuikui IV, for certain issues, dealt with four different municipal administrations. In the Bailundo municipality, the king is an integral part of the local municipal council. Kings are tasked with issuing judgments in a traditional court system, often relating to issues such as land disputes, sexual abuse, theft, and witchcraft.

The king has an official residence known as Ombala yo Mbalundu (considered to be a cultural heritage site), which contains a palace, 35 residences for sobas (nobles), a school, three laboratories, and a medical centre. The bones of previous kings of Bailundu are also kept here in a cemetery called Akokotos (the skulls are kept separately).

== Succession ==
Succession rules within the kingdom have undergone changes over time. Legitimacy is derived from having "blue blood", or descent from past kings. In some instances, succession was hereditary, with the crown passing to the king's son. Chingui II for example, was the son of Chingui I. In other cases, succession has been passed to the grandsons of a previous king, with Ekuikui V being a grandson of Ekuikui IV, for example. In 2021, Tchongolola Tchongonga was elected as king by a council of elders and rulers within the kingdom. Tchongolola Tchongonga is also a grandson of Ekuikui IV.

Ekuikui V, king of Bailundo from 2012 to 2021, explained that the king can only be succeeded by a matrilineal nephew of a previous king, or alternatively, a grandson of a previous king.

Throughout the 1900s, succession in the kingdom was subject to interference by outsiders, such as Portuguese authorities or Angolan government officials. In 1982, for example, Benjamin Pesela Tchongolola was appointed king by the local commissioner despite having no royal lineage. During the period of Angolan Civil War, the rebel group UNITA also interfered with the choosing of the kingdom's ruler.

== History ==
=== Early history ===
The kingdom was founded by King Katyavala I, who originally came from Kwanza-sul. According to Ekuikui IV, Katyavala migrated to the area following a dispute. Oral histories state that it was his possession of a rifle, at the time a unique technological advantage among the local population, that allowed him to assert himself as ruler of Halavala and surrounding villages, Tchilapa, Ngola, Ndulu and Viyé.

The second king of Bailundu, Jahulo I, was known for his wars against neighbouring areas such as Cilemo and Sambo. His war with Sambo was driven by the desire for more cattle, relocation of populations, and conquest. He also engaged with the local population of Portuguese and Luso-Africans traders who lived in the principal towns of the highlands. He was said to have taken many "white people" and many "women". Further expansion occurred under succeeding kings, especially north towards Kwanza, where attacks against the provinces of Sumbe, Haku, and Tambo were made. All of these territories were, at the time, Portuguese vassals. These conquests, along with further expansion westwards, seriously threatened the Portuguese. António de Lencastre amassed one of the largest forces the Portuguese had ever put together to invade Bailundo and put an end to these acts of aggression in the Mbailundu War (1773–1776). Ultimately, the war was successful and Chingui, king at the time, was captured and was held in confinement for the rest of his life.

=== Portuguese era ===
In 1778, the Portuguese attempted to install Kapangano as ruler. Kapangano, however, was overthrown and Ekuikui I, succeeded him 1780. The Mbailundu War had restricted the power of the kingdom, and established the kingdom as a Portuguese vassal state. Increasingly, Portuguese merchants became more common in Bailundu and neighbouring lands, and Portugal put in place a local governor to rule with the king (albeit, with limited powers to do so). Ekuikui I and successive monarchs frequently engaged in wars with their neighbours, partially under the guise of protecting Portuguese interests, while extending their own power and capturing peoples to increase the population of the kingdom. Oral traditions suggest captured peoples became slaves of the king, some were sold to merchants while others would eventually be allowed to settle in his lands and become his subjects. In 1785, a Portuguese report noted Bailundu had amassed around 3,800 guns, far more than any other Ovimbundu kingdom. In 1799, the Portuguese estimated that Bailundo was made up of around 82 Chiefdoms and "dominated" 2,056 villages. The relationship between the Bailundu and Portugal was turbulent, and revolts were common until at least the 1830s.

The height of the kingdom was during the reign of Ekuikui II, from 1876 to 1890. Ekuikui's full regnal name was Ekuikui Cikundiakundia Cipuka Kaliwa la Njila, which translates to "The Larva Cikundiakundia that Cannot Be Eaten by the Bird" (meaning, "I escaped; I shall not be defeated by anything"). During the peak of his power, surrounding polities in Esele, Viye, and Bukusu were subservient to Bailundo. In 1881, the American Protestant organisation ABCFM, upon invitation from Ekuikui II, established its first mission station in Bailundo. Missionaries from this group aided, at least in part, in preserving the history of the kingdom and the culture of the surrounding area and people groups. They published manuscripts such as "The Customs of the Ombala (Capital) of Bailundo", which detailed the history of the kingdom and culture, as well as "Umbundu: folk tales" and other such works.

Ekuikui II is remembered through oral traditions to have been an adept diplomat, who successfully kept Portuguese encroachment in check. Ekuikui II re-established Bailundu's power in the region and, for the most part, the Portuguese largely accepted the kingdom's independence during his reign – as long as trade was not interrupted. This was despite the fact that Ekuikui repeatedly requested that Portugal station a local Capitão-mor (Portuguese administrator) in his kingdom to elevate his status over his neighbours. The kingdom faced no major wars during the rule of Ekuikui II, and reached a period of unprecedented economic prosperity – primarily from profits due to the rubber trade.

Ekuikui II was succeeded by Numa II. While Ekuikui II largely enjoyed independence from the Portuguese, this would no longer be the case under the reign of Numa II. Portugal re-established their control over the kingdom in the 1890s, and Numa II was killed by Portuguese Captain Justino Teixeira da Silva. In 1902, a mass revolt was led by the kingdom against Portuguese authorities, leading to its complete incorporation into Portuguese Angola in 1904. The failure of the revolt led to a loss of political and economic autonomy and sharp reduction in physical territory, transforming the kingdom into a non-sovereign monarchy.

Future kings of Bailundo, while under colonial administration, were significantly limited in the influence they were allowed to wield. They were put in charge of collecting taxes, solving local disputes, maintaining local infrastructure, and similar tasks. Their influence was strictly limited to the boundaries of the local administrative district. If they failed to comply with the tasks they were given by colonial administrators, they would be beaten. This subservience to colonial authorities reduced the prestige and local recognition of Bailundo rulers.

=== Post-Angolan independence ===
Following Angola's independence from Portugal, the kingdom would face numerous interferences from the republic's political actors. David Sapata, commissioner of the Bailundo municipality in the late 1970s, aided his friend Benjamin Pesela Tchongolola to become king of Bailundo. This was unusual, as Benjamin was not of royal lineage. Following the death of David in 1979, and appointment of new commissioner, Arão Chitekulu, Benjamin was removed from the throne and replaced by Manuel da Costa (Ekuikui III). Ekuikui also did not carry royal lineage from the throne of Bailundo, however, he was related to the kings of Luvemba. During the Angolan Civil War, Ekuikui was kidnapped in 1980 by UNITA rebels and taken to Jamba. In his place, another king of non-royal lineage was appointed in Bailundo, Augusto Kachytiopololo (Ekuikui IV), under the patronage of Arão Chiteculo. In the 1990s, rebels from UNITA advanced on Bailundo and Andulo and annexed the areas, leading Ekuikui IV to flee Bailundo and head towards Huambo. Ekuikui III at this point resumed his place on the throne. Ekuikui III died in 1998. UNITA now considered the throne to be vacant and a new king was to be chosen under the influence of UNITA. It was decided to look for a king that was of royal blood. Ultimately, Jeremias Lussati was chosen as he was descended from Utondossi, king of Bailundo in the early 1800s. His regnal name was Utondossi II. Following the end of the civil war and the return of Bailundo to the Angolan government's control, Ekuikui IV was reinstated as king of Bailundo.

In 2003, it was reported that Ekuikui IV was considered to be the most powerful of traditional rulers in Angola. Former king Utondossi II returned to Bailundo sometime between 2003 and 2005. Traditional authorities were split on whether to recognise Utondossi II or Ekuikui IV as the legitimate ruler of Bailundo. In 2008, Utondossi was attacked and killed in the town of Lunge.

In 2010, a statue of Ekuikui II was built in Bailundo district.

In January 2012, Ekuikui IV was found dead. He was succeeded by Ekuikui V. Ekuikui V sometimes dubbed himself as the "king of (all) Ovimbundu". In early 2021, Ekuikui V was sentenced to six years in prison by the Provincial Court of Huambo (TPH) for his implication in a murder in 2017. Ekuikui V had issued a judgment in a traditional court case, finding Jacinto Kamutali Epalangana guilty of killing a child. Following the judgment, Jacinto was beaten to death. (Note: Capital punishment in Angola was legally abolished in 1992, and traditional authorities are expected to follow the constitution while making judgments in traditional court systems.) In response to the charge, Ekuikui planned a foot march scheduled for March 15 from Bailundo to Luanda to protest his sentence.

On the 3 March 2021, he was ousted from the throne following a meeting of the Angolan Association of Traditional Authorities (ASSAT). Ekuikui V had previously claimed to be the president of ASSAT, despite no election confirming him as such. He was accused of various offences, such as forcing a son of his predecessor, Ekuikui IV, to walk around Bailundo naked. He was also accused of witchcraft, concentration of powers, and illegal sales of land. It was elected at the time that João Kawengo Kasanji would replace Ekuikui V as king, and that he would take the regnal name of Tchingala TChangungu Vangalule Mbulu. Ekuikui refused to accept the decision to remove him from the throne, and denied all of the aforementioned accusations.

In March 2021, it was announced that Isaac Francisco Lucas Somaquesenje had been installed as king of Bailundo, with the regnal name Tchongolola Tchongonga Ekuikui VI. The enthronement ceremony was attended by the provincial governor and other guests. Part of the ceremony included the newly appointed king sitting at the entrance of his official residence and collecting a basket containing white cornmeal (omemba). This was then fed to an animal which was later sacrificed. The king later received a sword (ondelia), signifying his traditional power. Tchongolola Tchongonga is a grandson of the former king, Ekuikui IV. He was elected to the throne by the court of Ombala (a council of elders) in May 2021, receiving 153 votes out of a total of 206 voters. João Kawengo Kasanji in contrast, only received 31 votes.

== Bailundo Monarchs ==
The known list of Bailundo monarchs is as follows: (Note: Most of the information, including dates, in this king list was provided by Ekuikui IV and represents a sort of 'official' listing. Utondossi II, notably, is not included in the official list due to a dispute over his legitimacy versus that of Ekuikui IV.) (Note: John K. Thornton's A History of West Central Africa To 1850 presents a different chronology from what is found on Ekuikui IV's official king list. Katyavala, for example, is said to reign until 1730. It is unclear which is more accurate.)

- Katyavala I (~1700–1720)
- Jahulo I (~1720–?)
- Samandalu (1771–1774)
- Chingui (1774–1776)
- Chingui II (1776–1778)
- Kapangano (1778–1780)
- Elanga Ngongo, Ekuikui the Elder I (1780–1800)
- Numa I (1800–1800)
- Hundungulo I (1800–1810)
- Tchissende the Elder I (1810–1811)
- Jungulo (1811–1818)
- Gunji (1818–1818)
- Tchivukuvuku Tchama Tchongonga (1818–1818)
- Utondossi (1818–1832)
- Bonji (1833–1842)
- Bongue (1842–1861)
- Tchissende II (1816–1869)
- Vassovava (1869–1872)
- Katiavala II (1872–1875)
- Ekongoliohombo (1875–1876)
- Ekuikui II Cikundiakundia Cipuka Kaliwa la Njila (1876–1890)
- Numa II (1890–1892/1896) (Note: Sources give two dates for the end of his reign.)
- Morna (1895–1896)
- Kangovi (1897–1898)
- Hundungulo II (1898–1900)
- Kalandula (1900–1902)
- Mutu-ya-Kevela (1902–1903)
- Tchissende III (1904–1911)
- Jahulo II (1911–1935)
- Mussitu (1935–1938)
- Tchinendele (1938–1948)
- Filipe Kapoko (1948–1970)
- Félix Numa Candimba (1970–1977/1982)
- Benjamin Pesela Tchongolola (1982–1985)
- Manuel da Costa, Ekuikui III (1977–1980, 1992–1998) (Note: Alternate source suggests the dates 1985–1996.)
- Augusto Kachytiopololo, Ekuikui IV (1980–?, 2002–2012)
- Utondossi II (1996–1999, 2003/5–2008)
- Armindo Francisco Kalupeteka, Ekuikui V (2012–2021)
- Isaac Francisco Lucas Somaquesenje, Tchongolola Tchongonga Ekuikui VI (2021–present)

== See also ==
- Baixa de Cassanje
- Cingolo
- Citata
- Civula
- Ciyaka
- Ekekete
- Kakonda
- Kalukembe
- Mbunda Kingdom
- Kingdom of Ndulu
- Kingdom of Ndongo
- Ngalangi
- Viye
