= Viye =

Angolan kingdom

Viye (also known as Bié, Bieno, or Bihe) was one of the traditional Ovimbundu kingdoms, located in the central plateau of Angola. Its capital city was Ecovongo.

During the 18th and 19th centuries, the kingdom was an important crossroads through which Central African and Southern African trade flowed.

== Characteristics ==
Viye was originally an independent kingdom, later becoming a Portuguese vassal. The kingdom was led by a king, who had an assortment of nobles subordinate to him. The kings of Viye, particularly in the late 1700s and early 1800s, contested with their nobility in a mutual effort to gain supremacy.

In 1797, Portuguese trader João Nepomucena Correia described that the kings of Viye had a group of wholly dependent servants (known as mocotas), drawn from the slaves held by his predecessors, among others. The slaves were mostly derived from debtors and could not be sold. These servants served as ministers and war leaders (known as Quisongos). In the mid-19th century, Hungarian adventurer Lázló Magyar observed that the kingdom was divided into two classes of nobility; elombe ya soma, or descendants of rulers, and the elombe ya sekulu, heads of local territories.

Subjects paid taxes in cattle and chickens, grains, corn, beans, potatoes, manioc, and pumpkins. Various fruits were also produced in the kingdom, while women baked bread and made alcohol. In the 1840s, around 80,000 people lived in Viye. Locals hunted elephants and raised cattle. Trade goods such as wax, ivory, and slaves were also sold in Viye.

== Succession ==
In 1797, Portuguese trader João Nepomucena Correia wrote that kings of Viye were selected by the mocotas (slaves) and nobles of the realm, who voted for the most respected and powerful of the sons and brothers of the previous king.

== History ==
=== Origins ===
The origins of Viye are unclear, and there are conflicting narratives that attempt to put together an origin story for the kingdom. Generally, a ruler known as Viye is credited with founding the kingdom, sometime around the early 1700s.

One tradition suggests there was a hunter, known as Vingongombanda Kopeta. One day, he successfully hunted an elephant and rushed to the village for assistance in transporting the animal. However, villagers at the time believed only those with 'sacred powers' could kill an elephant, and Kopeta was expelled from the village. When Kopeta returned to the elephant, he found it had disappeared and followed the tracks it had left behind, eventually leading him to the village of Etalala on the right bank of the Kukema River. Kopeta ended up settling in the village, and taught himself how to hunt with the use of oxen. Whenever he travelled to the village he would ask the local herders, "Olongombe Viye", meaning, "let the oxen come". The villagers nicknamed him Viye because of this. Ultimately, he attempted to go after the elephant once more, leading him to Mount Lubya. There, he found a girl named Kahanda who later became his wife. Kopeta abandoned the search for the elephant and returned to Etalala, where the ruling oSama agreed to build him a village of his own. Kopeta and Kahanda had a son named Eyambi ya Viye. Later in life, Kopeta grew ill and Viye ran to a spring to fetch water for his ailing father. While at the spring, he heard a bellowing voice informing him of his father's death. He rushed back to the village of Etalala. Upon informing the village of his experience, a local diviner informed him he heard the voice of Vingongombanda, and that he must build a village in Ekovongo (call of the oxen). Their descendants would go on to form Viye.

A second oral tradition, from oSoma Afonso Viti, suggests Vingongombanda Viye came from Humbi. He raised cattle and was a renowned fighter, and is the father of the kingdom of Viye. A certain ruler of Viye was appointed to settle judicial matters, pay subsidiary kingdoms and tributes. In these matters, he demanded that oxen should come first and, while collecting these fees he would state "Viye", meaning "let the oxen come, we will talk about the rest later". Hence, rulers would be nicknamed 'Viye'.

A third oral tradition comes from Hungarian traveller Lázló Magyar, who stayed in Viye from 1848 til 1857. While there, he married Princess Omoro, daughter of the oSoma of Viye. She had been educated by her father, Kayangula, of the history of the kingdom and transferred this knowledge to Lázló. According to oral traditions at the time, the ancestors of the rulers of Viye arrived about '300 years ago'. They travelled from Morupu (Mulopwe) towards the west. As they migrated westward, they fought many battles along the way, ultimately settling on the banks of Lwandu River. There, they waged war on their neighbours for plunder, ultimately exterminating their closest neighbours, before eventually turning on each other and fighting amongst themselves. After some time, the fighting came to an end and a group left those lands and migrated across the Cuanza, in Malemba and Kisendi. Here, they learned to cultivate the land and settled into villages, subjugating neighbouring peoples. One of the villages that was founded was led by Viye, who went south and overcame the Vangangela who lived near the Kukema. Here, he founded the present Viye. Due to the nature of migration, the kingdom was a mixture of Ovimbundu peoples and those of Imbangala heritage. Kings, upon their deaths, had two burials - one burial was held in the capital city, and a second was held in Bomba. The enthronement ceremony of a king involved eating a "bearded man of a different nation" (Cannibalism was a custom done by Imbangalas). The founder of the kingdom, Viye, was ultimately killed and succeeded by Gongo Hamulanda.

A fourth oral tradition is transcribed by Serpa Pinto, who lived in Viye in the late 1800s, with some slight differences. All oral traditions agree Viye's origins are in Humbi, located in the modern-day Huíla province.

Ulundo, the third king of Viye, is credited with expanding the kingdoms borders, particularly southwards toward Cuquema River. He also expelled the Ganguela from the kingdom. It's unclear who succeeded him - some oral traditions suggest Ulundo was succeeded by his brother, Kibaba. In his place they installed Ulundos son, Dallo, as king of Viye. More recent oral traditions instead suggest Ulundo was succeeded by Eiyambi, who in-turn was succeeded by Kangombe. These traditions appear to skip kings in-between.

=== Portuguese era ===
The Portuguese learned of Viye in 1755, when Domingos da Fonseca Negrão explored the area.

By the end of the 18th century, Viye had several tributary states. Two distinct lists were provided, only three years apart from one another. The first list includes Kabanda, Kapollo, Kakiongo, Gambos, and Kitungo as tributary states. The second lists Guruca, Cunhaco, Trumba, and Candavita. The differences may indicate incorrect observations or political rearrangement.

Along with the neighbouring kingdom of Bailundo, Viye engaged in considerable fighting with the Portuguese Empire in the 1770s, ultimately leading to the kingdoms vassalage under the Portuguese. King Jahulu had conflict with his brother, Kangombe, and sold him into slavery to the Portuguese. The Portuguese had him baptised, and when they waged war against Bailundu in 1774, they brought Kangombe with them and aided him in overthrowing his brother. Kangombe then engaged with conflict with Jahulu, who fled to nearby Bumba. Ultimately, Kangombe won, and many of Jahulu's forces were sold into slavery. Oral traditions provided by Serpa Pinto suggest instead that, during the reign of Jahulu, nobles travelled to Luanda with several loads of ivory and asked the local governor to free him. The governor agreed, and they returned to Viye to depose Jahulu.

Kangombe waged wars on his neighbours during his reign, relocating peoples into his realm and expanding his territory. Kangombe was succeeded by his son, Kawewe. Kawewe ultimately faced mass-revolts, and was killed. He was replaced by his brother, Moma, sometime around 1797. In 1785, it was reported that the kingdom of Viye had a total of 2000 guns.

Despite Viye's official status as a vassal, Portugal's control over the kingdom was limited. In 1810, the local captain-major appointed to Viye reported that the Soba (king) ruled Viye and he simply followed orders. He had no control over the kingdom, and lacked the knowledge to list any Viye tributaries.

In the 1800s, Viye and the Bailundo engaged in frequent, violent conflict and wars between one another. In 1848, there was a war of succession in Viye. The conflict between Viye and Bailundo largely stalled during the latter half of the 1800s, in-part due to the influence of Christian missionaries.

In 1890, Viye revolted against Portuguese rule, led by King Ndunduma. Viye was then taken over by the Portuguese with assistance from Viye's rival kingdom, Bailundo, and would represent the last time the kingdom resisted against Portuguese rule. The king fled and attempted to resist capture, however, the Portuguese threatened to destroy Viye if he did not give himself up. Reverend W. H. Sanders, a protestant missionary, convinced the king to give in, to which he eventually agreed. They surrendered him to Captain Paiva Couceiro, and hostilities ceased. The king was arrested on 4 December 1890, and died in exile nine years later. In 2009, two statues of Ndunduma were erected near Cuíto to commemorate his resistance to Portuguese rule.

Following the surrender of Ndunduma, local sub-chiefs elected a new king to rule Vie.

=== Modern times ===
Viye is currently represented by a recognised traditional authority within Angola, Soma Afonso Viti.

== Monarchs ==
The following is a list of monarchs of Viye:

- Viye (c. 1700/50 - ?) (Note: Gladwyn M. Childs suggests that Viye must have been founded around 1750, rather than 1700.)
- Gongo Hamulanda (? - ?)
- Civava (or Cibala) (? - c.1770)
- Ndalu (or Ulundo) (? - ?)
- Eiyambi (? - ?) or Kibaba (? - ?), Dallo (? - ?) (Note: Oral traditions provide conflicting accounts as to who succeeded Ulundo.)
- Njilahulu (or Ndjilahulu / Jahulu) (1770 - 1774/8)
- Kangombe (1774/8 - 1795)
- Kawewe (? - ?)
- Moma, Basso-Baba (c. 1797 - 1813)
- Vasovava (1813 - 1833)
- Mbandua (or Mbandwa) (1833- 1839)
- Kakembembe (1839 - 1841)
- Ungulu (or Hundu ngulu) (1841 - 1842)
- Lyãmbula (1842 - 1847)
- Kayangula (1847 - 1850)
- Mukinda (1850 - 1857)
- Ngumbenge (or Nguvenge) (1857 - 1859)
- Konya Cilemo (or Kilemo) (1860 - 1883)
- Ciponge; Njamba Ya Mina I (1883 - 1886)
- Ciyoka (1886 - 1888)
- Cikwnyo Ndunduma (1888 - 1890)
- Kalufele Kaningululu (1890 - 1891)
- Ciyuka (1891 - 1893)
- Kavova (1893 - 1915)
- Ngungu (1915 - 1928)
- Ciyuka (1928 - 1940)
- Congolola (1941 - 1963)
- Kavova (? - ?)
- Njanjo (? - ?)
- Ciyoka Ciponge Mucikita (? - ?)
- Daniel Saviemba (? - ?)
- Lisapa (Nyarea) (? - ?)
- António Cisingi (? - ?)
- Afonso Viti Wapende (? - present)

== See also ==
- Portuguese conquest of Viye
- Bailundo
- Baixa de Cassanje
- Cingolo
- Citata
- Civula
- Ciyaka
- Ekekete
- Kakonda
- Kalukembe
- Mbunda Kingdom
- Kingdom of Ndulu
- Kingdom of Ndongo
- Ngalangi
