= First Portuguese–Ovimbundu War =

Portuguese Military Conflict With Ovimbundu

First Portuguese–Ovimbundo War
- Part of Portuguese colonization of Africa
Date	1774–1778
Location	Angola
Result	Portuguese victory

Belligerents
Kingdom of Portugal	Kingdom of Bailundo; Kingdom of Viye; Kingdom of Quingolo

Commanders and leaders
(Portugal) António de Lencastre; Kangombe I	Chingui I Ndjilahulu I Chingui II

The First Portuguese–Ovimbundu War, also known as the War of 1774–1778, was an armed conflict between the kingdoms of the Ovimbundu people, mainly in the figure of the Bailundo and Viye kingdoms, against the Kingdom of Portugal.

The conflict was motivated by Portuguese ambition to expand overseas, putting the Ovimbundu people against European immigrants and representatives.

== Background ==
The fertile highlands of Benguela, also known as nano, were traditionally cultivated by the Bantu people. The early 17th century invasion by the Imbangala people led to a merger of the two populations and the subsequent creation of the Ovimbundu kingdoms. The Benguela region was first explored by Portuguese merchants in the mid-17th century, starting the trade in slaves, ivory, beeswax and rubber.

The first attacks by the Portuguese attempted to reach the Ovimbundu people took place in the 17th century in the conflicts against Queen Ana de Sousa Ginga, in 1645. In 1660, a new Lusitanian expedition was unsuccessful and repelled by the still politically disorganized Ovimbundu people.

Realising the risks of Portuguese influence, the Ovimbundu kingdoms began to establish themselves at the turn of the 17th century to the 18th century, with emphasis on the investiture of Katyavala Bwila I, in the Bailundo kingdom (1700) and in the kingdom of Viye (1750).

Occasional clashes between the Portuguese and the Ovimbudo occurred in the 18th century, during the opening of overseas exploration routes to the east, areas still strongly resistant to foreign influence. In an attempt at a more peaceful southern route, the Portuguese waged the Galangue War (1768-1769) against the Galangue kingdom, where they defeated King Caconda, managing to force the recapture of the Caconda Fortress.

== Conflict ==
The conflict unfolded in five moments, two of them against the Bailundo kingdom, two against the kingdom of Viye and one against an Ovimbundu coalition.

=== Coalition battle ===
Realising the results of the Galangue war, with the Portuguese plan to invade the plateau, the kingdoms of Quingolo and Bailundo formed an alliance, with the support of Viye, in 1774, to resist the invasion, led by the Bailundo king Chingui I.

The coalition troops repelled the invasion, undertaking great pursuit, causing the Portuguese to return to Caconda. The Quingolo kingdom, however, was strongly weakened.

=== First attack on Viye ===
To undermine the strength of Viye, at the time the strongest of the Ovimbundu kingdoms, Portugal sent troops to the border where they began attacking villages, between 1774 and 1775, suffocating local agricultural production.

Portugal was unable to take the kingdom, but the strategy proved to be successful, as it fueled the formation of a rival faction to the Biennial king Ndjilahulu I, led by the pretender Kangombe I.

=== Battle of Lumbanganda ===
From Caconda, a military column was formed to advance on Bailundo, in 1776. The attack was considered brutal, which culminated in the retreat of Soma Inene (king) Chingui I and his force to a slit located in the Lumbanganda mountain range.

The hiding place was discovered after Inaculo (queen) Bailunda handed over her position, culminating in the arrest of Chingui I and herself. Captives at home in Luanda, their son Elanga Ngongo Chikundiakundi Puka Kaliliwa Lonjila Ekuikui was born.

=== Great Bailunda battle ===
The Portuguese invested Chiliva Bambangulu Chingui II, son of the former monarch, demanding loyalty from him, which he shortly after rejected. In the absence of fortification, the Portuguese returned to Caconda, while Chingui II reorganized his troops and attempted to fortify the villages. The Portuguese responded promptly, sending troops to the border, attacking villages from 1776 onwards, while they themselves were not fully organized.

In 1777 the Bailundos tried to interrupt the Lusitanian advance, leading to a situation of inconclusive warfare until 1778.

In 1778, taking advantage of the calamitous situation caused by a drought, a Portuguese column advanced on Halã-Vala, the capital of the Bailundo kingdom, as well as on the ombalas of Andulo and Viye. King Chingui II dies in battle, without his body being able to be recovered. The Bailundo kingdom loses the povoations of Viye and Andulo, with the latter becoming a puppet kingdom.

In Luanda, Ekuikui I is invested as Soma Inene (king) Bailundo, this being a monarch favourable to Portugal.

=== Great biennial battle ===
Aware of the difficulty of attacking Bailundo and Viye at the same time, the Portuguese began to put into practice the strategy of defeating the kingdoms from the inside out. Thus, mercenaries were sent to support Kangombe I's faction.

A guerrilla strategy remained between 1776 and 1778, when, after defeating the Bailundos, Portugal gathered forces to try to defeat the Bienos.

In 1778, in a major battle, Cuíto was invaded by Portuguese troops. King Ndjilahulu I was deposed, taking Kangombe I in his place.

== See also ==
- Bailundo revolt
- Portuguese Angola
- Portuguese Africa
