= Cingolo =

Angolan kingdom

Cingolo (also known as Quingolo) was one of the traditional independent Ovimbundu kingdoms in Angola.

In 1774–6, Cingolo fought a war against the Portuguese alongside Bailundu.

== See also ==
- Citata
- Civula
- Ciyaka
- Ekekete
- Kakonda
- Kalukembe
- Kingdom of Ndulu
- Ngalangi
- Viye
