= Artur Nunes =

Angolan musician

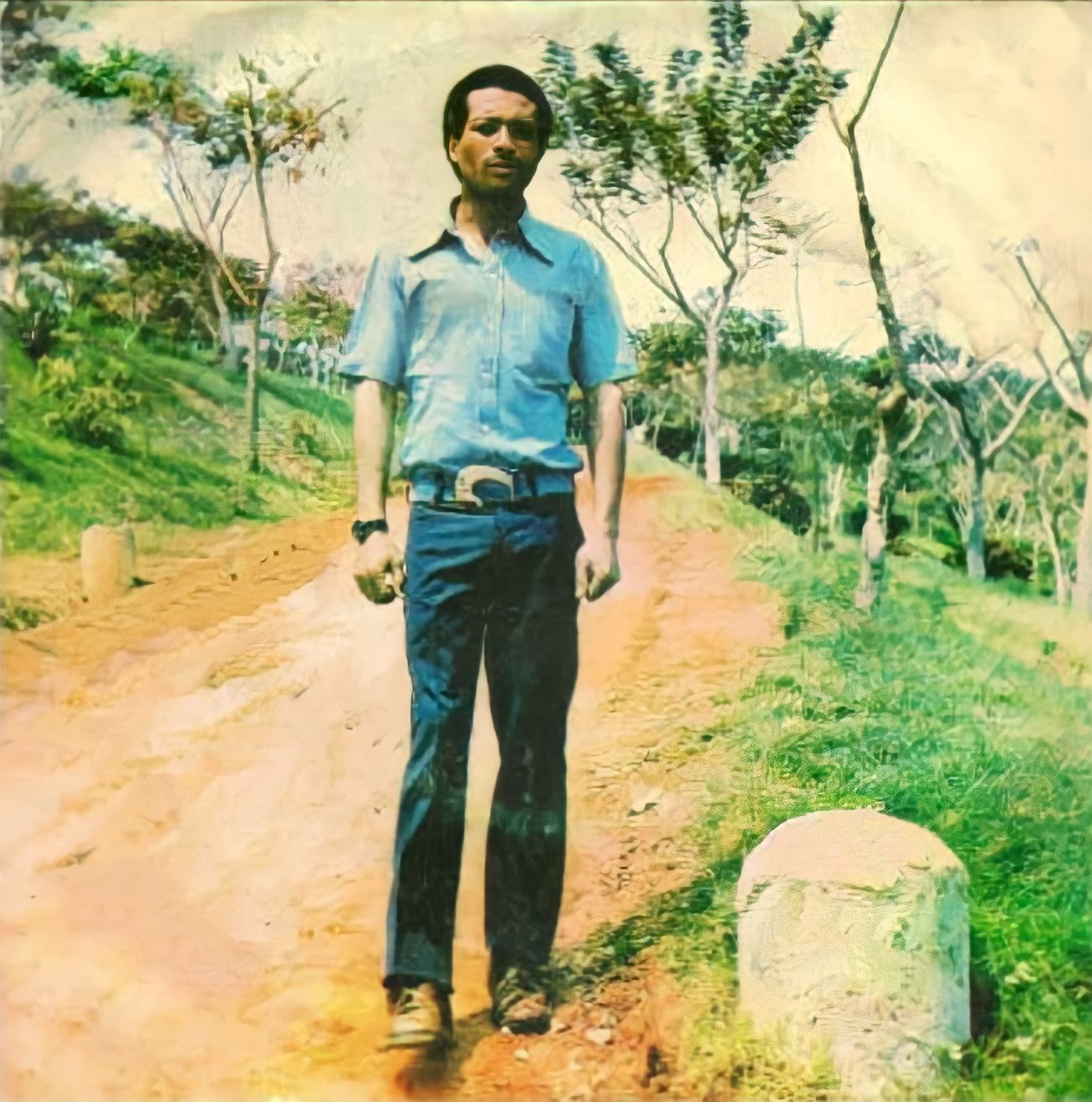
- Born: Artur de Jesus Nunes; 17 December 1950; Sambizanga, Luanda, Angola
- Died: 27 May 1977 (aged 26); Sambizanga, Luanda, Angola
- Cause of death: Assassination
- Burial place: Cemitério de Santa Ana, Luanda
- Occupations: Singer and member of the fapla (armed forces)
- Years active: 1972–1977
- Organization: FAPLA Povo Alliance
- Notable work: Artur Nunes – Tia ft. Jovens do Prenda
- Political party: People's Movement for the Liberation of Angola MPLA

Artur Nunes (17 December 1950 – 27 May 1977) was an Angolan musician, composer, and activist. In his time, Nunes was one of the most influential voices and composers in the pre-independence days of revolutionary Angola. Nunes, along with David Zé, Urbano de Castro and many others, was a part of a group of musicians called the FAPLA-Povo Alliance who had the role to spread and divulge awareness to Angolan citizens helping a movement of revolution. He was nicknamed "O Espiritual" ("The Spiritual One") due to his expertise in manifesting his feelings in a rather contagious way as if he could communicate with souls.

His music career was short-lived, but he recorded a dozen singles, plus two songs on the 33 rpm collection Rebita and Movimento. He was kidnapped and later assassinated by a group that dissolved from the MPLA during a failed attempt at a coup that took place on 27 May 1977, and his music was banned from radio for more than a decade but nonetheless, Nunes is now regarded as one of Angola's most important musicians and public figures.

== Early and personal life ==
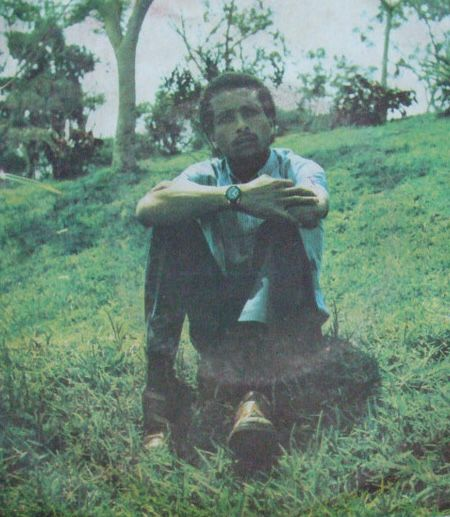
Portrait of Artur Nunes

Son of María Luísa José Neto Fernandes and Artur Manuel Nunes, an Angolan mother and American father, Artur Nunes was born in Bairro Cuba, Sambizanga, Luanda. He frequented Escola de São Paulo e da Liga Nacional Africana in Bairro Cuba, otherwise known as Musseque Mota. He later on discovered his interest in music, political consciousness, and notion of the injustice his people were facing in Sambizanga, his neighborhood, where at the age of 14 his Cape-Verdean friend Sissi Mindo taught him the basics of how to play the guitar.

Later in his life, Nunes learned the trade of locksmithing and ended up getting a job as one. Nonetheless, he quit his job to pursue his career as a musician and activist.

== Career ==
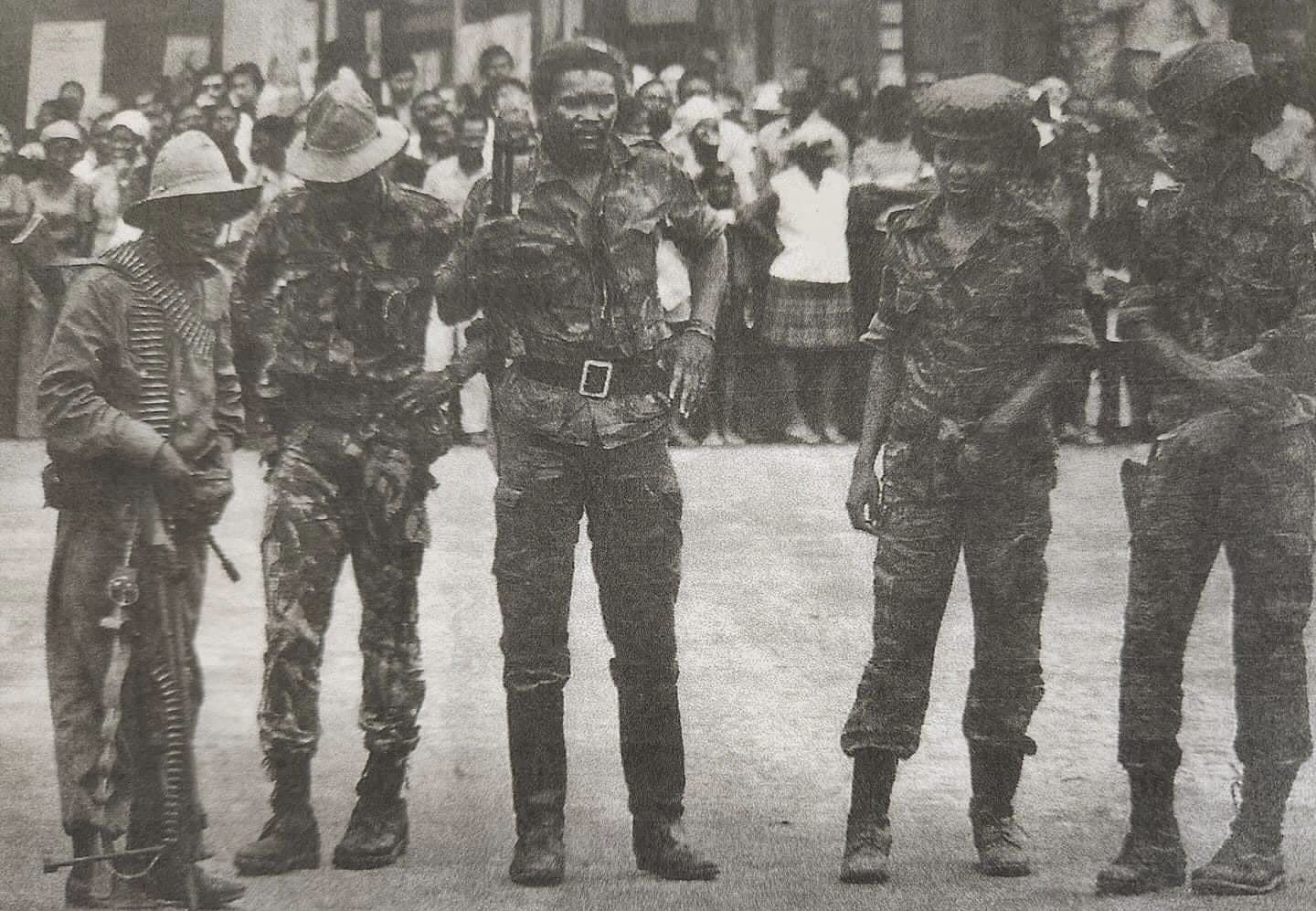
Unidentified Bissau-Guinean soldier, David Zé, "Preta Fula", Fatinha and Artur Nunes on military duty

Between 1972 and 1976, Nunes recorded 24 singles/LPs in the musical styles of Rebita, Movimento, Kuaba, and Merengue.

In the early 1970s, he met a couple of backing bands like Os Jovens do Prenda and Os Kiezos who accompanied him in his songs. He became a part of a trio which is nowadays known as "Trio da Saudade" with fellow singers David Zé and Urbano de Castro who later went on to become the most popular musicians of the early 1970s in Angola, a period which is described by music historians as the "golden era" of Angolan music. Their music was primary to the new cultural and nationalistic sense of identification that developed in their country at the time, turning them into main targets of the Portuguese authorities PIDE. They were known for politically charged music which was a mixture of Semba, Merengue, Rumba, and Bolero.

Nunes was involved in everything that was about cultural manifestation in Sambizanga, starting with the ephemeral "Mini-rhythm", being integrated in Kazukuta groups, namely the Turma do Bairro de Cuba, along with his uncle Zé Kimbomba diá Ngola. It all started in 1970 when he founded Luanda Show along with Ti Pirigo, Malex, Jeremias António, Candinho Adão and Mário Rui Silva in its line-up. This, before going solo and collaborating with some of the best backing bands at that time like Os Kiezos, Os Jovens do Prenda, Conjunto Merengue and África Ritmos. and along with Kissanguela, the political intervention musical group that came to dominate the post-independence musical scene.

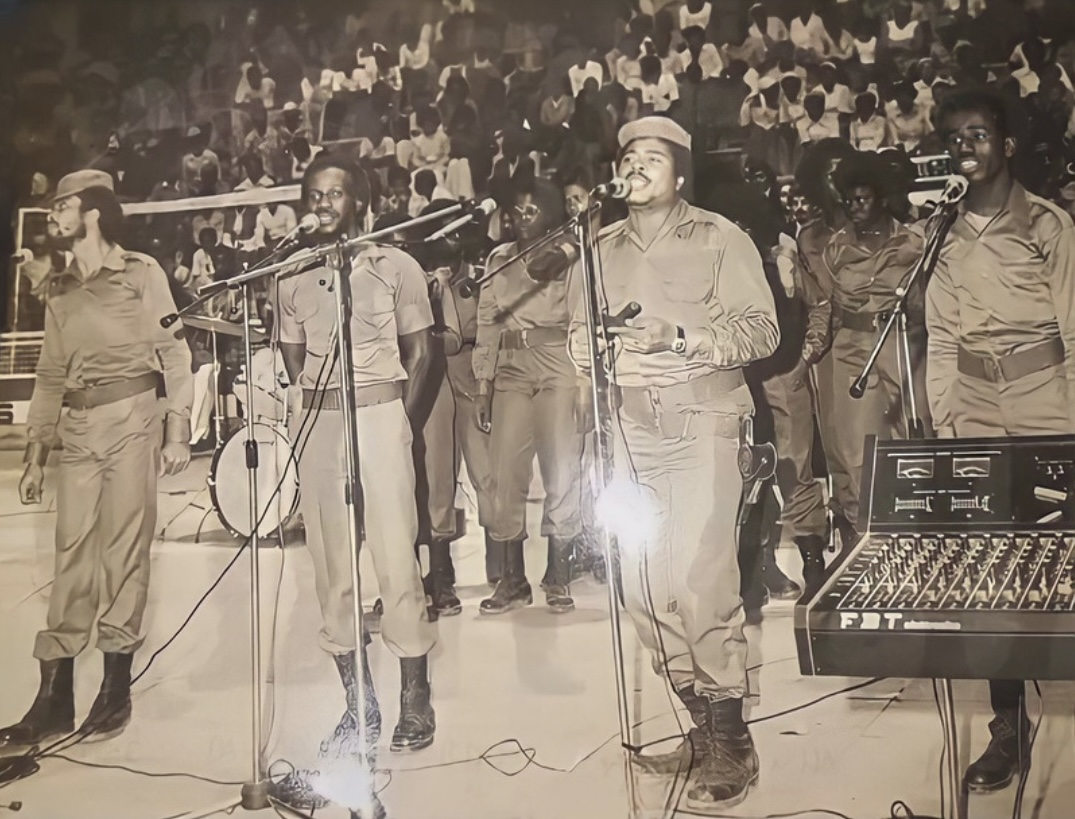
Artur Nunes, David Zé, Urbano de Castro and Santocas (in order) performing in a show with the FAPLA Povo Alliance.

During and after the struggle for Angola's independence, Nunes, Urbano de Castro, David Zé, along with other musicians started to be celebrated and appreciated by Angolans, PALOPs, and even their president Agostinho Neto, who commissioned them to form a squad representing a musical branch of the FAPLA called the FAPLA Povo Alliance. They went on to attend the independence celebrations of Cape Verde, Mozambique, São Tomé and Príncipe and Guinea-Bissau, where they would perform their songs on tours with the president, as a sort of embassy of Angolan culture, Pan-Africanism and support for other revolutions abroad.

== Legacy ==
After the end of the Angolan Civil War, a renewed interest in Nunes' music developed, and in 2001, an annual festival called Super Caldo do Poeira was established to celebrate his music and other early pioneers of Angolan music. In 2004, a double CD released by Rádio Nacional de Angola entitled Memorias was released, collecting and divulging a substantial part of the singer's work.

== Discography ==
=== Singles and EPs (Solo) : 14 ===
Title	Label	Catalog Number	Accompanied by	Year
Oh Yo Mona N'denge / Chico (7")	Rebita	R : 1015	Os Kiezos	1972
Jota / Dituzu (7")	Rebita	R : 1085	Os Kiezos	1972
Laura / Não Sei Porquê (7")	Rebita	R : 1090	África Ritmos	1973
Zinha / Njila (7")	Rebita	R : 1091	Jovens do Prenda	1973
Belina / Njila Ya Kuaku (7")	Rebita	R : 1132	Jovens do Prenda	1973
Kalumba Kiami / Kizua Ki Ngi Fua (7")	Rebita	R : 1133	Jovens do Prenda	1973
Mana / Tia (7")	Rebita	R : 1134	Jovens do Prenda	1973
Sambizanga / Minha Rola (7")	Rebita	R : 1195	África Ritmos	1974
Kitadi Kiami / Ngongo Tondomona (7")	Rebita	R : 1196	África Ritmos	1974
Ku Muxitu Buala Ana N'Gola (7")	Musangola	MFL : 006	Jovens do Prenda	1975
Mena / Nguma (7")	Kuaba	MFL : 009	Jovens do Prenda	1975
Tété / António (7")	Kuaba	SKMA : 7805	Jovens do Prenda	1975
Ana N'gola Ya Dila / Wawe Mua Ngola (7")	Rebita	R : 3003	Jovens do Prenda	1976
Imperialismo / Kubanga Kuana Ngola (7")	Movimento	MRA : 3005	Conjunto Merengue	1976

=== Compilations : 2 ===
Title	Label	Catalog Number	Accompanied by	Year
Reviver (CD, Comp, RE)	Teta Lando Produções	CD-0283.2	Os Kiezos & Jovens do Prenda	1980
Memorias (2xCD, Comp)	Rádio Nacional de Angola	RNAPQ20	Os Kiezos, Jovens do Prenda, África Ritmos & Conjunto Merengue	2004
