= David Zé =

Angolan musician

Personal details
- Born: David Gabriel José Ferreira; 23 August 1944 Luanda, Angola
- Died: 27 May 1977 (aged 32) Sambizanga, Luanda, Angola
- Manner of death: Assassination
- Resting place: Unknown
- Party: People's Movement for the Liberation of Angola

David Gabriel José Ferreira (23 August 1944 — 27 May 1977) was an Angolan musician, composer and activist. He began his singing career while Angola was still under the rule of the Portuguese Empire and his music often expressed left-wing and anti-colonialist sentiments. David Zé, along with Artur Nunes, Urbano de Castro and others, was a part of a group of musicians called the FAPLA-Povo Alliance who had the role to spread social and political awareness to Angolan citizens to start a laborist movement to reform Angola after its revolution. He was given the official position of Director of Music in the Culture Ministry in the incoming MPLA regime.

His career only lasted for about a decade, but he managed to establish himself as one of the biggest names in the "Golden Age" of Angolan music, the early 1970s. He was kidnapped and later murdered by an unknown group of people who have been described as "fractionists" that dissolved from the MPLA during a failed attempt at a coup that took place in the 27th of May of 1977 and his music was banned from the radio for more than a decade.

== Early and personal life ==
David Gabriel José Ferreira was born on August 23, 1944, in Quifangondo, Luanda Province. He was the son of Gabriel José Ferreira and Carolina José Afonso, both choristers of the Methodist Church. He attended primary and secondary education in the province of Cuanza Norte. For a while he worked at a foundry in Hoji Ya Henda.

In November 1976 he married Maria Trindade, while on military duty in São Tomé and Príncipe. He had four children, Miguel Gabriel Ferreira, Maria Carolina David Ferreira, Deolinda David Gabriel Ferreira and David Gabriel José Ferreira.

== Career ==
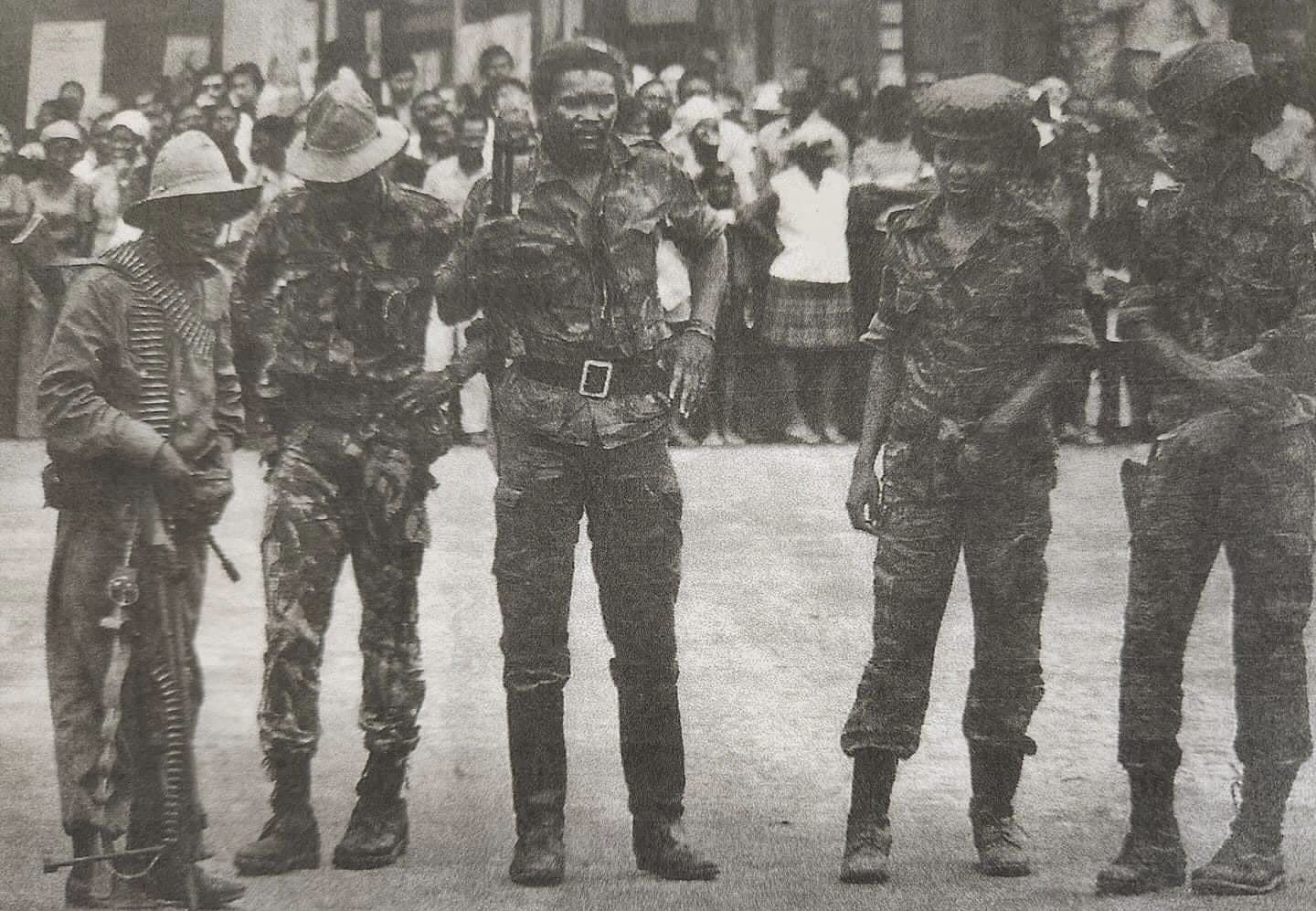
Unidentified Bissau-Guinean soldier, David Zé, Fatinha, Urbano de Castro and Artur Nunes on military duty

In 1966, David Zé met the singer Urbano de Castro, who convinced him to pursue a musical career. He met with a brand new Jovens do Prenda who were just getting started and went on to release his first singles "Dilangue" and "Kadika Zeka".

Along with de Castro and Artur Nunes he formed a trio of the most popular singers of the early 1970s, a period which is described by music historians as the "golden era" of Angolan music. Their music was central to the new cultural and nationalistic sense of identity which developed in Angola at the time, making them targets of the Portuguese authorities. They were known for politically charged music which were a mixture of Semba, Merengue, Rumba and Bolero.

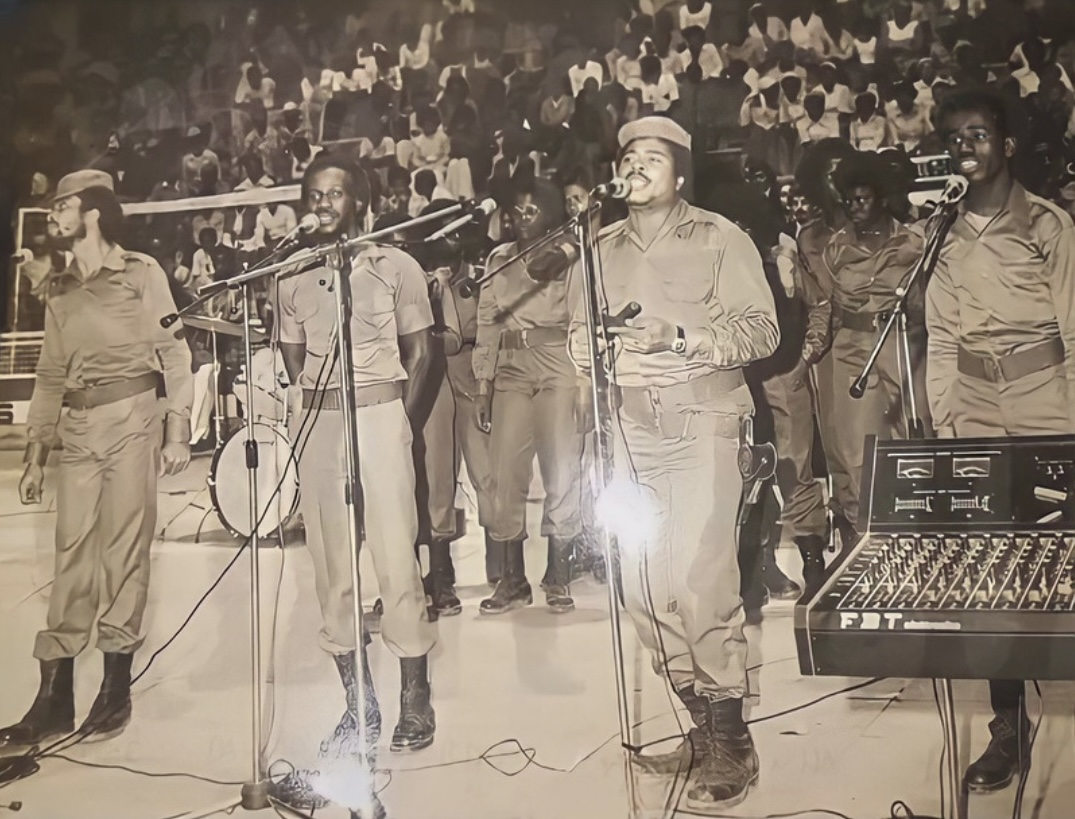
Artur Nunes, David Zé, Urbano de Castro and Santocas (in order) performing in a show with the FAPLA Povo Alliance.

His 1975 album "Mutudi Ua Ufolo/Viúva Da Liberdade", released in the year of Angola's independence, is considered his most celebrated work and among the most iconic albums from that era.

After Angola obtained independence, David Zé enjoyed great appreciation from the newly installed president Agostinho Neto, who commissioned him to attend the independence celebrations of Mozambique, São Tomé and Príncipe and Guinea-Bissau, where he performed the song "Quem Matou Cabral". He was the coordinator of the musical group Aliança Fapla-Povo, who accompanied Neto on all his tours, whether home or abroad, and was meant as a sort of itinerant embassy of Angolan culture.

== Kidnapping and death ==
On 27 May 1977, Nito Alves, a hardline member of the MPLA and leader of the Fractionist group, launched a failed coup against Agostinho Neto, which lead to a wave of reprisals that left thousand dead. Zé, alongside fellow musicians de Castro and Nunes were among those killed, but no official account of their death exists.

David Zé was seen as a supporter of Neto, which he made abundantly clear in his lyrics, so the reasons for which he was singled out by the regime remain unclear. According to some sources, he was a member of the coup or at the very least, sympathetic towards it, while historian Marissa J. Moorman maintains that the popularity of MPLA's musicians began to eclipse that of its leaders, who were beginning to be seen increasingly as out of touch, and that worried the authorities enough to eliminate them.

== Legacy ==
After his death, David Zé's music was unofficially banned from radio and remained banned for more than a decade after his death. The clampdown on free speech and cultural activities that followed the coup, as well as the demise of the Companhia De Discos De Angola record label, which released much of Zé's music, further contributed to the erasure of his legacy.

After the end of the Angolan Civil War, a renewed interest in Zé's music developed. In 2001, an annual festival called "Super Caldo do Poeira" was established to celebrate the music of David Zé and other early pioneers of semba music. In 2004, a double CD edited by Rádio Nacional de Angola and titled Memorias de David Zé was released, collecting a substantial part of the singer's work.

The song "Friends" by Nas and Damian Marley samples 'Undenge Uami', which appears on Mutudi Ua Ufolo.

== Discography ==
=== Singles and EPs : 12 ===
Title	Label	Catalog Number	Accompanied by	Year
Dilangue / Rosita (7")	Rebita	R : 1073	Jovens do Prenda	1972
Sofredora / Kadika Zeka (7")	Rebita	R : 1074	Jovens do Prenda	1972
Candinha / Namorada do Conjunto (7")	Rebita	R : 1126	Águias Reais	1973
Malalanza / Kalumba Yo (7")	Rebita	R : 1127	Águias Reais	1973
Maria Rasgadora / Merengue S. António (7")	Rebita	R : 1128	Águias Reais	1973
Kuala Kituxi / Uma Amiga (7")	Rebita	R : 1169	Águias Reais	1974
Fuma / Rumba Nza Tukine (7")	Rebita	R : 1170	Águias Reais	1974
Lamento de Angélica / Monami Nvunji (7")	Rebita	R : 1212	Jovens do Prenda	1974
Lamento de Paiva / Tuoloia Vizinho(7")	Rebita	R : 1213	Jovens do Prenda	1974
Jingondo / Kalunga Nguma (7")	Rebita	R : 1214	Jovens do Prenda	1974
O Guerrilheiro / Kibela (7")	Movimento	MLP : 1134	Conjunto Merengue	1975
1º De Agosto / Quem Matou Cabral (7")	Movimento	MR : 3002	Conjunto Merengue	1976

=== Compilations : 2 ===
Title	Label	Catalog Number	Accompanied by	Year
Reviver (CD, Comp, RE)	Teta Lando Produções	CD-0283.2	Jovens do Prenda, Águias Reais & Conjunto Merengue	1980
Memorias (2xCD, Comp)	Rádio Nacional de Angola	RNAPQ19	Os Kiezos & Jovens do Prenda	2004

LP Album :

Title	Label	Accompanied by	Catalog Number	Year
Mutudi Ua Ufolo/Viuva Da Liberdade	CDA	Conjunto Merengue	NALP : 6002	1975
