= Sambu Kingdom =

Civilization in ancient Africa

- Capital: Sambo
- Common languages: Umbundu
- Demonym: Sambuan
- Government: Absolute monarchy
- Historical era: 17th-century Africa
- Today part of: Angola

The Sambu Kingdom (Note: Also known as the Sambo Kingdom or the Kingdom of Sambos.) was a pre-colonial Ovimbundu kingdom located in modern-day Angola.
