= Culture of Angola =

The culture of Angola is influenced by the Portuguese. Portugal occupied the coastal enclave Luanda, and later also Benguela, since the 16th/17th centuries, and expanded into the territory of what is now Angola in the 19th/20th centuries, ruling it until 1975. Both countries share prevailing cultural aspects: the Portuguese language and Roman Catholicism. However, present-day Angolan culture is mostly native Bantu, which was mixed with Portuguese culture. The diverse ethnic communities with their own cultural traits, traditions and native languages or dialects include the Ovimbundu, Ambundu, Bakongo, Chokwe, Avambo and other peoples.

== Ethnic groups and languages ==
There are over 100 distinct ethnic groups and languages/dialects in Angola. Although Portuguese is the official language, for many black Angolans it is a second or even third language. The three dominant ethnic groups are the Ovimbundu, Mbundu (better called Ambundu, speaking Kimbundu) and the Bakongo. There are also small numbers of Mestiço (mixed African and European descent) and ethnic white Europeans as well.

=== Ovimbundu ===
The largest ethnolinguistic category, the Ovimbundu, were located in west-central Angola, south of Mbundu-inhabited regions. In 1988 the United States Department of State estimated that they constituted 37 percent of the population. The language of the Ovimbundu is Umbundu.

The core area of the Ovimbundu kingdoms was that part of the Benguela Plateau north of the town of Huambo. Expansion continuing into the twentieth century enlarged their territory considerably, although most Ovimbundu remained in that part of the plateau above 1,200 meters in elevation.

Like most African groups of any size, the Ovimbundu were formed by the mixture of groups of diverse origin (and varying size). Little is known of developments before the seventeenth century, but there is some evidence of additions to the people who occupied the Benguela Plateau at that time. Over time, a number of political entities, usually referred to as kingdoms, were formed. By the eighteenth century, there were twenty-two kingdoms. Thirteen were fully independent; the other nine were largely autonomous but owed tribute to one of the more powerful entities, usually the kingdom of Bailundu, but in some cases Wambu or Ciyaka. By the beginning of the second decade of the twentieth century, effective occupation by the Portuguese had caused a fairly rapid decline in the power of the heads of these kingdoms, but Ovimbundu continued to think of themselves as members of one or another of the groups based on these political units after World War II.

In addition, to the groups that clearly spoke dialects of Umbundu, there were two on the periphery of Ovimbundu distribution: the Mbui, who seemed to straddle the linguistic boundary between the Ovimbundu and the Mbundu; and the Dombe living to the west near the coast, whose language was closely related to Umbundu, although not a dialect of it. The Dombe and several other groups, including the Nganda and the Hanya (who, according to one account, spoke Umbundu dialects) relied on cattle raising, as did their southern neighbors, the Herero and the Ovambo. Still others, typically the old tributary kingdoms, came to speak Umbundu relatively recently.

Until the Portuguese established firm control over their territory, the Ovimbundu – particularly those of the major kingdoms of Bailundu (to the northwest), Bihe (to the northeast), and Wambu (in the center) – played important roles as intermediaries in the slave, ivory, and beeswax trades, acting as carriers, entrepreneurs, and raiders. With the decline of the slave trade in the last decades of the nineteenth century, the entrepreneurs among the Ovimbundu turned to the rubber trade, abandoning the warfare and raiding that had hitherto been integrally related to their economic activities. The rubber slump at the beginning of the twentieth century, the end of the de facto autonomy of their kingdoms not long after, and the displacement of Ovimbundu traders by the Portuguese forced these people to turn to cash-crop agriculture. (The men had hitherto had little involvement with cultivation; in fact, the women continued to be responsible for the cultivation of subsistence crops.)

The introduction of cash crops, particularly coffee, led to a series of changes in settlement patterns and social arrangements. But after a time, soil exhaustion, lack of support of African agriculture by the colonial authorities, incursions of Portuguese settlers who took over valuable property in the highlands, and a number of other factors contributed to a decline in the success of Ovimbundu cash-crop agriculture. By the early 1960s, up to 100,000 Ovimbundu, estimated at one-quarter of the group's able-bodied adult males, were migrating on one-year and two-year labor contracts to the coffee plantations of Uíge and Cuanza Norte provinces; another 15,000 to 20,000 sought work in Luanda and Lobito; and roughly the same number worked in the industrial plants of Huambo or for European farmers in the Benguela Plateau. In most cases, remuneration was low, but these migrant workers had little alternative. This pattern continued through the remainder of the colonial period, except for those males who were involved in nationalist activity (usually with UNITA).

In the 1940s, the Ovimbundu organized what was probably the most closely knit Angolan community of the colonial era. With the financial and ideological aid of North American Christian missionaries, they established a network of Christian villages, each with its own leadership, schools, churches, and clinics. They were thus able to maintain the Ovimbundu culture while providing educational and social amenities for their children. The generation that emerged from this structure became the disciples of Jonas Savimbi and the basis for UNITA, which in the 1980s used the same concepts to maintain Ovimbundu cohesiveness within UNITA-controlled areas.

Given the degree of change in Ovimbundu society and the involvement of the Ovimbundu with UNITA, it was difficult to determine their long-range role in Angolan politics. Just how long Ovimbundu solidarity would persist under changing circumstances could not be predicted.

=== Ambundu ===
Just north of Ovimbundu territory lived the Mbundu, the second largest ethnolinguistic category, whose language was Kimbundu. In 1988 they made up an estimated 25 percent of the Angolan population. In the sixteenth century, most of the groups that came to be known as Mbundu (a name apparently first applied by the neighboring Bakongo) lived well to the east of the coast in the plateau region (at a somewhat lower altitude than the Ovimbundu); a few groups in the far northeast lived at altitudes below 700 meters. In general, the outlines of the area occupied by the Mbundu had remained the same. The major exception was their expansion of this area to parts of the coast formerly occupied by Bakongo and others.

Although most of the boundaries of Mbundu territory remained fairly firm, the social and linguistic boundaries of the category had shifted, some of the peripheral groups having been variably influenced by neighboring groups and the groups close to the coast having been more strongly influenced by the Portuguese than were the more remote ones. Moreover, the subdivisions discernible for the sixteenth century (and perhaps earlier) also changed in response to a variety of social and linguistic influences in the colonial period. The Mbundu in general and the western Mbundu in particular, located as they were not far from Luanda, were susceptible to those influences for a longer time and in a more intense way than were other Angolan groups.

There were a number of Kimbundu dialects and groups. Two, each incorporating Portuguese terms, gradually became dominant, serving as lingua francas for many Mbundu. The western dialect was centered in Luanda, to which many Mbundu had migrated over the years. The people speaking it, largely urban, had come to call themselves Ambundu or Akwaluanda, thus distinguishing themselves from rural Mbundu. The eastern dialect, known as Ambakista, had its origins in the eighteenth century in a mixed Portuguese-Mbundu trading center at Ambaca near the western edge of the plateau region, but it spread in the nineteenth century through much of eastern Mbundu territory. Another Kimbundu-speaking group, the Dembos, were generally included in the Mbundu category. Living north of Luanda, they had also been strongly influenced by Kikongo speakers.

By the late 1960s, the Mbundu living in the cities, such as Luanda and Malanje, had adopted attributes of Portuguese lifestyle . Many had intermarried with Portuguese, which led to the creation of an entirely new class of mestiços. Those who received formal education and fully adopted Portuguese customs became assimilados.

The Mbundu were the MPLA's strongest supporters when the movement first formed in 1956. The MPLA's president, Agostinho Neto, was the son of a Mbundu Methodist pastor and a graduate of a Portuguese medical school. In the 1980s, the Mbundu were predominant in Luanda, Bengo, Cuanza Norte, Malanje, and northern Cuanza Sul provinces.

=== Bakongo ===
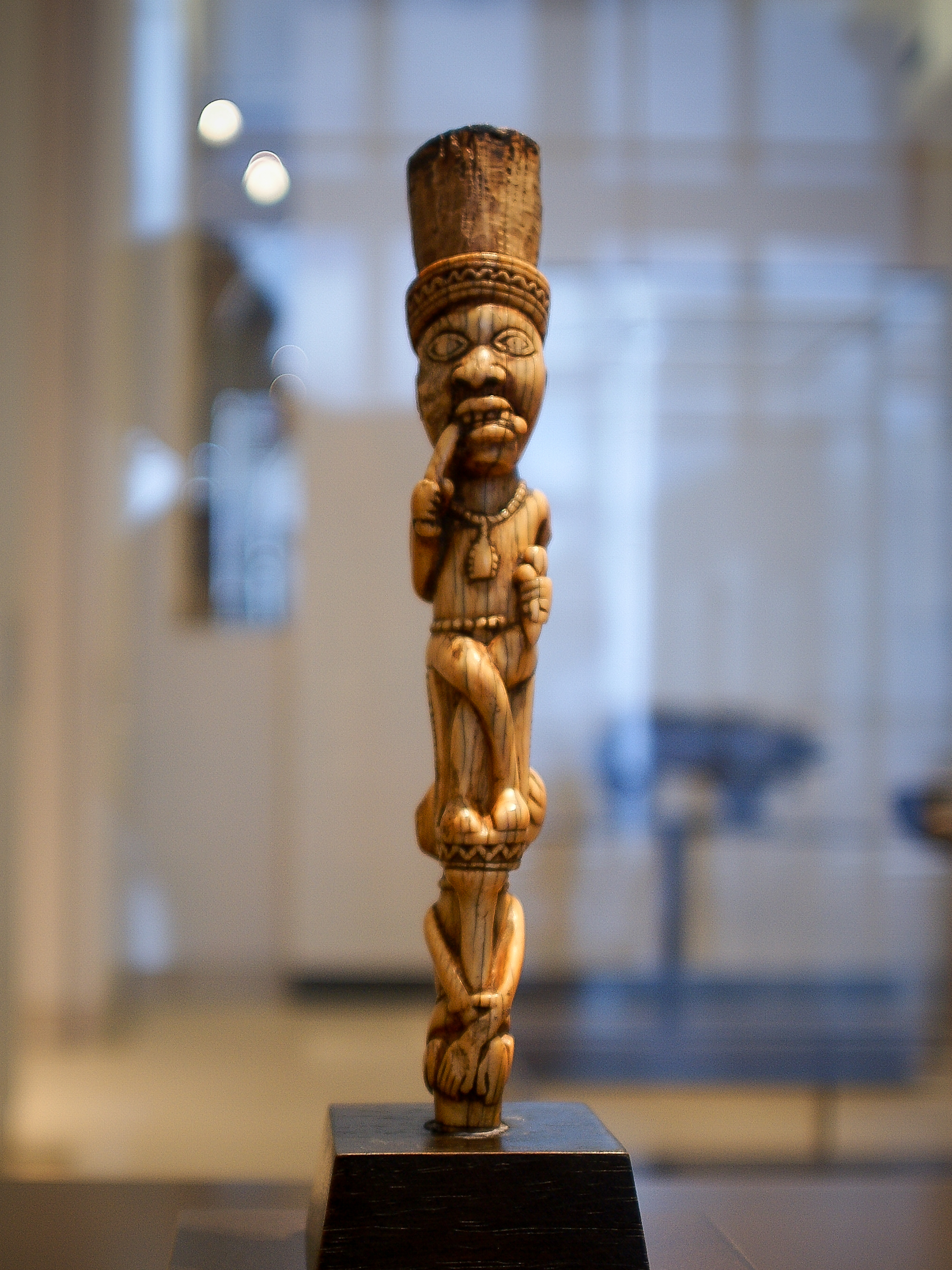
Yombe-sculpture, 19th century

The Kikongo-speaking Bakongo made up an estimated 15 percent of the Angolan population. In 1988 the Bakongo were the third largest ethnolinguistic group in Angola. Concentrated in Uíge, Zaire, and Cabinda provinces, where they constituted a majority of the population, the Bakongo spilled over into the nation of the Democratic Republic of the Congo (where they were the largest single ethnic group) and Congo. Although the Angolan city of São Salvador (renamed Mbanza Congo) was the capital of their ancient kingdom, most of the Bakongo were situated in Zaire.

Their former political unity long broken, the various segments of the ethnolinguistic category in Angola experienced quite different influences in the colonial period. The Bashikongo, living near the coast, had the most sustained interaction with the Portuguese but were less affected by participation in the coffee economy than the Sosso and Pombo, who were situated farther east and south. All three groups, however, were involved in the uprising of 1961. The Pombo, still farther east but close to the Zairian border, were much influenced by developments in the Belgian Congo (present-day DR Congo), and a large contingent of Pombo living in Léopoldville (present-day Kinshasa) formed a political party in the early 1950s. The Solongo, dwelling on the relatively dry coastal plain, had little contact with the Portuguese. They and the Ashiluanda of the island of Luanda, to the south, were Angola's only African sea fishermen.

The Mayombe (also spelled Maiombe) of the mountain forests of Cabinda spoke a dialect of Kikongo but were not part of the ancient kingdom. That part of the Mayombe living in Zaire did join with the Zairian Bakongo in the Alliance of Bakongo (Alliance des Bakongo – Abako) during the period of party formation in the Belgian Congo, but the Cabindan Mayombe (and other Kikongo-speaking groups in the enclave), relatively remote geographically and culturally from the Bakongo of Angola proper, showed no solidarity with the latter. Instead, in 1961 the Mayombe formed a Cabindan separatist movement, the Alliance of Mayombe (Alliance de Mayombe – Alliama), which merged with two other Cabindan separatist movements in 1963 to form the Front for the Liberation of the Enclave of Cabinda (Frente para a Libertação do Enclave de Cabinda – FLEC).

One of the first major revolts of the nationalist struggle was instigated by Bakongo in March 1961 in the northwest. The Portuguese crushed the peasant attack, organized by the Bakongo group, the Union of Angolan Peoples (União das Populações de Angola – UPA), on their settlements, farms, and administrative outposts. Subsequently, 400,000 Bakongo fled into Zaire. In 1962 the UPA formed the National Front for the Liberation of Angola (Frente Nacional de Libertação de Angola – FNLA), which became one of the three major nationalist groups (the other two being the MPLA and UNITA) involved in the long and bloody war of independence. Most of the FNLA's traditional Bakongo constituency fled into exile in Zaire during the war. Following independence, however, many Bakongo exiles returned to their traditional homesteads in Angola. They had since retained their ethnolinguistic integrity.

The Bakongo are a matriarchal tribe, which means that the women have the authority and power in the tribe.

=== Lunda-Chokwe ===
The hyphenated category Lunda-Chokwe constituted an estimated 8 percent of the Angolan population in 1988. As the hyphenation implies, the category comprises at least two subsets, the origins of which are known to be different and the events leading to their inclusion in a single set are recent. The Lunda alone were a congeries of peoples brought together in the far-flung Lunda Empire (seventeenth century to nineteenth century) under the hegemony of a people calling themselves Ruund, its capital in the eastern section of Zaire's Katanga Province (present-day Shaba Province). Lunda is the form of the name used for the Ruund and for themselves by adjacent peoples to the south who came under Ruund domination. In some sources, the Ruund are called Northern Lunda, and their neighbors are called Southern Lunda. The most significant element of the latter, called Ndembu (or Ndembo), lived in Zaire and Zambia. In Angola the people with whom the northward-expanding Chokwe came into contact were chiefly Ruund speakers. The economic and political decline of the empire by the second half of the nineteenth century and the demarcation of colonial boundaries ended Ruund political domination over those elements beyond the Zairian borders.

The Chokwe, until the latter half of the nineteenth century a small group of hunters and traders living near the headwaters of the Cuango and Cassai rivers, were at the southern periphery of the Lunda Empire and paid tribute to its head. In the latter half of the nineteenth century, the Chokwe became increasingly involved in trading and raiding, and they expanded in all directions, but chiefly to the north, in part absorbing the Ruund and other peoples. In the late nineteenth century, the Chokwe went so far as to invade the capital of the much-weakened empire in Katanga. As a consequence of this Chokwe activity, a mixed population emerged in parts of Zaire as well as in Angola, although there were virtually homogenous communities in both countries consisting of Chokwe, Ruund, or Southern Lunda.

The intermingling of Lunda (Ruund and Southern Lunda) and Chokwe, in which other smaller groups were presumably also caught up, continued until about 1920. It was only after that time that the mixture acquired the hyphenated label and its members began to think of themselves (in some contexts) as one people.

The languages spoken by the various elements of the so-called Lunda-Chokwe were more closely related to each other than to other Bantu languages in the Zairian-Angolan savanna but were by no means mutually intelligible. The three major tongues (Ruund, Lunda, and Chokwe) had long been distinct from each other, although some borrowing of words, particularly of Ruund political titles by the others, had occurred.

Portuguese anthropologists and some others accepting their work have placed some of the peoples (Minungu and Shinji) in this area with the Mbundu, and the Minungu language is sometimes considered a transitional one between Kimbundu and Chokwe. There may in fact have been important Mbundu influence on these two peoples, but the work of a number of linguists places their languages firmly with the set that includes Ruund, Lunda, and Chokwe.

Economic and political developments in the 1970s affected various sections of the Lunda-Chokwe differently. Substantial numbers of them live in or near Lunda Norte Province, which contains the principal diamond mines of Angola. Diamond mining had been significant since 1920, and preindependence data show that the industry employed about 18,000 persons. Moreover, the mining company provided medical and educational facilities for its employees and their dependents, thereby affecting even greater numbers. How many of those employed were Lunda-Chokwe is not clear, although neighboring villages would have been affected by the presence of the mining complex in any case. In the intra-Angolan political conflict preceding and immediately following independence, there apparently was some division between the northern Lunda-Chokwe, especially those with some urban experience, who tended to support the MPLA, and the rural Chokwe, particularly those farther south, who tended to support UNITA. In the 1980s, as the UNITA insurgency intensified in the border areas of eastern and northern Angola, Lunda-Chokwe families were forced to flee into Zaire's Shaba Province, where many remained in 1988, living in three sites along the Benguela Railway. The impact of this move on the ethnolinguistic integrity of these people was not known.

A somewhat different kind of political impact began in the late 1960s, when refugees from Katanga in Zaire, speakers of Lunda or a related language, crossed the border into what are now Lunda Sul and northern Moxico provinces. In 1977 and 1978, these refugees and others whom they had recruited formed the National Front for the Liberation of the Congo (Front National pour la Libération du Congo – FNLC) and used the area as a base from which they launched their invasions of Shaba Province. In the 1980s, these rebels and perhaps still other refugees remained in Angola, many in Lunda Sul Province, although the Angolan government as part of its rapprochement with Zaire was encouraging them to return to their traditional homes. The Zairian government offered amnesty to political exiles on several occasions in the late 1980s and conferred with the Angolan government on the issue of refugees. In 1988, however, a significant number of Zairian refugees continued to inhabit LundaChokwe territory. The significance for local Lunda-Chokwe of the presence and activities of these Zairians was not known.

=== Ganguela ===
Ganguela is generic term for a number of closely related Bantu languages in south-eastern Angola spoken by the Ngonzelo, Luchazi, Nyemba, Luvale, Luimbi, Mbunda, Mbuela, Yauma and Nkangala ethnic groups. Yauma language and Nkangala language are in turn Mbunda dialects. Nkangala, Mbalango, Sango, Ciyengele (Shamuka) and Ndundu are closely related.

=== Ovambo, Nyaneka-Nkhumbi, Herero, and others ===
In far southwestern Angola, three categories of Bantu-speaking peoples have been distinguished. Two of them, the Ovambo and the Herero, were more heavily represented elsewhere: the Ovambo in Namibia and the Herero in Namibia and Botswana. The Herero dispersion, especially that section of it in Botswana, was the consequence of the migration of the Herero from German South West Africa (present-day Namibia) after their rebellion against German rule in 1906. The third group was the Nyaneka-Humbe. Unlike the other groups, the Nyaneka-Humbe did not disperse outside Angola. In 1988 the Nyaneka-Humbe (the first group is also spelled Haneca; the latter group is also spelled Nkumbi) constituted 3 percent of the population. The Ovambo, of which the largest subgroup were the Kwanhama (also spelled Kwanyama), made up an estimated 2 percent of the Angolan population. In the second half of the nineteenth century, the Kwanhama Kingdom of southern Angola was a powerful state involved in a lucrative trade relationship with the Portuguese, who, together with the Germans, occupied Kwanhama territory in the early twentieth century. In the 1980s, the Ovambo were seminomadic cattle herders and farmers. The Herero constituted no more than 0.5 percent of the population in 1988. Traditionally, the Herero were nomadic or seminomadic herders living in the arid coastal lowlands and in the mountainous escarpment to the east in Namibe, Benguela, and Huíla provinces. Many Herero migrated south to Namibia when the Portuguese launched a military expedition against them in 1940 following their refusal to pay taxes.

In the southeastern corner of the country the Portuguese distinguished a set of Bantu-speaking people, described on a map prepared by José Redinha in 1973 as the Xindonga. The sole linguistic group listed in this category was the Cussu. The Language Map of Africa, prepared under the direction of David Dalby for the International African Institute, noted two sets of related languages in southeastern Angola. The first set included Liyuwa, Mashi, and North Mbukushu. These languages and other members of the set were also found in Zambia and Namibia. The members of the second set, Kwangali-Gcikuru and South Mbukushu, were also found in Namibia and Botswana. The hyphen between Kwangali and Gcikuru implies mutual intelligibility. Little is known of these groups; in any case, their members were very few.

All of these southern Angolan groups relied in part or in whole on cattle raising for subsistence. Formerly, the Herero were exclusively herders, but they gradually came to engage in some cultivation. Although the Ovambo had depended in part on cultivation for a much longer time, dairy products had been an important source of subsistence, and cattle were the chief measure of wealth and prestige.

The southwestern groups, despite their remoteness from the major centers of white influence during most of the colonial period, were to varying degrees affected by the colonial presence and, after World War II, by the arrival of numbers of Portuguese in such places as Moçâmedes (present-day Namibe) and Sá da Bandeira (present-day Lubango). The greatest resistance to the Portuguese was offered by the Ovambo, who were not made fully subject to colonial rule until 1915 and who earned a considerable reputation among the Portuguese and other Africans for their efforts to maintain their independence. In the nationalist struggle of the 1960s and early 1970s and in the postindependence civil war, the Ovambo tended to align themselves with the Ovimbundu-dominated UNITA. Many also sympathized with the cause of SWAPO, a mostly Ovambo organization fighting to liberate Namibia from South African rule.

=== Hunters, gatherers, herders, and others ===
Throughout the lower third of Angola, chiefly in the drier areas, were small bands of people. Until the twentieth century, most of them were nomadic hunters and gatherers, although some engaged in herding, either in addition to their other subsistence activities or as their chief means of livelihood. Those who survived turned, at least in part, to cultivation.

The bands living a nomadic or seminomadic life in Cuando Cubango Province (and occasionally reaching as far east as the upper Cunene River) differed physically and linguistically from their sedentary Bantu-speaking neighbors. Short, saffron-colored, and in other respects physically unlike the Nganguela, Ovambo, and Nyaneka-Humbe, they spoke a language of the !Xu-Angola or Maligo set of tongues referred to as Khoisan or Click languages (the exclamation point denotes a specific kind of click), whose precise relations to each other are not yet fully understood by observers.

Several other hunting and gathering or herding groups, the members of which were taller and otherwise physically more like the local Bantu speakers, lived farther west, adjacent to the Ovambo and Herero. These people spoke Bantu languages and were less nomadic than the Khoisan speakers, but they were clearly different from the Ovambo and Herero and probably preceded them in the area. As with most African art, the wooden masks and sculptures of Angola are not merely aesthetic creations. They play an important role in cultural rituals, representing life and death, the passage from childhood to adulthood, the celebration of a new harvest and the marking of the hunting season. Angolan artisans work in wood, bronze, ivory, malachite or ceramic mediums. Each ethno-linguistic group in Angola has its own unique artistic traits. Perhaps the single most famous piece of Angolan art is the Cokwe thinker, a masterpiece of harmony and symmetry of line. The Lunda-Cokwe in the north eastern part of Angola is also known for its superior plastic arts.

Other signature pieces of Angolan art include the female mask Mwnaa-Pwo worn by male dancers in their puberty rituals, the polychromatic Kalelwa masks used during circumcision ceremonies, Cikungu and Cihongo masks which conjure up the images of the Lunda-Cokwe mythology (two key figures in this pantheon are princess Lweji and the civilizing prince Tschibinda-Ilunga), and the black ceramic art of Moxico of central/eastern Angola.

=== Mestiço ===
In 1960 a little more than 1 percent of the total population of Angola consisted of mestiços. It has been estimated that by 1970 these people constituted perhaps 2 percent of the population. Some mestiços left at independence, but the departure of much greater numbers of Portuguese probably resulted in an increase in the proportion of mestiços in the Angolan total. In 1988 mestiços probably continued to number about 2 percent of the Angolan population.

The process of mixing started very early and continued until independence. But it was not until about 1900, when the number of Portuguese in Angola was very small and consisted almost entirely of males, that the percentage of mestiços in the population exceeded the percentage of whites.

After a number of generations, the antecedents of many mestiços became mixed to the extent that the Portuguese felt a need to establish a set of distinctions among them. Many mestiços accepted this system as a means of social ranking. One source suggests that the term mestiço used alone in a social context applied specifically to the offspring of a mulatto and a white; the term mestiço cabrito referred to the descendant of a union between two mulattos; and the term mestico cafuso was applied to the child of a union between a mulatto and a black African. It is possible that an even more complex set of distinctions was sometimes used.

Most mestiços were urban dwellers and had learned to speak Portuguese either as a household language or in school. Although some of the relatively few rural mestiços lived like the Africans among whom they dwelt, most apparently achieved the status of assimilados, the term applied before 1961 to those nonwhites who fulfilled certain specific requirements and were therefore registered as Portuguese citizens.

With some exceptions, mestiços tended to identify with Portuguese culture, and their strongly voiced opposition over the years to the conditions imposed by the colonial regime stressed their rights to a status equivalent to that of whites. Before World War II, only occasionally did mestiço intellectuals raise their voices on behalf of the African population. Thus, despite the involvement of mestiços in the nationalist struggle beginning in 1961 and their very important role in the upper echelons of the government and party, significant segments of the African population tended to resent them. This legacy continued in the late 1980s because mestiços dominated the MPLA-PT hierarchy.

Starting in the late 1970s, an average of 50,000 Cuban troops and civilian technical personnel (the overwhelming majority of whom were male) were stationed in Angola. As a result, a portion of the nation's younger population was undoubtedly of mixed African and Cuban descent. This new category of racial mixture, however, had not been described by researchers as of late 1988, and no figures existed on how many Angolans might fall into this category.

== Bibliography ==
- Coppé, Margrit and Fergus Power (eds.) (2002) Stories for trees: stories and images of Angola. Luanda: Development Workshop.
- Estermann, Carlos (1976–1981) The Ethnography of Southwestern Angola (edited by Gordon D. Gibson). New York: Africana Publishing Company. (translation of Etnografia do suoeste de Angola, 1956–1961)
- Fernando, Manzambi Vuvu (2001) 'Estudo das colecções etnográficas dos museus de Angola numa perspectiva histórica e antropológica', Africana Studia, 4, 121–147.
- Lopes, Carlos (1989) Éducation, science, culture et communication en Angola, Cap-Vert, Guinée Bissau, Mozambique et São Tomé et Principe. Paris: UNESCO.
- Samuels, Michael Anthony (1970) Education in Angola, 1878-1914: a history of culture transfer and administration. New York: Teachers College Press.
- Fernandes, João and Ntondo, Zavoni (2002) "Angola: Povos e Línguas". Luanda: Nzila
