= 1900s in Angola =

Angola-related events during the 1900's

This article covers the period of 1900 to 1909, not Angola in the 20th century

In the 1900s in Angola the colonial economy expanded despite domestic unrest.

== Economy ==
In 1900, António de Sousa Lara, the company "Ferreira Marques & Fonseca" of João Ferreira Gonçalves - a noted capitalist, and financier, Commander of the Order of Christ, owner of Horta-Seca Palace in Lisbon - and the Bensaúde firm created the Commercial Company of Angola (Companhia Comercial de Angola). Lara and Ferreira Gonçalves established his first sugar mill in 1901, expanding his sugar-cane plantations in Benguela to 1,000 acres (4 km^{2}) of land in 1915. He employed a thousand workers and produced 2,500,000 pounds of sugar annually. He used the profits from his initial investment to build a railroad to his personal port. The CCA became the largest trading company in the Angolan colony.

In 1901, the Portuguese government imposed a quota of 6,000 tons of sugar production per year on Angola and Mozambique.

== Slavery and conquest ==
The price of rubber declined in the 1900s, prompting a revolt in 1902. The uprising, the last attempt by the Ovimbundu peoples to resist Portuguese colonization, pitted rival traders against one another. However, while the Portuguese maintained ethnic and national solidarity, the Ovimbundu continued to engage in slave raids. The Portuguese suppressed the rebellion and annexed the Central Highlands. Degredado settlers and Boer farmers stole natives' lands, impressing and deporting workers to plantations. Portuguese authorities arrested the king of Bailundo after an Ovimbundu celebration in which natives consumed Portuguese rum, allegedly without paying. The king's advisor, Mutu ya Kevela, allied with Bailundo's neighboring kingdoms and launched a liberation war. He told his council, rallying them to fight, "Before the traders came we had our own home-brewed beer, we lived long lives and were strong." Kevela's troops killed Portuguese colonists and burned down their trading posts. Native victories spread towards Bié, but Portuguese troops stationed in Benguela and Moçâmedes put down the revolt. The war ended in 1903, almost two years later, with the Portuguese victorious and Kevela dead.

Thomas Fowell Buxton, at the time a member (and later President) of the Aborigines' Protection Society, wrote to Portugal's representatives in the United Kingdom in December 1902, inquiring about the state and extent of slavery in Angola. The Portuguese government replied to his letter in February 1903, denying the existence of slavery its colonies and deriding the "imagination of certain philanthropists."

In 1904, the Kwanyama Ovambo defeated the Portuguese, eradicating the Portuguese force with assistance from German-run South-West Africa which wanted to wrest control of Angola from the Portuguese. In 1905 the population grew to just under 11,000. The population of Boer and Madeiran colonists in Lubango grew to 2,000 in 1904.

In 1914, the Mbunda waged an armed campaign in southeastern Angola to resist Portuguese colonial occupation.

== Colonial governors ==
1. Francisco Xavier Cabral de Oliveira Moncada, Governor-General of Angola (1900–1903)
2. Eduardo Augusto Ferreira da Costa, Governor-General of Angola (1903–1904)
3. Custódio Miguel de Borja, Governor-General of Angola (1904)
4. António Duarte Ramada Curto, Governor-General of Angola (1904–1905)
5. Eduardo Augusto Ferreira da Costa, Governor-General of Angola (1906–1907)
6. Henrique Mitchell de Paiva, Governor-General of Angola (1907–1909)
7. Álvaro António da Costa Ferreira, Governor-General of Angola (1909)
8. José Augusto Alves Roçadas, Governor-General of Angola (1909–1910)

== See also ==
- History of Portugal (1834–1910)
- Portuguese West Africa
