= Mercado Roque Santeiro =

The Mercado Roque Santeiro (Portuguese: Roque Santeiro Market) was an open-air marketplace in the district of Sambizanga, in the city of Luanda, the capital of Angola. It opened in 1991 with the official name of Mercado Popular da Boavista; it was named Roque Santeiro after the Brazilian telenovela of same name, aired at the time on Angolan television.

Roque Santeiro became known as the largest market in Africa, spreading through a 1 kilometer length by 500 m width area (the equivalent area of 500 soccer fields) where marketers sold various kinds of goods, from food to computers, in tin-roofed stalls. The market thrived with the civilian conflicts in Angola; with the shortage of food and other goods, Roque Santeiro was one of the few places where they could be found. It was also known as a place for illicit activities such as drug and arms dealing.

Mercado Roque Santeiro was shut down by municipal government in 2011; the marketers were transferred to a new location, in Panguila.
