= Ekuikui IV =

Angola royal and politician (c. 1913–2012)

Augusto Cachitiopolo, known by the royal title of Ekuikui IV, (c. 1913 – January 14, 2012) was an Angolan royal and politician, who served as the King of Bailundo in Huambo Province. Politically, Cachitiopolo served as a member of the National Assembly of Angola and a member of the MPLA's central committee.

King Ekuikui IV died from an illness on January 14, 2012, at the age of 98.
