= Avenida Comandante Valódia =

Coordinates: 8°49′4.9″S 13°14′48.7″E

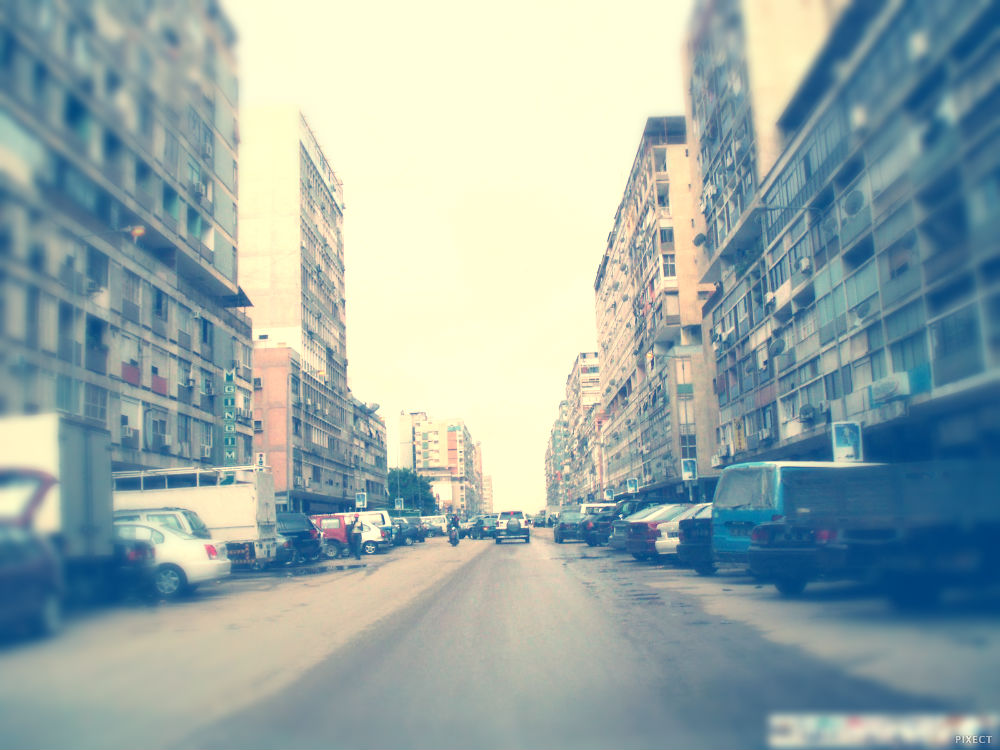
Avenida Comandante Valódia in 2005

Avenida Comandante Valódia also known as Bairro dos Combatentes is a residential area neighborhood in Luanda's central municipality of Sambizanga in Luanda province of Angola, and is centered on a busy interchange. It is 1.61 km long, has about 144,000 inhabitants and is split in both ways. It is bordered to the west by Kinaxixi, on the north by Marçal, in the east by São Paulo, and south by Avenida Brasil. It has the following coordinates: Latitude: -8°49'5.88" and Longitude: 13°14'51.36. The neighborhood is known for its office and residential buildings, and is also home to the famous Hotel Trópico, the renowned 147 public school and the now defunct market Feira Ngoma.

== Name ==
According to Angolan historian Paulo Azevedo, the name of the neighborhood was given by the Angolan government in honour of a lieutenant in the Angolan army named Valódia who was one of the prominent commanders during the Angolan War of Independence.

== History ==
=== Early history and development ===
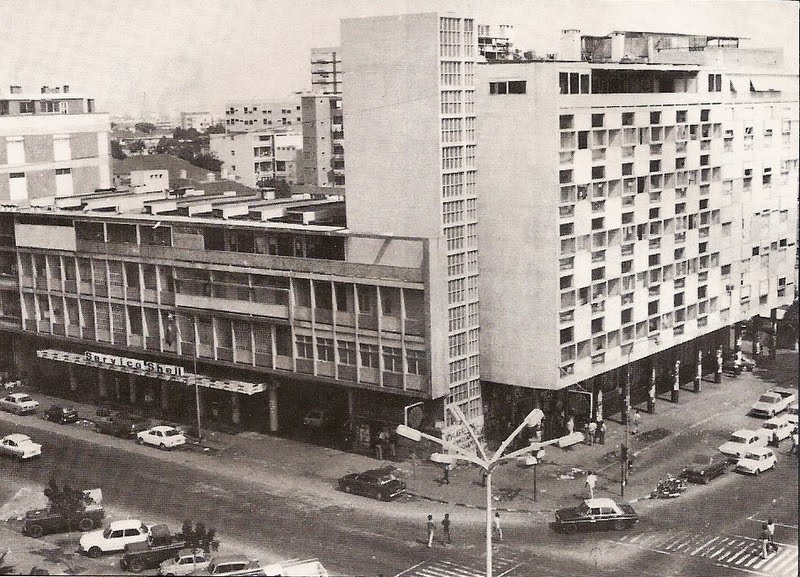
Avenida Comandante Valódia in 1970

Originally named Bairro dos Combatantes da Primeira Guerra Mundial, the neighborhood was founded by the Portuguese government in 1970 during the colonial period to support the families of the Portuguese colonial army during the Angolan War of Independence. When Angola regained independence from Portugal in 1975, it was renamed, and the population at the time comprised only people of Caucasian race with only a handful of people of different races that inhabited this residential area. As the war for independence started to reach its end, fearing reprisal from the native population, the Portuguese contingent started to flee and only 5% remained of the total population with Portuguese ancestry.

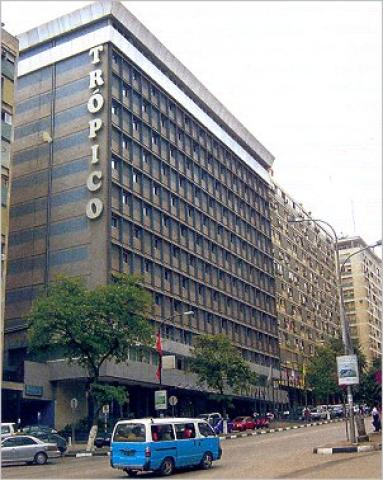
Hotel Trópico in downtown Avenida Comandante Valódia

After a redevelopment in the late 1980s, Avenida Comandante Valódia became one of the busiest parts of the Sambizanga municipality.

== Economy ==
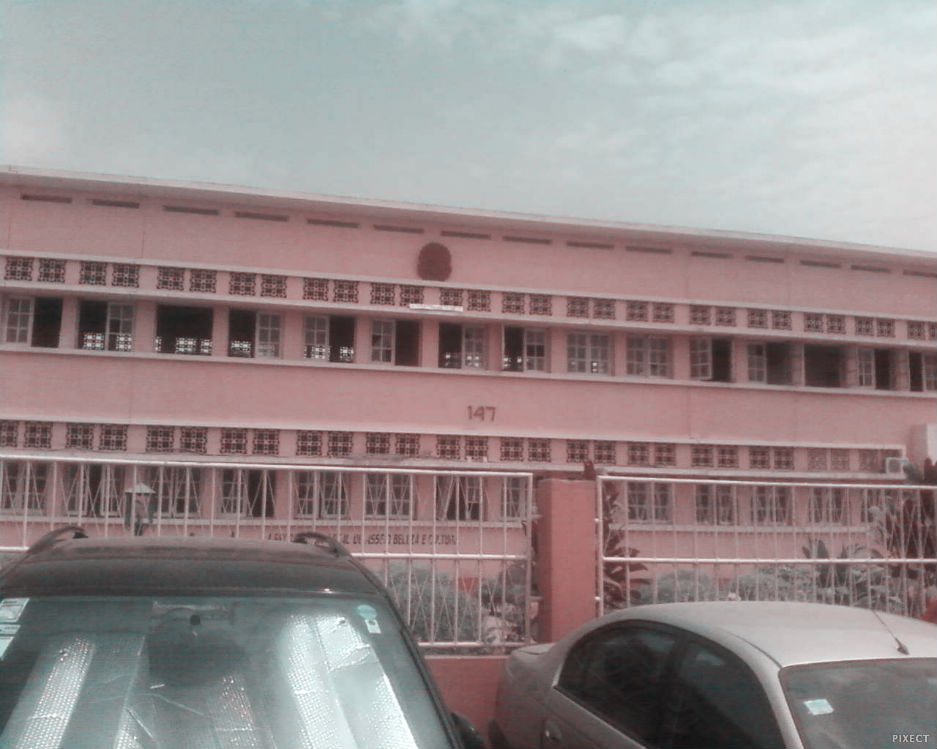
147 Public school in Avenida Comandante Valódia

Just across Kinaxixi in downtown Avenida Comandante Valódia, is located the famous Trópico Hotel. Funded in 1997 the hotel has been a source of income for the area attracting an estimated 1.1 million people from expats from around the world as well as locals searching for a place to stay in Luanda. The area is home to many restaurants, business offices, and banks who also contribute to national wealth of Angola.

== Education ==
There are numerous public and private schools also known as colégios in Avenida Comandante Valódia, Public schools include: 147 also known as Cento e quarenta e sete, Pascoal Luvualu and 132, all being K-12 (12-year) schools. Private schools in the area include: Colégio Santa Teresinha, Colégio Pitabel and 2-ÁS.
