= Portuguese conquest of Viye =

Conquest of Viye
- Part of Campaigns of Pacification and Occupation
Date	30 October – 4 December 1890
Location	Bié, Angola
Result	Portuguese victory
Territorial changes	Annexation of Viye by Portugal

Belligerents
Kingdom of Portugal	Kingdom of Viye

Commanders and leaders
Artur de Paiva	Dunduma (POW)

Strength
591 combatants	2000 warriors

The Portuguese Conquest of the Kingdom of Viye (Bié in Portuguese) was a military operation in 1890 and it was part of the Portuguese Campaigns of Pacification and Occupation that resulted in the formation of modern-day Angola.

== History ==
Portugal had been present in Angola ever since Paulo Dias de Novais founded Luanda in 1576, although Portuguese merchants and missionaries had already been in the territory for some time before that.

After the independence of Brazil, the Portuguese government decided to develop its remaining territories in Africa and pacify or occupy any hostile native powers. In the mid-19th century however, other European powers began to scramble for Africa, and the Berlin Conference imposed the principle of effective occupation of the territory, thereby rejecting Portugal's claims based on discovery.

In the Central Plateau of Angola, army officers Paiva Couceiro and Teixeira da Silva camped with a number of troops in Belmonte (now Cuíto), a settlement founded by Silva Porto, on their way to Barotse, which displeased the chief of Bié, Cikunyu, better known as Dunduma (‘Thunder’), who tolerated Portuguese traders such as Silva Porto in his kingdom but not the Portuguese military.

The five great Ovimbundo kingdoms, including Viye.

On 28 March 1890, Dunduma demanded that Paiva Couceiro and Teixeira da Silva leave his kingdom. The British missionary Frederick Stanley Arnot was in Kwanjulula in Viye at the time, and he was also instructed to leave the kingdom but he persuaded Dunduma to allow him and the British missionaries to say, which aroused the suspicion of the Portuguese however. The following day Silva Porto travelled to Ecovongo, the capital of Viye, 30 kilometres from Belmonte, to negotiate, but he was disrespected by the ruler. Humiliated, on the night of 30 to 31 March, Silva Porto committed suicide in his hut by blowing up an ammunition cache. Paiva Couceiro found the body of the frontiersman on 1 April, wrapped in a Portuguese flag.

The death of Silva Porto outraged Portuguese society and prompted the Portuguese government to organize three new military expeditions to the Central Plateau. One of these was the expedition led by Paiva Couceiro, who explored the Cubango River until October 1890 and distributed Portuguese flags among African lords and rulers who accepted Portuguese sovereignty as far as Mucusso, anticipating the magnate Cecil Rhodes of the British South Africa Company, who disputed the territory. Another was the conquest of Viye, which was to be carried out by Artur de Paiva with 591 combatants, 218 of whom were Boer mercenaries, 2 machine guns and 4 cannon.

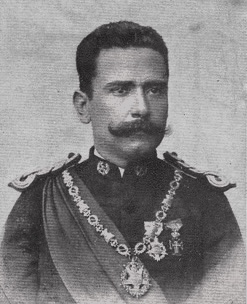
Artur de Paiva

Artur de Paiva gathered troops, animals, carts and supplies in Huíla until his column left for Viye on 8 August. On the morning of 30 October, the Paivas column crossed the Cutato River and entered Viye. Ecovongo was razed on 4 November 1890 and, on 4 December of the following month, Dunduma was captured and exiled to Cape Verde. Arnot was instrumental in arranging an armistice between Dunduma and Paiva, that prevented further loss of live and put an end to the fighting. Fort Silva Porto was founded in Viye with a garrison of 100 soldiers and four cannons. the column left for Huíla on 22 December.

== See also ==
- Portuguese Angola
- Campaigns of Pacification and Occupation
