= Capital punishment in Angola =

Capital punishment in Angola was abolished by constitution in 1992. In 1977, the country carried out its last executions, which were of Nito Alves and many of his supporters, who were convicted of treason. The execution method in Angola was by firing squad. Angola signed the Second Optional Protocol to the International Covenant on Civil and Political Rights on September 24, 2013, and ratified it on October 2, 2019. Angola voted in favor of the UN moratorium on the death penalty in 2007, 2008, 2010, 2012, 2014, 2016, 2018, and most recently in 2020.
