= Rádio Nacional de Angola =

Programming
- Language: Portuguese

Ownership
- Owner: Government of Angola

History
- First air date: 1951

Links
- Website: https://rna.ao/

Rádio Nacional de Angola is a public broadcasting company of the Republic of Angola, headquartered in Luanda. RNA operates several radio stations in the capital, including Canal A (the national broadcaster), Rádio N'Gola Yetu (broadcasting in Angolan languages), Rádio Luanda (a local FM station for the capital), and Rádio 5 (a sports station); eighteen regional stations (one per province); and one international radio station (RNA Internacional).

Broadcasts are primarily in Portuguese, and the station also features programs in the country's national languages, namely: Kikongo, Kimbundu, Chokwe, Umbundu, Kwanyama, and Mbunda, as well as in Herero, Lingala, Nganguela, and Nyaneka. RNA's International Service is broadcast in Portuguese, English, and French.

== History ==
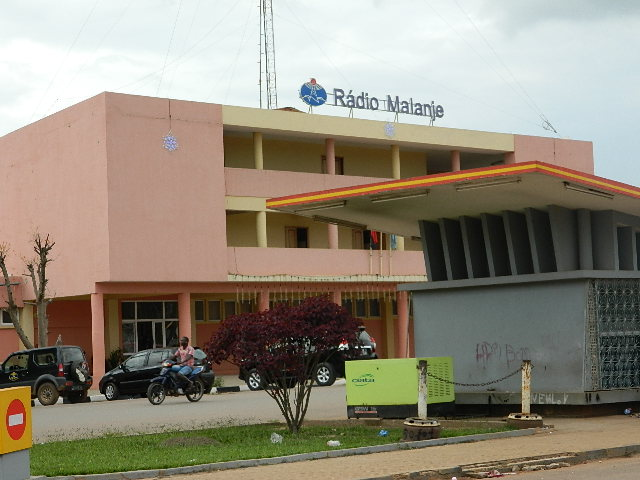
Headquarters of the RNA station in Malanje.

Broadcasting in Angola emerged in the 1930s from "radio club" experiments in various cities, the oldest being in Benguela, officially launched on February 28, 1933. Official colonial broadcasts were mainly carried out by Rádio Clube de Luanda. In 1951, the Ministry of Colonies authorized the creation of the Official Broadcasting Office (GRO), subordinate to the Posts, Telegraphs, and Telephones (CTT), with the aim of organizing government communication, although transmissions continued to be handled by private stations.

In 1953, daily experimental broadcasts of the Official Broadcasting Service of Angola (SORA), also known as Rádio Oficial de Angola, began. The service gained administrative and financial independence from the CTT, with its own staff and equipment. In 1955, it was renamed the National Broadcasting Station of Angola (Emissora Nacional de Radiodifusão de Angola), symbolizing a restructuring and the launch of a new programming schedule. Following reforms to the colonial broadcasting system, the station was placed directly under the Portuguese Secretary of State for Commerce and Tourism in 1963, later adopting the name Emissora Oficial de Angola (EOA), which it retained until 1975.

In parallel, during the struggle for independence, liberation movements created their own stations: the FNLA launched Voz Livre de Angola (1963) and the MPLA launched Rádio Angola Combatente (1965). The latter, with a larger structure and broadcasts in local languages from Congo-Brazzaville and Zambia, gained popularity and exerted strong anti-colonial influence. During the transition period (August–November 1975), RNA (still EOA) was the only public media outlet that remained under the control of the Transitional Government, while other media fell under FNLA control.

With the MPLA's capture of Luanda on November 11, 1975, President Agostinho Neto ordered the dissolution of all private radio stations and the integration of their structures into EOA, including Rádio Angola Combatente. The only station authorized to continue operating independently was Rádio Ecclesia. The state broadcaster, now with a vast array of equipment and personnel, was provisionally named "Emissora Nacional de Angola."

In 1977, the government promoted an extensive reorganization of the station, finally assigning it the name Rádio Nacional de Angola (RNA), consolidating it as the country's main public broadcasting company, a role it maintains to this day.
