= Kakonda =

Angolan Ovimbundu kingdom

Kakonda Ocilombo coñoma (Umbundu)
- Status: Kingdom
- Common languages: Umbundu

Kakonda (also known as Cilombo-coñoma, Ocilombo coñoma, Caconda, or Quilombo) was one of the traditional independent Ovimbundu kingdoms in Angola.
