= Sambizanga =

Sambizanga District in Northern Luanda
- Sambizanga
- Location within Angola Location within Africa
- Coordinates: 8°45′26″S 13°18′11″E
- Country: Angola
- Province: Luanda
- Municipality: City of Luanda

Area
  - Total: 145 km^{2} (56 sq mi)
- Elevation: 15 m (49 ft)

Population
  - Total: 244 000
  - Density: 16,828/km^{2} (43,580/sq mi)
- Time zone: UTC+1 (GMT)

Sambizanga is one of the six urban districts that make up the municipality of Luanda, in the province of Luanda, Angola.

== Overview ==
Sambizanga has a 14.5 km^{2} area and about 244,000 inhabitants. Limited to the west by the Atlantic Ocean, on the north by the municipality of Cacuaco, in the East by the municipality of Cazenga and south by the municipalities of Ingombota and Rangel. It comprises the municipalities of Sambizanga, Bairro Operário and Ngola Kiluanje. Sambizanga is home to the Progresso Associação do Sambizanga football club of the Girabola and the residential area Avenida Comandante Valódia.

Mercado Roque Santeiro and Mercado do São Paulo are the largest open-air markets in Africa located in the district. The first is no longer existent but the second one still exists.

== More about Sambizanga ==
Sambizanga is a district in the North of Luanda. Its name comes from the words samba and zanga from the Kimbundu language that can also be traced backed to a dance similar to capoeira called where people would fight and compete a lot hence its name. If not the most important, Sambizanga was one of the most important and iconic neighborhoods in Luanda. It matched the importance of Soweto in South Africa, Harare in Zimbabwe and lots of other historic places like the neighborhoods in Accra Ghana. Sambizanga was not only important in a cultural way but also in a strategic way for the revolutionary movements who wanted to fight against colonialism. It was in Sambizanga that they all started seen as it could harbour, transition and mobilize everything and everybody to create its own dynamic. It was also in Sambizanga that the first Cape-Verdean, São-Tomé and Congolese immigrants arrived. It was regarded as a "Bairro" that had a little bit of everything, and that was brought by its youth who was dedicated to sports, studies and music.

Angola’s second President José Eduardo dos Santos (in office from to 2017) was born in Sambizanga.

== 2007 shooting ==
In December 2007, film director Radical Ribeiro began shooting a film in Sambizanga. On 18 December, police mistook actors in Ribeiro's film, who were carrying unloaded firearms, as actual criminals and opened fire on them, killing two. Interior Minister Roberto Leal Monteiro said "We won't rest until police at all levels realise they are public servants."

== See also ==
- List of lighthouses in Angola
- Railway stations in Angola
