= Civula =

Ovimbundu kingdom in Angola

Civula (also known as Quibula) was one of the traditional independent Ovimbundu kingdoms in Angola.

== See also ==
- Cingolo
- Ciyaka
- Ekekete
- Kingdom of Ndulu
