= Kingdom of Ndulu =

Angolan kingdom

Ndulu (also known as Andulo, Ondulu or Ondura) was one of the traditional independent Ovimbundu kingdoms in Angola.

== See also ==
- Cingolo
- Civula
- Ciyaka
- Ekekete
