= Ekekete =

Angolan kingdom

Ekekete (also known as Quiquete) was one of the traditional independent Ovimbundu kingdoms in Angola.

== See also ==
- Cingolo
- Civula
- Ciyaka
- Kingdom of Ndulu
