= Citata =

Angolan Ovimbundu kingdom

Citata (also known as Quitata) was one of the traditional independent Ovimbundu kingdoms in Angola.
