= Ngalangi =

Traditional independent kingdom in Angola

Ngalangi (also known as Galangue) was one of the traditional independent Ovimbundu kingdoms in Angola.
