= Kalukembe =

Traditional independent Ovimbundu kingdoms in Angola

- Before 1740
- Status: Kingdom
- King
  - 1740 - ?: Nganda Kapembe
- History
  - Established: Before 1740

Kalukembe (also known as Caluquembe, Caluguembe, or Caluqueme) was one of the traditional independent Ovimbundu kingdoms in Angola.
