= Ciyaka =

Traditional kingdom in Angola

Ciyaka (also known as Quiyaca or Quiaca) was one of the traditional independent Ovimbundu kingdoms in Angola.

== See also ==
- Cingolo
- Civula
- Ekekete
- Kingdom of Ndulu
