= Ovimbundu =

Ethnic group in central-southern Angola

Ovimbundu Southern Mbundu
- Ethnic map of Angola Ovimbundu area

Total population
- 12,740,000

Regions with significant populations
- Angola; Portugal

Languages
- Umbundu, Portuguese

Religion
- Christianity, African traditional religions

Related ethnic groups
- Ambundu, Ovambo, Herero, and other Bantu peoples, Afro-Brazilians

Southern Mbundu
- Person: Ocimbundu
- People: Ovimbundu
- Language: Umbundu
- Country: Ovimbunduland

The Ovimbundu, also known as the Southern Mbundu, (Note: The term Southern Mbundu has also been used for the Ambundu living in the Southern part of the Ambundu region. Oliver and Atmore use it for those in the area where the Ndongo Kingdom developed. See R.Oliver and A. Atmore, Medieval Africa 1250-1800, Cambridge University Press, 2001, page 168) are a Bantu ethnic group who live on the Bié Plateau of central Angola and in the coastal strip west of these highlands. As the largest ethnic group in Angola, they make up 38 percent of the country's population. Overwhelmingly the Ovimbundu follow Christianity, mainly the Igreja Evangélica Congregacional de Angola (IECA), founded by American missionaries, and the Catholic Church. However, some still retain beliefs and practices from African traditional religions.

== History ==
=== Early history ===
The origins of the Ovimbundu are Bantu populations who drifted in from the North, over the last millennium, and formed local/regional groups which slowly became political units and foci of social identity: M'Balundu, Sele, Wambo, Bieno and others. They developed a sophisticated agriculture, completed by the breeding of small animals (chicken, goats, swine) as well as of a modicum of cows bought from the farmer-herders to the South (Nyaneka-Nkhumbi, Ovambo).

Incisive change came about when the Portuguese established a colonial bridgehead in Benguela, in the 16th century. Several of the small kingdoms recognized the advantage of caravan trade between Benguela and peoples of the East, in particular the Chokwe, the Luvale and the Mbunda, from whom they obtained wax, rubber, honey and ivory. Each trading caravan had a professional leader and diviner. Trade agreements that had linked the independent chiefdoms led to the development of regional specializations, including metalwork and cornmeal production. Slavery and the slave trade were also an integral part of Ovimbundu societies. Caravan trading declined with the suppression of the slave trade and, more importantly, the construction of the Benguela Railway in 1904, and came to an end shortly after 1910.

=== 20th century ===
In the following years, the Ovimbundu completely changed their economy to cash crop production of corn, sold to a rapidly increasing network of Portuguese traders. However, because of their demographic growth, and because significant portions of their lands were appropriated by Europeans for coffee, sisal and other plantations, many Ovimbundu started to work as paid labour, mainly on European plantations in their own region or in Northwest Angola, but also in Namibian mines.

The Ovimbundu are the main social basis of UNITA, an anti-colonial movement that fought against the Portuguese from 1966 to 1974, was an adversary of the rival movement MPLA during the Angolan Civil War of 1975 to 2002, and is at present an opposition political party. (Note: The founder and historical leader of UNITA, Jonas Savimbi, was an Ovimbundu of the Bieno group.)

During the Civil War the two major cities located in Umbundu territory, Huambo and Kuito, were to a large extent destroyed by the MPLA and UNITA respectively, as were a considerable number of villages and much infrastructure (roads, railways, bridges etc.). Many people died, and many others fled to cities either in their own area (Benguela, Lobito) or in distant areas (mainly Luanda and its surroundings, but also Lubango). During long periods parts of Umbundu territory were under UNITA control.

=== 21st century ===
Since 2002, considerable efforts at reconstruction have been made by the government, interested in national reconciliation, but to a large extent by the people themselves, by the churches and by a variety of NGOs. A significant proportion of the "internally displaced" Ovimbundu have returned to their places of origin, where traditional forms of social organization have often survived or then been reconstituted. However, larger or smaller Ovimbundu communities have remained in many cities outside their habitat, so that a significant part of this people is now scattered all over Angola.

In political terms, the Angolan parliamentary elections of 2008 reflected an important shift in Ovimbundu loyalty: while most of them had voted UNITA in the previous (1992) election, their majority now voted MPLA - because (after the death of Jonas Savimbi) UNITA had lost much of its credibility, but also because strengthening UNITA was seen as implying the risk of a renewal of armed violence.

== See also ==
- Battle of the Cunene
- Bailundo
- Cingolo
- Citata
- Civula
- Ciyaka
- Ekekete
- Kakonda
- Kalukembe
- Kingdom of Ndulu
- Ngalangi
- Sambu Kingdom
- Viye
- Wambu
