= Umbundu =

Bantu language

- South Mbundu
- Úmbúndú
- Native to: Angola
- Ethnicity: Ovimbundu
- Native speakers: 7,000,000 (2018)
- Language family: Niger–Congo?: Atlantic–Congo; Volta-Congo; Benue–Congo; Bantoid; Southern Bantoid; Bantu (Zone R); Umbundu

Official status
- Official language in: Angola (national)

Language codes
- ISO 639-2: umb
- ISO 639-3: umb
- Glottolog: umbu1257
- Guthrie code: R.11

Southern Mbundu
- Person: Ocimbundu
- People: Ovimbundu
- Language: Umbundu
- Country: Ovimbunduland

Umbundu, also known as Angolan, South Mbundu (autonym úmbúndú), one of many Bantu languages, is the most widely-spoken autochthonous language of Angola. Its speakers are known as Ovimbundu, an ethnic group that constitutes a third of Angola's population and whose homeland is the Central Highlands of Angola and the coastal region west of the highlands, including the cities of Benguela and Lobito. Because of recent internal migration, there are now also large communities in the capital, Luanda, and in its surrounding province, as well as in Lubango.

== Phonology ==
=== Consonants ===
Umbundu consonants
		Labial	Alveolar	Palatal	Velar	Glottal
Stop	plain	p	t	t͡ʃ	k	
Stop	prenasal.	ᵐb	ⁿd	ᶮd͡ʒ	ᵑɡ	
Fricative	voiceless	f	s			h
Fricative	voiced	v				
Nasal		m	n	ɲ	ŋ	
Approximant		w	l	j		

=== Vowels ===
Umbundu vowels
	Front		Central		Back	
	oral	nasal	oral	nasal	oral	nasal
Close	i	ĩ			u	ũ
Mid	e	ẽ			o	õ
Open			a	ã		

=== Tone ===
Umbundu has two tones: low and high. The first acute accent (á) in a word represents a high tone. The low tone is represented by a grave accent (à). Unmarked syllables carry the same tone as the preceding syllable.

== Sample words and phrases ==
- Welcome – Ukombe weya ("The guests have come")
- Hello – Wakolapo? (sg); Wakolipo? (pl)
- How are you? – Wakolapo? (sg); Wakolipo? (pl)
- I'm fine thanks, and you? – Ndakolapo ("I'm fine"); Twakolapo ("We're fine")
- What's your name? – Velye olonduko vene? (frm); Helye onduko yove? (inf)
- My name is... – Onduko yange ame...
- Where are you from? – Pi ofeka yove? ("Where is your country?")
- I'm from... – Ofeka yange... ("My country is...")
- Good morning – Utanya uwa
- Good afternoon – Ekumbi liwa
- Good evening – Uteke uwa
- Good night – Uteke uwa; Pekelapo ciwa ("Sleep well")
- Goodbye – Ndanda. ("I went")
- Do you speak English? – Ove ovangula inglese?
- Do you speak Umbundu? – Ove ovangula umbundu?
- Sorry – Ngecele (sg); Twecele (pl)
- Please – Ndinge ohenda. ("Give me pity")
- Thank you – Ndapandula (sg); Twapandula (pl)
- Reply – Lacimwe

== Sample text ==
Omanu vosi vacitiwa valipwa kwenda valisoka kovina vyosikwenda komoko. Ovo vakwete esunga kwenda, kwenda olondunge kwenje ovo vatêla okuliteywila kuvamwe kwenda vakwavo vesokolwilo lyocisola.

Translation: "All human beings are born free and equal in dignity and rights. They are endowed with reason and conscience and should act towards one another in a spirit of brotherhood." (Article 1 of the Universal Declaration of Human Rights)
