= List of political entities in the 9th century BC =

Political entities in the 10th century BC – Political entities in the 8th century BC – Political entities by century

This is a list of states or polities that existed in the 9th century BC.

== Sovereign states ==
Sovereign state	Years	Location
Ammon	1000–332 BC	Asia
Alba Longa	1200–753 BC	Europe
Anarta	1100–550 BC	India
Anga	1380–550 BC	India
Aram Damascus	12th century BC – 734 BC	Asia
Aramea	2300–700 BC	Asia
Arcadia	1000–743 BC	
Argolis	1200–379 BC	
Asmaka	1150–300 BC	
Assyria –	934–609 BC	
Athens	1556–355 BC	Europe
Avanti	900–322 BC	India
Ba	13th century – 311 BC	China
Babylonia	1155–689 BC	Near East
Bashan	1330–928 BC	
Bithynia	297–74 BC	
Bit-Istar	12th century – 710 BC	
Cai	980–447 BC	
Cao	1053–487 BC	
Caria	11th – 6th century BC	
Carthage	814–650 BC	
Chaldea	1100–539 BC	
Chavín culture	900–200 BC	
Chedi	1250–344 BC	
Chen	855–479 BC	
Chola	3rd century BC – 1279 AD	India
Corduene	800 BC – 653 AD	
Chorasmia	1290–180 BC	
Chorrera	1800–300 BC	
Chu	1030–223 BC	
Colchis	1300 BC – 2nd century AD	
Danda	1100–450 BC	
Dasarna	1150–600 BC	
Deng	1200–678 BC	
D'mt	c.980 – c.400 BC	Africa
Diauehi	1118–760 BC	
Dilmun	2600–675 BC, 1200–125 BC	
Donghu	1400–150 BC	China
Doris	1100–560 BC	
Drangiana	950–600 BC	
Eastern Guo	1046–767 BC	China
Edom	1200–125 BC	
Elam	2800–550 BC	
Elam	850–609 BC	
Epirus	1183–168 BC	
Eshnuna	2000–8th century BC	
Etruria	1200–550 BC	
Gandhara	1450–510 BC	
Gojoseon	2333–108 BC	Korea
Gumie	1046–480 BC	
Han	1046–764 BC	China
Huang	891–648 BC	
Iberia	1000–302 BC	
Illyria	2000–168 BC	
Ionia	1070–545 BC	
Israel	930s – 720s BC	
Jin	1042–376 BC	
Jiroft	3100–2200 BC	
Judah	930s – 586 BC	
Kalinga	1376–285 BC	
Kamboja	1450–195 BC	
Kasi	600–345 BC	
Kasmira	1250–322 BC	
Kekeya	1250 – c. 4th century BC	
Kikata	2000–1700 BC	
Kimpurusha	1000–325 BC	
Kirata	1350 – c. 300 BC	
Kosala	1300–266 BC	
Kuru	1376–285 BC	
Kush	1070 BC – 350	
Kỷ line	853–755 BC	
Lower Egypt	1070–664 BC	
Liburnia	11th century – 34 BC	
Locria	1250–386 BC	
Lu	856–256 BC	
Lucania	1000–356 BC	
Lullubi	2400–650 BC	
Lycia	1250–546 BC	
Lydia	1200–546 BC	
Madra	1350–350 BC	
Magadha	1200–600 BC	
Mannaea	1110–616 BC	
Magan	2200–550 BC	
Matsya	1250–318 BC	
Messenia	1300–724 BC	
Minaea	580–85 BC	
Moab	1300–400 BC	
Mysia	1320–301 BC	
Nairi	1190–890 BC	
Namar	2350–750 BC	
Nok	1000 BC – 300 AD	
Olmec	1400–400 BC	
Oenotria	1000–325 BC	
Oscans	1000–4th centuries BC	
Panchala	800–323 BC	
Pandya	1350–460 BC	
Padanian Etruria	9th century – 5th century BC	
Paphlagonia	1480–183 BC	
Parvata	c. 9th century – 325 BC	
Persis	10th century – 550 BC	
Pragjyotisha	c. 11th century – 350 BC	
Philistia	1175–732 BC	
Phoenicia	1200–536 BC	
Phrygia	1200–700 BC	
Pisidia	8000 BC – 11th century AD	
Pundra	1300 BC – 550 AD	
Pi	1046–418 BC	
Qedar	870 BC – 250 AD	
Qi	1046–241 BC	
Qiang	2000 BC – 150 BC	
Qin	845–221 BC	
Quan	1250–704 BC	
Quanrong	954–301 BC	
Quwê	895–625 BC	
Saba	1100–275 BC	
Sam'al	1200–680 BC	
Saurashtra	950–355 BC	
Shakya	800–320 BC	
Sindhu	1300–320 BC	
Scythia	8th century BC – 2nd century AD	
Shěn	1050–500 BC	
Shu	1046–316 BC	
Song	1058–286 BC	
Sparta	11th century BC – 195 BC	
Surasena	1000–323 BC	
Tan	1046–684 BC	
Ta Netjeru/Land of Punt	2400–1069 BC	
Teng	1046–414 BC	
Tartessos	1000–450 BC	
Thebes	3200–30 BC	
Trigarta	1150–322 BC	
Tuwanuwa	1000–700 BC	
Tyrrhenia	1100–764 BC	
Upper Egypt	1070–664 BC	
Urartu	860–590 BC	
Vanga	1300 BC – 580 AD	
Văn Lang	2879–258 BC	Vietnam
Vatsa	1100–323 BC	
Vidarbha	1200–322 BC	
Virata	1200–322 BC	India
Western Guo	1046–687 BC	China
Wey	1046–687 BC	China
Wu	1046–473 BC	China
Xing	1046–632 BC	China
Xu	2000–512 BC	China
Yaksha	1200–350 BC	India
Yan	865–222 BC	China
Zheng	806–375 BC	China
Zhou	1045–256 BC	China
Zou	1012–350 BC	China

== See also ==
- List of Bronze Age states
- List of Classical Age states
- List of Iron Age states
- List of states during Antiquity
