= List of political entities in the 8th century BC =

Political entities in the 9th century BC – Political entities in the 7th century BC – Political entities by century

This is a list of states or polities that existed in the 8th century BC.

== Africa ==
| State | Existed |
|---|---|
| Assyria (Egypt) | 911–612 BC |
| Aethiopia | c. 13th – 5th centuries BC |
| Kingdom of Carthage | 814–650 BC |
| D'mt | 980–400 BC |
| Kingdom of Egypt | 1069–525 BC |
| Garamantia | 1000 BC – 700 AD |
| Kingdom of Kush | 1070 BC – 350 AD |
| Libu | 1550–146BC |
| Macrobia | c. 8th – 4th centuries BC |
| Nok | 1000 BC – 300 AD |
| Kingdom of Punt | 2400–1069 BC |

== Americas ==
| State | Existed |
|---|---|
| Adena culture | 1000–200 BC |
| Maya | 2000 BC – 900 AD |
| Olmec | 1400–400 BC |
| Paracas | 800–100 BC |
| Pueblo | 12th century BC – 14th century AD |

== Europe ==
=== North and West ===
| State | Existed |

=== South and East ===
| State | Existed |
|---|---|
| Kingdom of Alba Longa | 1200–753 BC |
| Arcadia | 1000–743 BC |
| Kingdom of Argolis | 1200–379 BC |
| Kingdom of Athens | 1556–1068 BC |
| Republic of Athens | 1068–355 BC |
| Boeotia | 1100–750 BC |
| Kingdom of Epirus | 1183–168 BC |
| Kingdom of Etruria | 768–264 BC |
| Iapydes | 9th century – 34 BC |
| Illyria | 2000–168 BC |
| Kingdom of Lacedaemon | 1300–950 BC |
| Liburnia | 11th century – 34 BC |
| Locria | 1250–386 BC |
| Lucania | 1000–356 BC |
| Kingdom of Macedonia | 860–146 BC |
| Magna Graecia | 740–89 BC |
| Messapia | 8th century – 89 BC |
| Messenia | 1300–724 BC |
| Oenotria | 1000–325 BC |
| Oscans | 1000–4th centuries BC |
| Padanian Etruria | 9th century – 5th century BC |
| Iapyges | 11th century – 89 BC |
| Kingdom of Rome | 753–509 BC |
| Kingdom of Sabinum | c. 760–494 BC |
| Sicani | c. 13th century – 300 BC |
| Sicels | c. 11th century – 425 BC |
| Kingdom of Sparta | 950–146 BC |
| Tartessos | 1000–450 BC |
| Thrace | 1200–450 BC |
| Tyrrhenia | 1100–764 BC |
| Venetia | c. 10th century – 231 BC |

== Eurasian Steppe and Central Asia ==
| name | existed |
|---|---|
| Bactria | 2140–550 BC |
| Kingdom of Balhara | 12th century – 7th century BC |
| Chorasmia | 1290–180 BC |
| Kingdom of Colchis | 1300 BC – 2nd century AD |
| Dahae | 700–530 BC |
| Magyar | 1100 BC – 895 AD |
| Iberia | 1000–302 BC |
| Qiang | 2000 BC – 150 BC |
| Xianyun | 824–209 BC |

== East Asia ==
| name | existed |
|---|---|
| Ba (state) | 13th century – 311 BC |
| Cai (state) | 980–447 BC |
| Cao (state) | 1053–487 BC |
| Chen (state) | 1046–479 BC |
| Chu (state) | 1030–223 BC |
| Deng (state) | 1200–678 BC |
| Donghu | 1400–150 BC |
| Eastern Guo | 1046–767 BC |
| Gojoseon | 2333–108 BC |
| Guan (state) | 1046–1040 BC |
| Gumie | 1046–480 BC |
| Western Han | 1046–764 BC |
| Huang (state) | 891–648 BC |
| Jin | 1042–376 BC |
| Kỷ line kingdom | 853–755 BC |
| Lu (state) | 1042–249 BC |
| Pi (state) | 1046–418 BC |
| Qi (Henan) | 1600–445 BC |
| Qi (state) | 1046–221 BC |
| Qin (state) | 858–221 BC |
| Quan (state) | 1250–704 BC |
| Quanrong | 954–301 BC |
| Shěn (state) | 1050–500 BC |
| Shu (state) | 1046–316 BC |
| Song (state) | 1058–286 BC |
| Sui (state) | 771–221 BC |
| Sumpa | 1600 BC – 7th century AD |
| Tan (state) | 1046–684 BC |
| Teng (state) | 1046–414 BC |
| Văn Lang | 2879–258 BC |
| Western Guo | 1046–687 BC |
| Wey (state) | 1046–687 BC |
| Wu (state) | 1046–473 BC |
| Xing (state) | 1046–632 BC |
| Xu (state) | 2000–512 BC |
| Yan (state) | 1046–222 BC |
| Zheng (state) | 806–375 BC |
| Zhou kingdom | 1046–256 BC |
| Zou (state) | 1012–350 BC |

== South Asia ==
| name | existed |
|---|---|
| Anarta kingdom | 1100–550 BC |
| Anga kingdom | 1380–550 BC |
| Asmaka kingdom | 1150–300 BC |
| Avanti kingdom | 900–322 BC |
| Chedi kingdom | 1250–344 BC |
| Chola kingdom | 2645–110 BC |
| Danda kingdom | 1100–450 BC |
| Dasarna kingdom | 1150–600 BC |
| Drangiana | 950–600 BC |
| Gurjara kingdom | 1000–550 BC |
| Haryanka kingdom | 684–413 BC |
| Himalaya kingdom | 600–322 BC |
| Kalinga kingdom | 1376–285 BC |
| Kamboja kingdom | 1450–195 BC |
| Kasmira kingdom | 1250–322 BC |
| Kekeya kingdom | 1250 – c. 4th century BC |
| Kimpurusha kingdom | 1000–325 BC |
| Kirata kingdom | 1350 – c. 300 BC |
| Kosala kingdom | 1300–266 BC |
| Kuru kingdom | 1376–285 BC |
| Lanka | 1200–543 BC |
| Madra kingdom | 1350–350 BC |
| Magadha kingdom | 1200–800 BC |
| Matsya kingdom | 1250–318 BC |
| Nepa kingdom | 750–323 BC |
| Panchala kingdom | 1200–700 BC |
| Pandya kingdom | 1350–460 BC |
| Parvata kingdom | c. 9th century – 325 BC |
| Pragjyotisha kingdom | c. 11th century – 350 BC |
| Pundra kingdom | 1300 BC – 550 AD |
| Saurashtra kingdom | 950–355 BC |
| Shakya Republic | 800–320 BC |
| Sindhu kingdom | 1300–320 BC |
| Surasena | 1300–323 BC |
| Trigarta kingdom | 1150–322 BC |
| Vanga kingdom | 1300 BC – 580 AD |
| Vatsa | 1100–323 BC |
| Vidarbha kingdom | 1200–322 BC |
| Virata kingdom | 1300–322 BC |
| Yaksha kingdom | 1200–350 BC |

== West Asia ==
| name | existed |
|---|---|
| Kingdom of Ammon | 1000–332 BC |
| Kingdom of Anshan | 717–646 BC |
| Kingdom of Aram Damascus | 1184–732 BC |
| Aramean Kingdom | 2300–700 BC |
| Kingdom of Awsan | 7th century BC – 100 AD |
| Arme-Shupria | 1290–1190 BC |
| Kingdom of Assyria | 1975–934 BC |
| Assyrian Empire | 911–612 BC |
| Bashan | 1330–928 BC |
| Kingdom of Bit-Istar | 12th century – 710 BC |
| Kingdom of Caria | 11th – 6th century BC |
| Chaldean Kingdom | 1100–539 BC |
| Principality of Corduene | 800 BC – 653 AD |
| Kingdom of Cilicia | 795–546 BC |
| Drangiana | 950–600 BC |
| Diauehi Kingdom | 1118–760 BC |
| Dilmun | 2600–675 BC |
| Doris | 1200–580 BC |
| Kingdom of Edom | 1200–125 BC |
| Elamite Empire | 1210–535 BC |
| Ellipian Kingdom | 850–609 BC |
| Kingdom of Eshnuna | 2000–8th century BC |
| Hittite Empire | 1600–1178 BC |
| Ionian Federation | 1070–545 BC |
| United Kingdom of Israel and Judah | 1000–930 BC |
| Kingdom of Israel (Samaria) | 930–720 BC |
| Kingdom of Judah | 930–586 BC |
| Lukka | 2000–1183 BC |
| Lullubi | 2400–650 BC |
| Kingdom of Lycia | 1183–546 BC |
| Kingdom of Lydia | 1200–680 BC |
| Mannaean Kingdom | 1110–616 BC |
| Magan | 2200–550 BC |
| Kingdom of Media | 750–678 BC |
| Kingdom of Mysia | 1320–301 BC |
| Nairi | 1190–890 BC |
| Namar Kingdom | 2350–750 BC |
| Neo-Hitti Kingdoms | 1200–800 BC |
| Paphlagonia | 1480–183 BC |
| Parsua | 860–600 BC |
| Kingdom of Persis | 10th century – 550 BC |
| Kingdom of Philistia | 1175–732 BC |
| Phoenicia | 1800–539 BC |
| Kingdom of Phrygia | 1200–700 BC |
| Qedar | 870 BC – 250 AD |
| Quwê | 895–625 BC |
| Kingdom of Saba | 1100–275 BC |
| Principality of Sam'al | 1200–680 BC |
| Saparda Kingdom | 7200–670 BC |
| Kingdom of Tabal | 1180–609 BC |
| Kingdom of Tarhuntassa | 1350–1200 BC |
| Kingdom of Troas | 3000–700 BC |
| Kingdom of Tuwanuwa | 1000–700 BC |
| Kingdom of Urartu | 860–590 BC |
| Principality of Zabdicene | 780 BC – 5th century AD |
| Zikirti Kingdom | 750–521 BC |

== See also ==
- List of Bronze Age states
- List of Classical Age states
- List of Iron Age states
- List of states during Antiquity
