= List of political entities in the 10th century BC =

Political entities in the 11th century BC – Political entities in the 9th century BC – Political entities by century

This is a list of states or polities that existed in the 10th century BC.

== Sovereign states ==
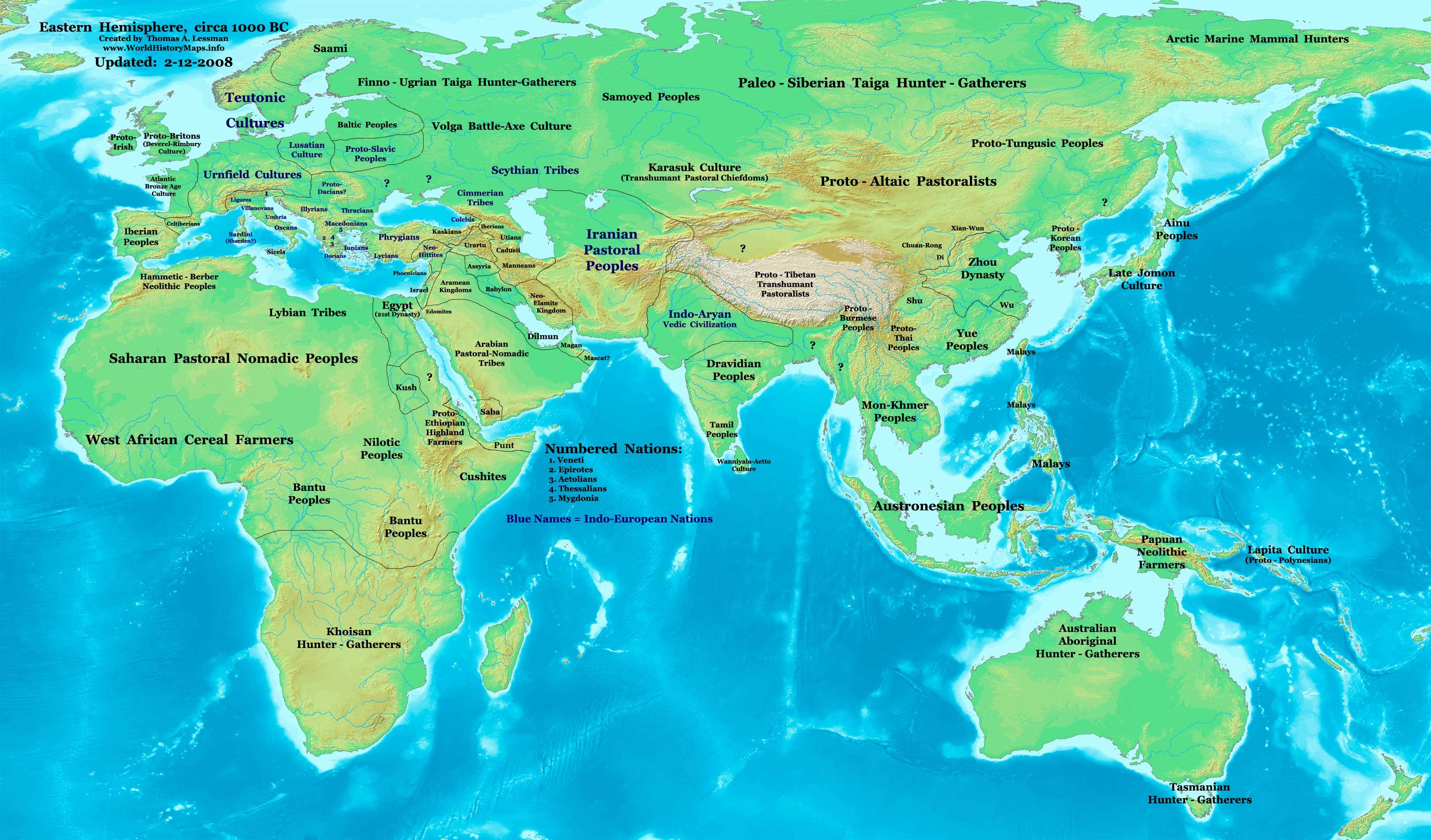
Map of the world in 1000 BC

Sovereign state	Years
Adena culture	1000–200 BC
Ammon	1000–332 BC
Alba Longa	1200–753 BC
Anarta	1100–550 BC
Anga	1380–550 BC
Aram Damascus	12th century BC – 734 BC
Aramea	2300–700 BC
Arcadia	1000–743 BC
Argolis	1200–379 BC
Asmaka	1150–300 BC
Assyria –	934–609 BC
Athens	1556–355 BC
Avanti	900–322 BC
Ba	13th century – 311 BC
Babylonia	1155–689 BC
Bashan	1330–928 BC
Bithynia	297–74 BC
Bit-Istar	12th century – 710 BC
Cai	980–447 BC
Cao	1053–487 BC
Caria	11th – 6th century BC
Carthage	814–650 BC
Chaldea	1100–539 BC
Chavín culture	900–200 BC
Chedi	1250–344 BC
Chen	855–479 BC
Chola	3rd century BC – 1279 AD
Corduene	800 BC – 653 AD
Chorasmia	1290–180 BC
Chorrera	1800–300 BC
Chu	1030–223 BC
Colchis	1300 BC – 2nd century AD
Danda	1100–450 BC
Dasarna	1150–600 BC
Deng	1200–678 BC
D'mt	c.980 – c.400 BC
Diauehi	1118–760 BC
Dilmun	2600–675 BC, 1200–125 BC
Donghu	1400–150 BC
Doris	1100–560 BC
Drangiana	950–600 BC
Eastern Guo	1046–767 BC
Edom	1200–125 BC
Elam	2800–550 BC, 850–609 BC
Epirus	1183–168 BC
Eshnuna	2000–8th century BC
Etruria	1200–550 BC
Gandhara	1450–510 BC
Gojoseon	2333–108 BC
Gumie	1046–480 BC
Han	1046–764 BC
Huang	891–648 BC
Iberia	1000–302 BC
Illyria	2000–168 BC
Ionia	1070–545 BC
Israel	930 BCE – 720 BCE
Jin	1042–376 BC
Jiroft	3100–2200 BC
Judah	930–586 BC
Kalinga	1376–285 BC
Kamboja	1450–195 BC
Kasi	600–345 BC
Kasmira	1250–322 BC
Kekeya	1250 – c. 4th century BC
Kikata	2000–1700 BC
Kimpurusha	1000–325 BC
Kirata	1350 – c. 300 BC
Kosala	1300–266 BC
Kuru	1376–285 BC
Kush	1070 BC – 350
Kỷ line	853–755 BC
Lower Egypt	1070–664 BC
Liburnia	11th century – 34 BC
Locria	1250–386 BC
Lu	856–256 BC
Lucania	1000–356 BC
Lullubi	2400–650 BC
Lycia	1250–546 BC
Lydia	1200–546 BC
Madra	1350–350 BC
Magadha	1200–600 BC
Mannaea	1110–616 BC
Magan	2200–550 BC
Matsya	1250–318 BC
Messenia	1300–724 BC
Minaea	580–85 BC
Moab	1300–400 BC
Mysia	1320–301 BC
Nairi	1190–890 BC
Namar	2350–750 BC
Nok	1000 BC – 300 AD
Olmec	1400–400 BC
Oenotria	1000–325 BC
Oscans	1000–4th centuries BC
Panchala	800–323 BC
Pandya	1350–460 BC
Padanian Etruria	9th century – 5th century BC
Paphlagonia	1480–183 BC
Parvata	c. 9th century – 325 BC
Persis	10th century – 550 BC
Pragjyotisha	c. 11th century – 350 BC
Philistia	1175–732 BC
Phoenicia	1200–536 BC
Phrygia	1200–700 BC
Pisidia	8000 BC – 11th century AD
Pundra	1300 BC – 550 AD
Punt	2722 BC – 910 BC
Pi	1046–418 BC
Qedar	870 BC – 250 AD
Qi	1046–241 BC
Qiang	2000 BC – 150 BC
Qin	845–221 BC
Quan	1250–704 BC
Quanrong	954–301 BC
Quwê	895–625 BC
Saba	1100–275 BC
Sam'al	1200–680 BC
Samaria	930–720 BC
Saurashtra	950–355 BC
Shakya	800–320 BC
Sindhu	1300–320 BC
Scythia	8th century BC – 2nd century AD
Shěn	1050–500 BC
Shu	1046–316 BC
Song	1058–286 BC
Sparta	11th century BC – 195 BC
Surasena	1000–323 BC
Tan	1046–684 BC
Ta Netjeru/Land of Punt	2400–1069 BC
Teng	1046–414 BC
Tartessos	1000–450 BC
Thebes	3200–30 BC
Trigarta	1150–322 BC
Tuwanuwa	1000–700 BC
Tyrrhenia	1100–764 BC
Upper Egypt	1070–664 BC
Urartu	860–590 BC
Vanga	1300 BC – 580 AD
Văn Lang	2879–258 BC
Vatsa	1100–323 BC
Vidarbha	1200–322 BC
Virata	1200–322 BC
Western Guo	1046–687 BC
Wey	1046–687 BC
Wu	1046–473 BC
Xing	1046–632 BC
Xu	2000–512 BC
Yaksha	1200–350 BC
Yan	865–222 BC
Zheng	806–375 BC
Zhou	1045–256 BC
Zou	1012–350 BC

== See also ==
- List of Bronze Age states
- List of Classical Age states
- List of Iron Age states
- List of states during Antiquity
