= List of political entities in the 12th century BC =

Political entities in the 13th century BC – Political entities in the 11th century BC – Political entities by century

This is a list of political entities in the 12th century BC (1200–1101 BC).

== Sovereign states ==
Sovereign state	Years
Alba Longa	1200 - 753 BC
Anga	1380 - 550 BC
Aram Damascus	12th century BC - 734 BC
Aramea	2300 - 700 BC
Argolis	1200 - 379 BC
Asmaka	1150 - 300 BC
Assyria	2025 - 911 BC
Athens	1556 - 355 BC
Ba	13th century - 311 BC
Babylonia	1155 - 689 BC
Bashan	1330 - 928 BC
Bithynia	297 - 74 BC
Bit-Istar	12th century - 710 BC
Chedi	1250 - 344 BC
Chola	3rd century BC - 1279 AD
Chorasmia	1290 - 180 BC
Chorrera	1800 - 300 BC
Colchis	1300 BC - 2nd century AD
Danda	1100 - 450 BC
Dasarna	1150 - 600 BC
Deng	1200 - 678 BC
Diauehi	1118 - 760 BC
Dilmun	2600 - 675 BC
Donghu	1400 - 150 BC
Eastern Guo	1046 - 767 BC
Edom	1200 - 125 BC
Egypt	3050 - 322 BC
Elam	2800 - 550 BC
Epirus	1183 - 168 BC
Eshnuna	2000 - 8th century BC
Etruria	1200 - 550 BC
Gandhara	1450 - 510 BC
Gojoseon	2333 - 108 BC
Illyria	2000 - 168 BC
Jiroft	3,100 - 2,200 BC
Kalinga	1376 - 285 BC
Kamboja	1450 - 195 BC
Kasi	600 - 345 BC
Kasmira	1250 - 322 BC
Kekeya	1250 - c. 4th century BC
Kikata	2000 - 1700 BC
Kirata	1350 - c. 300 BC
Kosala	1300 - 266 BC
Kuru	1376 - 285 BC
Liburnia	11th century - 34 BC
Locria	1250 - 386 BC
Lullubi	2400 - 650 BC
Lycia	1250 - 546 BC
Lydia	1200 - 546 BC
Madra	1350 - 350 BC
Magadha	1200 - 600 BC
Mannaea	1110 - 616 BC
Magan	2200 - 550 BC
Matsya	1250 - 318 BC
Messenia	1300 - 724 BC
Minaea	580 - 85 BC
Moab	1300 - 400 BC
Mysia	1320 - 301 BC
Nairi	1190 - 890 BC
Namar	2350 - 750 BC
Olmec	1400 - 400 BC
Pandya	1350 - 460 BC
Paphlagonia	1480 - 183 BC
Philistia	1175 - 732 BC
Phoenicia	1200 - 536 BC
Phrygia	1200 - 700 BC
Pundra	1300 BC - 550 AD
Qiang	2000 BC - 150 BC
Quan	1250 - 704 BC
Saba	1100 - 275 BC
Sam'al	1200 - 680 BC
Sindhu	1300 - 320 BC
Song	1058 - 286 BC
Vanga	1300 BC - 580 AD
Văn Lang	2879 - 258 BC
Vidarbha	1200 - 322 BC
Virata	1200 - 322 BC
Xu	2000 - 512 BC
Yaksha	1200 - 350 BC

== See also ==
- List of Bronze Age states
- List of Classical Age states
- List of Iron Age states
- List of states during Antiquity
