= Fu Hao owl zun =

Bronze artefact from the Shang dynasty

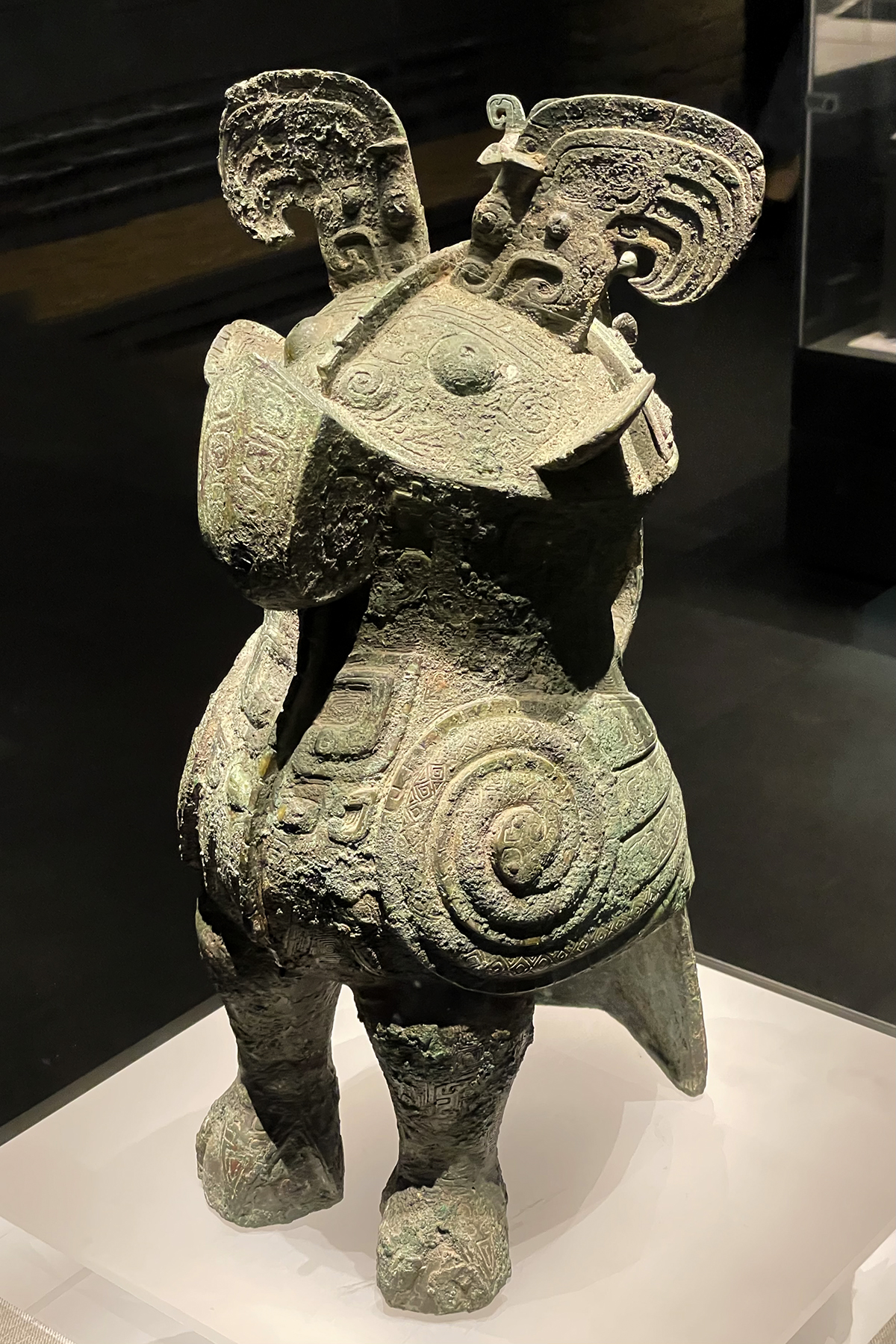
- Fu Hao zun at the Henan Museum
- Height: 46.3 cm
- Created: c. 1200 BC
- Discovered: 1976; Anyang, Henan, China

The Fu Hao owl zun (simplified Chinese: 妇好鸮尊; traditional Chinese: 婦好鴞尊; pinyin: Fù Hǎo xiāo zūn) are a pair of two zun vessels from the Chinese Shang dynasty discovered in 1976 in the Tomb of Fu Hao, at Yinxu in present-day Anyang, Henan. Considered a prominent example of the usage of the owl motif in Shang dynasty ritual bronzes, the works are now held by the Henan Museum and the National Museum of China.

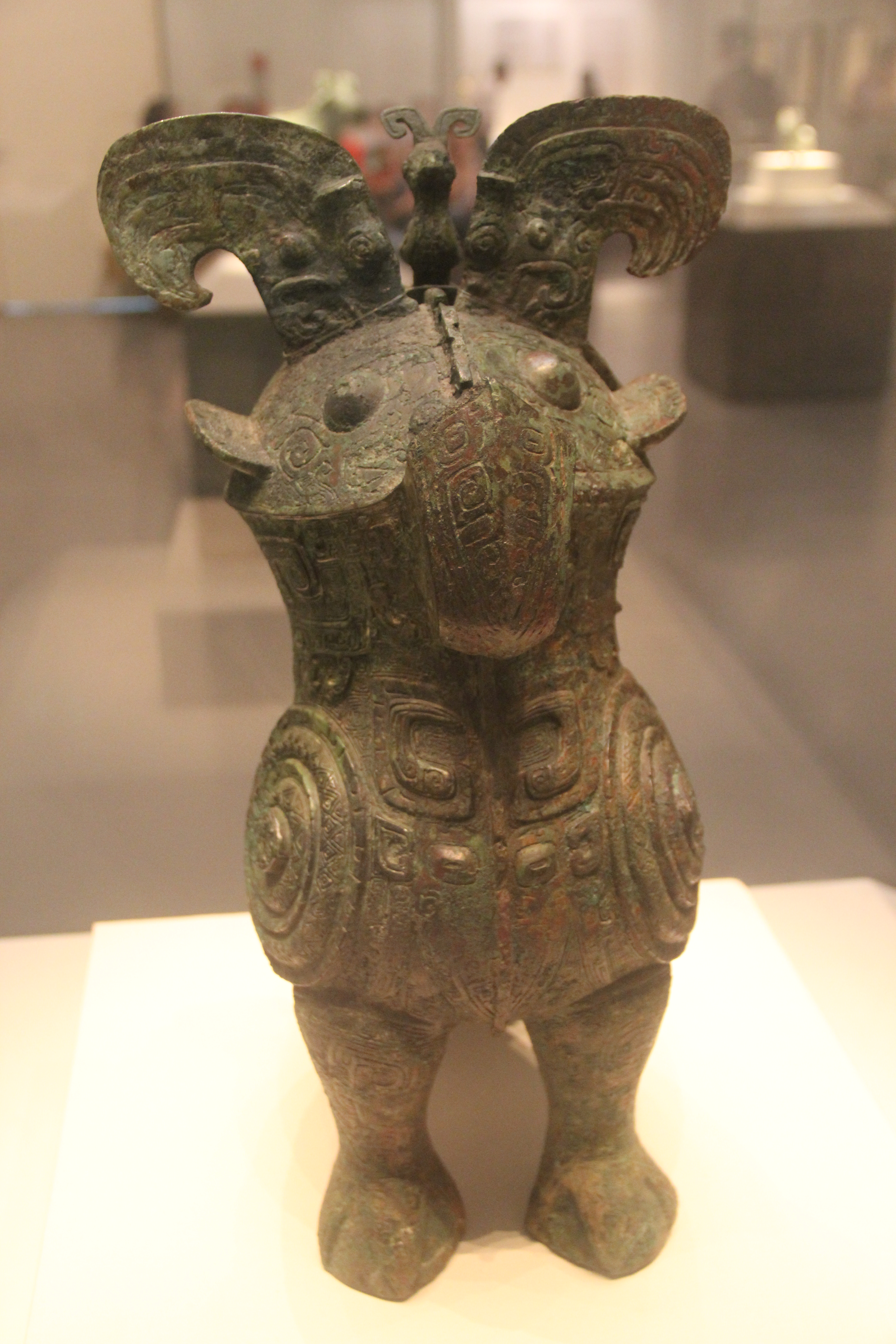
Fu Hao zun at the National Museum of China

== Description ==
A zun vessel, prominently used during the Shang and early Zhou dynasty, is primarily used for storing wine, with a wide opening for drinking. They often come in two forms: one that is trumpet-shaped, or often, in the themes of animals. The bronze owls found in the tomb measure 46.3 centimetres (18.2 in), with a mouth length of 16.4 centimetres (6.5 in), shaped in the form of a tripod, with its tail serving as a third leg. Its head is raised upward, its chest protruding forward, and its wings are folded. On the body of the vessel, the beak and breasts carry the patterns of cicadas, thunder, motifs, a snake pattern on the tail, and the neck carries the pattern of Kui.

Written onto the vessels are the archaic characters of Fu Hao, the owner of the tomb, wife of Shang Dynasty leader Wu Ding. The records from oracle bones and the contents of the tomb, designated Tomb 5 in Xiaotun, (468 bronzes), indicate her prominence in Shang society, along with her role as a military leader at the time.

== The Owl Motif ==
In addition to the zun vessels, a double fangyi, a guang (vessel), and six pendants found in the tomb had an owl motif. It is believed, based on artistic depictions, that the owl was a prominent "totem" of the Shang dynasty, with depictions placed on the burial artifacts of its rulers, and that superstitions of owls being seen as a bad omen was largely implemented during the Zhou dynasty.

Owls are called xiao (枭) or chixiao (鸱鸮), and are often interpreted as supernatural figures, with its reputation waxing and waning based upon the ruling dynasty, whether as a predator of rats, in times when grain agriculture was valued, or harbingers of bad omens.
