= Han (SE Zhou state) =

Ancient Chinese state under the Zhou dynasty

State of Han
- Traditional Chinese: 邗國
- Simplified Chinese: 邗国
Transcriptions
Standard Mandarin
- Hanyu Pinyin: Hánguó
- Wade–Giles: Han-kuo; Han Kuo

Han
- Chinese: 邗
Transcriptions
Standard Mandarin
- Hanyu Pinyin: Hán
- Wade–Giles: Han

Wuhan
- Traditional Chinese: 呉邗
- Simplified Chinese: 吴邗
Transcriptions
Standard Mandarin
- Hanyu Pinyin: Wúhán
- Wade–Giles: Wu-han

Han was a minor Chinese state under the Zhou dynasty, located in present-day Jiangsu province. It was established by sinicized refugees from the central plains, who established a new vassal state in the Shugang Hills (simplified Chinese: 陈国; traditional Chinese: 陳國; pinyin: Shǔgāngshān) to the southeast of Zhou kingdom. Its capital—also named Han—was located in the southern area of present-day Huai'an municipality. By the early Spring and Autumn period at the latest, Han was conquered by the state of Wu, whose King Fuchai named his Han Canal (simplified Chinese: 邗沟; traditional Chinese: 邗溝; pinyin: Hángōu) and Hancheng (at present-day Yangzhou) after it.

== See also ==
- Han (NW Zhou state)
- Han (disambiguation)
