= Pu's wild goose he =

Goose shaped Zhou Dynasty ritual bronze

Pu's Wild Goose he
- 匍雁形铜盉
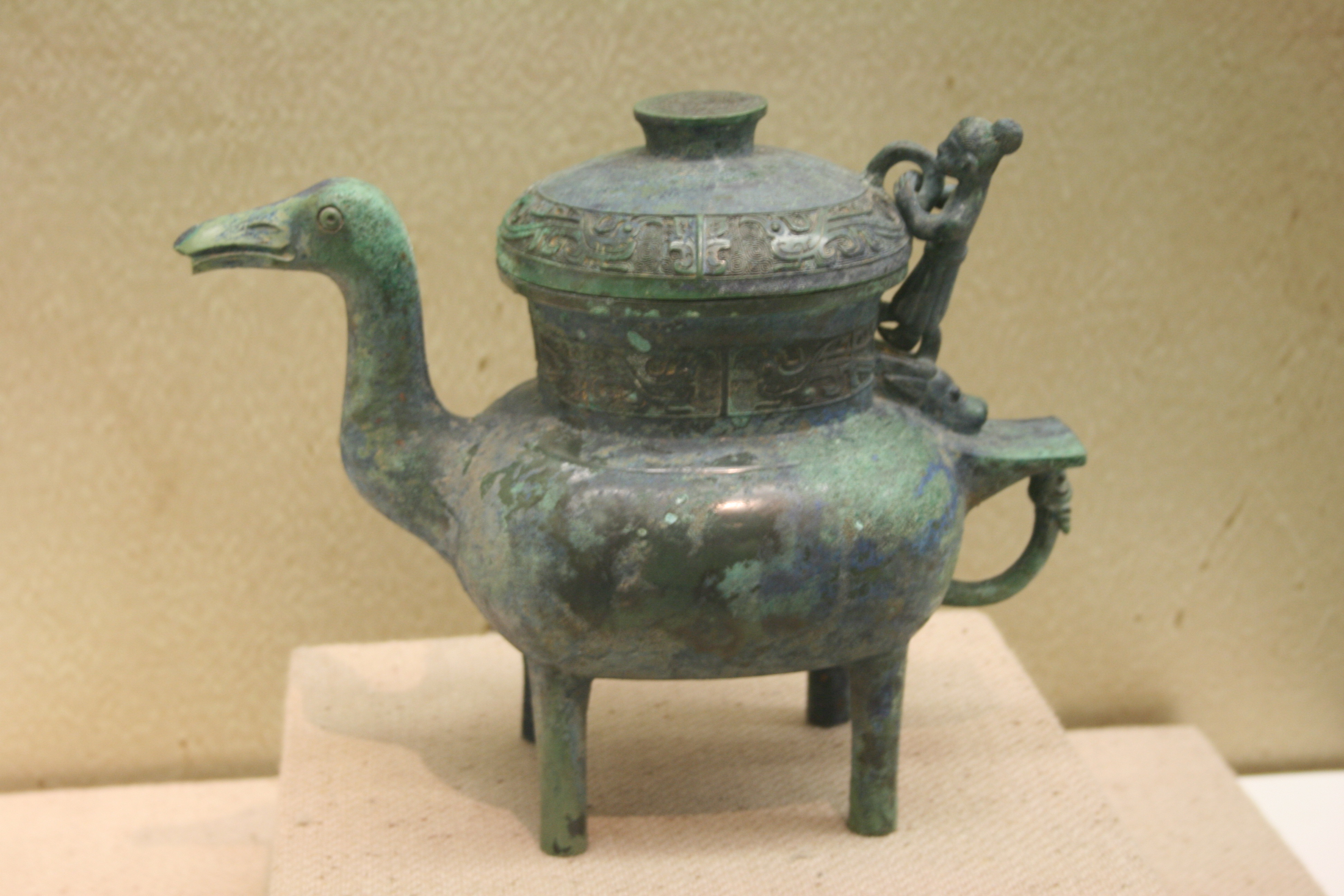
- Material: Bronze
- Length: 14.3 cm (5.6 in)
- Height: 25.2 cm (9.9 in)
- Width: 17.2 cm (6.8 in)
- Weight: 3.55 kg (7.8 lb)
- Writing: Chinese bronze inscriptions; Old Chinese
- Created: 1046-771 BC
- Discovered: 1988; Tomb M50, Ying State Cemetery, Pingdingshan, Henan Province, China
- Present location: Henan Museum
- Culture: Western Zhou

Pu's wild goose he (Chinese: 匍雁形铜盉; pinyin: Pú yàn xíng tóng hé) is a Western Zhou Chinese ritual bronze vessel in the shape of a goose discovered in the Ying State Cemeteries in Pingdingshan, Henan Province. With its interior bearing a 44-character inscription, the vessel serves as an important diplomatic document in the Western Zhou court, commemorating an official named Pu (匍), who was buried with it.

It is currently exhibited at the Henan Museum.

== History ==
Ying was a vassal state of the Western Zhou dynasty up until the Spring and Autumn period, with its capital in modern-day Pingdingshan. Around the cemetery of the Ying State, many nobles of the Western Zhou and the Eastern Zhou were buried. The area saw continuous usage over time, prominently into the Han dynasty, with some additional burials dating to the Tang and Qing dynasty. With excavation surveys, 80 Zhou tombs and 400 Han tombs were observed on the site, and in 1988, in designated Tomb M50, this vessel was found in a simple grave of an individual aged between 40 and 45, the body oriented north to south. Among the bronze and tin grave goods was the vessel which gave the identity to the deceased.

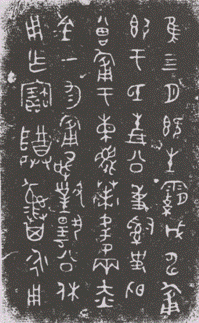
Inscription found under the lid

== Description ==
The he (盉) typically in the form of a kettle, a large belly, slanting spout on one side, and handle on the opposite site, standing on four legs, and a lid fastened with a chain. It is generally interpreted as a wine-mixer/heater though other speculation is that it is a spice-mixer or a water container. Pu's he is goose-shaped, neck raised and head high, eyes open with the bill serving the spout, standing on four legs. The lid has a knob that's thicker on the top, which is connected to a human figure, which stands at the goose's tail, which is shaped like a dragon. It has a capacity of 2.125 liters of fluid.

Under the lid is a 44-character inscription of disputed meaning. Wang Longzheng believes that it records a diplomatic interaction between the states of Ying and Xing, whereby an official from Ying named Pu presented gifts to the ruler of Xing (邢公), who returned the favor by gifting copper to Pu. Other scholars, such as Li Xueqin, believe that 邢公 (Xing Gong) should be read as 青公 (Qing Gong), who was an official under the Zhou court. Pu was receiving a gift from the king (possibly King Mu) via Qing Gong due to his participation in a recent battle.

Vessels in the shape of animals took form starting in the Shang dynasty, and peaked with Zhou. Though animal shaped vessels declined during the Spring and Autumn and Warring States period, the bronze vessels influenced ceramics in the shape of birds during the Qin and Han.
