= Yan, King of Song =

Duke then King of Song (died 286 BC)

Yan 偃
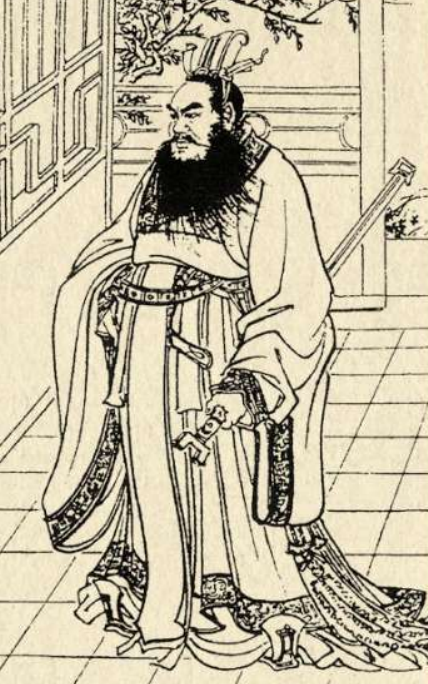
- 1957 illustration.

King of Song
- Reign: 318–286 BC
- Predecessor: New title
- Successor: state annexed by Qi

Duke of Song
- Reign: 328–318 BC
- Predecessor: Lord Ticheng
- Successor: crowned as the king
- Born: ?
- Died: 286 BC; Wen, Wei
Names
- ancestral name Zǐ (子) clan name Dài (戴); Given name Yǎn (偃)

Yan, King of Song (Chinese: 宋王偃, died 286 BC), also known as King Kang of Song (宋康王) or King Xian of Song (宋獻王), was the last ruler of Song. He ruled the state between 328 BC until his death in 286 BC.

Yan was a descendant of Duke Dai, the 11th ruler of Song. He was also a younger brother of Lord Ticheng. Just like his elder brother, Yan was a usurper too. In 328 BC, he killed Lord Ticheng and seized the throne.

Yan was ambitious ruler, during his reign, Song had succeeded in beating troops from Chu, Wei and Qi and annexing Teng. According to Mencius, though Song was a small state, he was setting about to practise the "true royal government" (王政). However, in Records of the Grand Historian and many other history books, he was described as a tyrant and oppressor.

In 318 BC, Yan declared himself to be King of Song. Song was at odds with its powerful neighbors, including Qi and Wei. In 286 BC, King Min of Qi plotted with the states of Chu and Wei for a joint expedition against Song, Yan fled to Wei and died there. Finally, Song was partitioned by Qi, Chu and Wei.
