= Henan Museum =

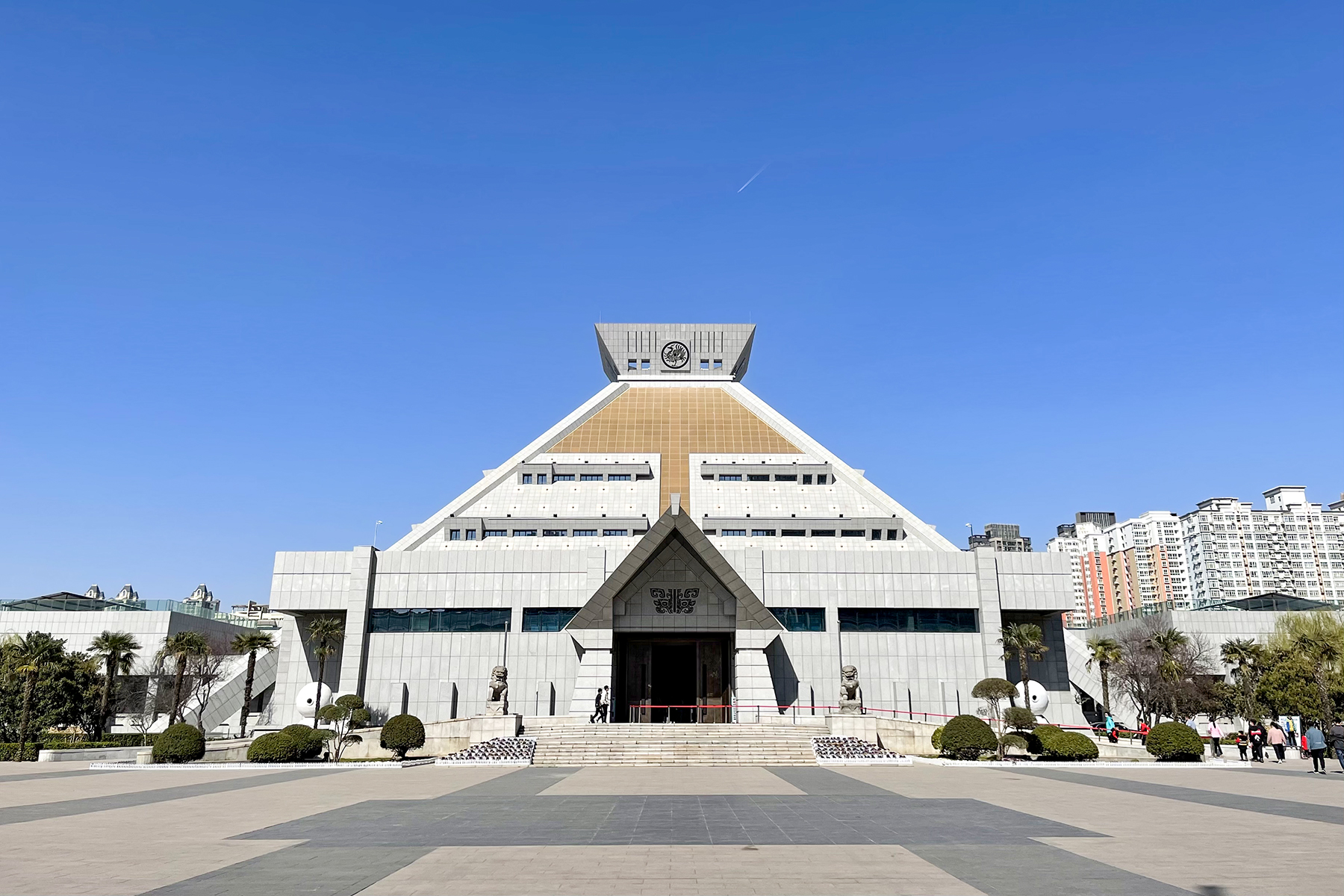

- Location of the museum Henan Museum (China)
- Established: June 1927
- Location: Jinshui District, Zhengzhou, Henan, China
- Coordinates: 34.7895°N 113.6661°E
- Type: History museum, art museum
- Website: www.chnmus.net

The Henan Museum (Chinese: 河南博物院; pinyin: Hénán Bówùyuàn), located in Zhengzhou, Henan Province, China, is a history and archaeology museum. It has a collection of more than 130,000 pieces of cultural relics through the ages. In addition to its collection of human history the museum is also home to many relics of natural history including dinosaur bones and fossils. Henan Museum's present building, which opened in 1997, occupies an area of more than 100,000 square feet, with a total floor space of 78,000 square feet.

== Collections ==
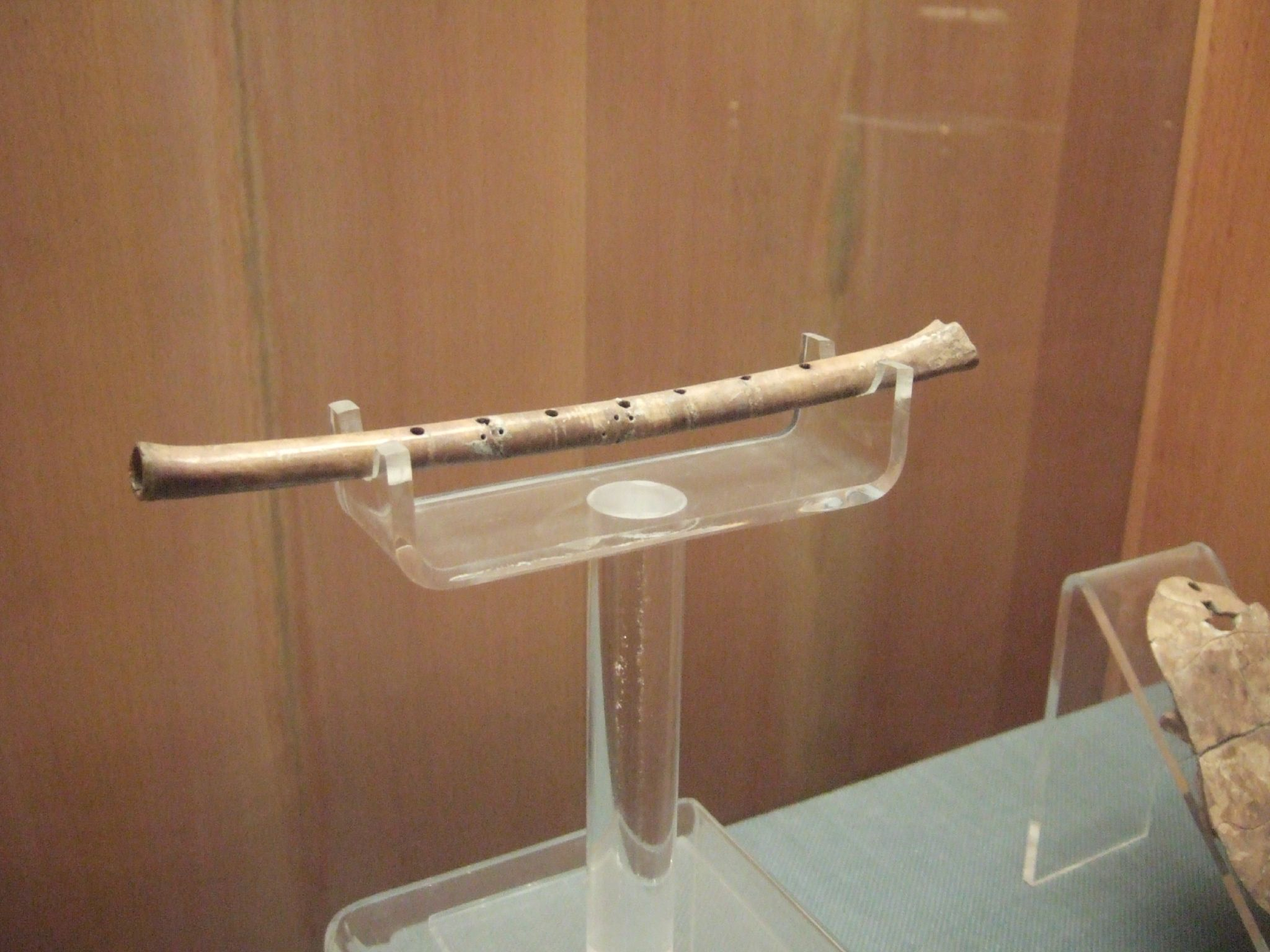
A gudi flute discovered at Jiahu on display at the Henan Museum.

At present the museum has a collection of more than 130,000 pieces of cultural relics treasures, of which more than 5,000 pieces are treasures of the first and second grades. Among them, the prehistoric cultural relics, bronze vessels of the Shang and Zhou dynasties, and pottery and porcelain wares of the various dynasties in Chinese history possess most distinguishing features. Inside the museum, there are basic exhibition halls, specialized exhibition halls and provisional exhibition halls. For the first batch of exhibitions, two basic displays and six specialized displays are offered.

== History ==
Henan Museum is one of the oldest museums in China. In June 1927, General Feng Yuxiang, the commander in chief of the National Revolutionary Army and the chairman of Henan Province at that time, proposed that “Education is the Essential Politics for a Country (教育为立国根本要政)”. In July, the founding committee of the Henan Museum was established. The site designated for the museum was the former Legal and Law School, which was located at Kaifeng Court West Street (Sansheng Temple Street, Kaifeng today). Thus, the Museum was born.

In May 1928, the former provincial government changed the name of Henan Museum into “National Museum” to represent the history and actuality of the nationalities. On December 1, 1930, Henan Provincial Government changed “National Museum” back to “Henan Museum” as a social educational organization directly under the Provincial Educational Ministry. The schoolhouse of the Demotic Normal School was taken as a showplace of antiques. The Storing Department and the Collection & Investigation Department were set up. The Executive Council was established, including the directors of the Civil Administration Office and Educational Office, the president of Henan University, and the Museum curator. The 19 showrooms of the former National Museum were renovated in 7 and enriched with historical cultural relics instead of the many folk fineries and models. During the years from 1930 through 1937, Henan Museum underwent an unprecedented development. Under the guidance of a team of highly skilled researchers led by Guan Baiyi, the Museum amassed fine and substantial collections focusing on local history. At that time Henan Museum became very famous, gaining recognition both at home and abroad.

In 1937 the Marco Polo Bridge Incident erupted and the Japanese army formally invaded China. The Museum was closed and 68 boxes of key cultural relics were moved to Chongqing, the Republic of China's wartime capital in southwest China. Hundreds of boxes from the Palace Museum had also been shipped off by the Kuomintang to Chongqing for safe-keeping. Nevertheless, in 1940, the Japanese occupation government reopened the Henan Museum as “Henan Provincial Museum” with several departments such as Affair Office, Storage Department, and Investigation Department. After the Anti-Japanese War, the Kuomintang's Honan Provincial Government resumed management of the Museum. By 1948, many of the museum's artifacts had once again been boxed and moved for safe-keeping, this time to Taiwan. These artifacts formed part of the National Museum of History in Taipei. After the Liberation Army entered Kaifeng, in November 1949, Qu Naisheng, director of the Provincial Education Office, was nominated by the Henan Provincial Government as curator of the Museum.

In 1961, along with the move of the provincial capital, Henan Museum moved from Kaifeng to Zhengzhou. In 1991 the museum was remodeled. In 1999 the official reopening to public was held and the name was officially declared as the "Henan Museum". The new Museum is located in central Zhengzhou on the Agriculture (Nongye) Road. The main building, at the center of the grounds, is in the shape of pyramid. Behind it is a storeroom for culture relics, around it there are the electrified education building, combined service building, office building and training building. The design of the new museum incorporates the artistic style and culture of central China.

== Facilities ==
Provisions such as an audio tour, magnified video-tape playing, computer consultation, and interactive facilities are provided for visitors.

Henan Museum is equipped with advanced security system, automatic building management system, audio-visual education system, service information computer network system, cultural relics preservation, protection and research system and other high technology equipment.

== Gallery ==
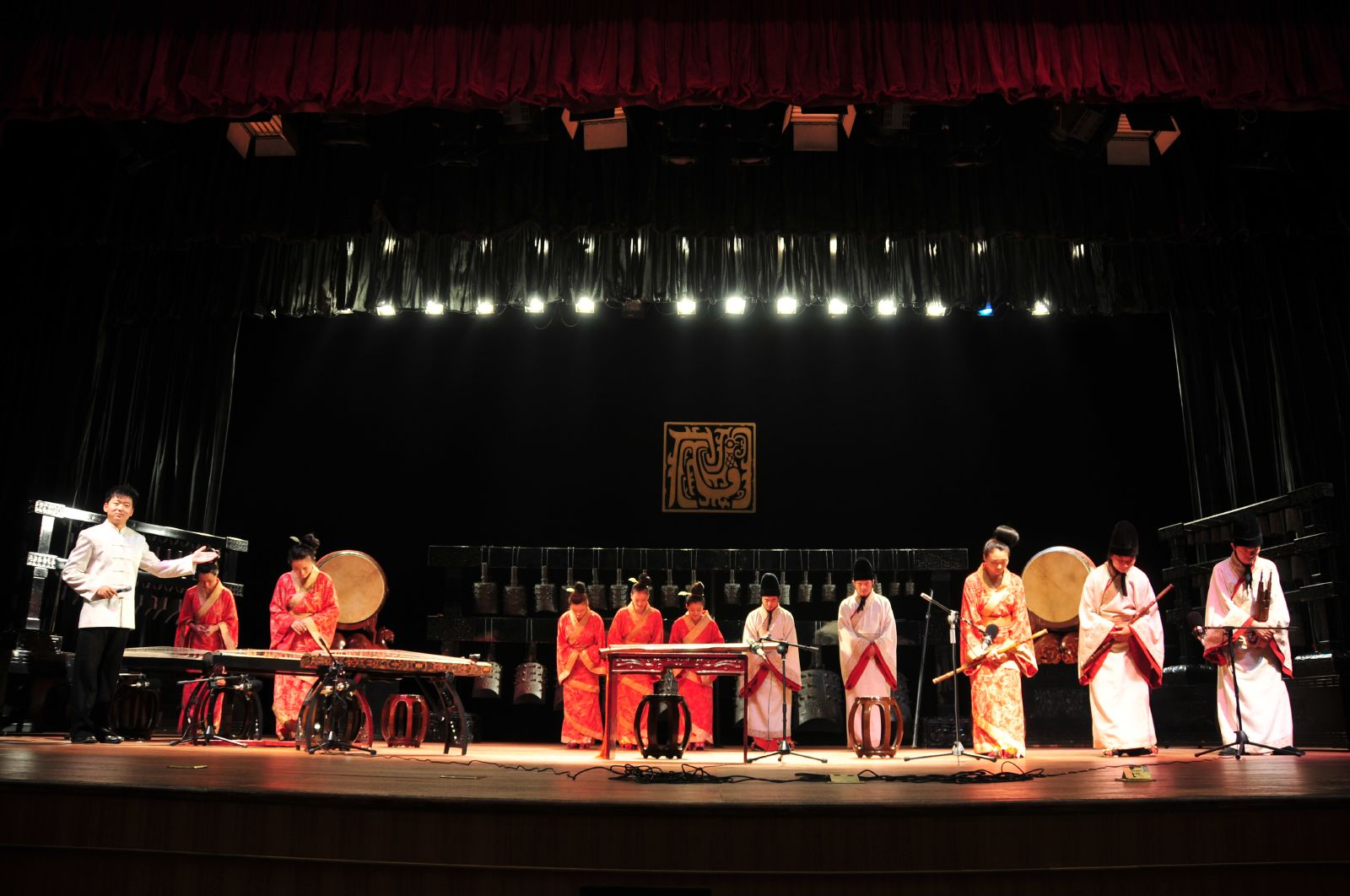
A traditional musical performance at the museum

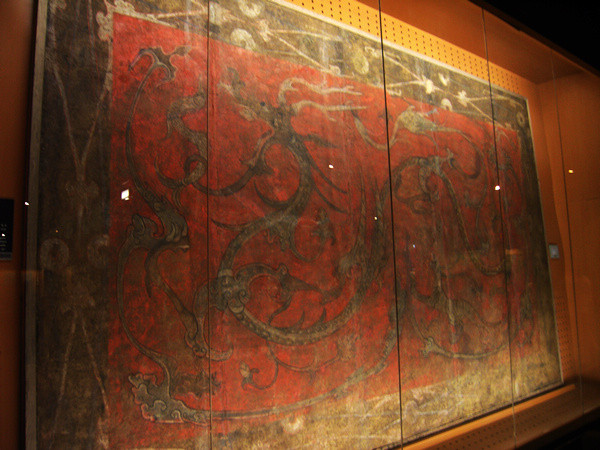
Painting of four animals in cloud

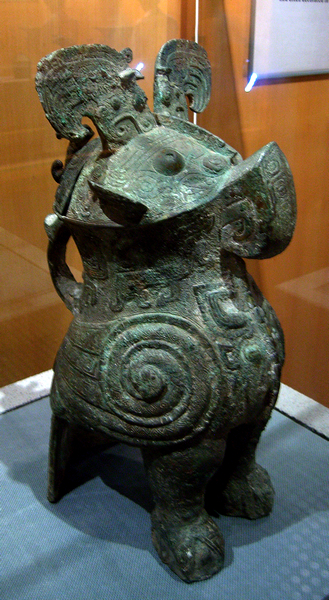
Bronze Fuhao owl

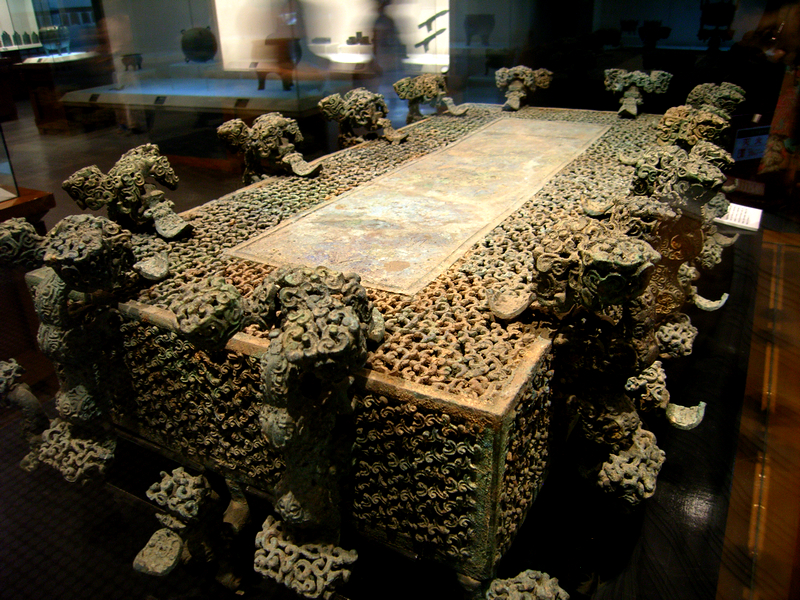
Bronze Moire copper Ban

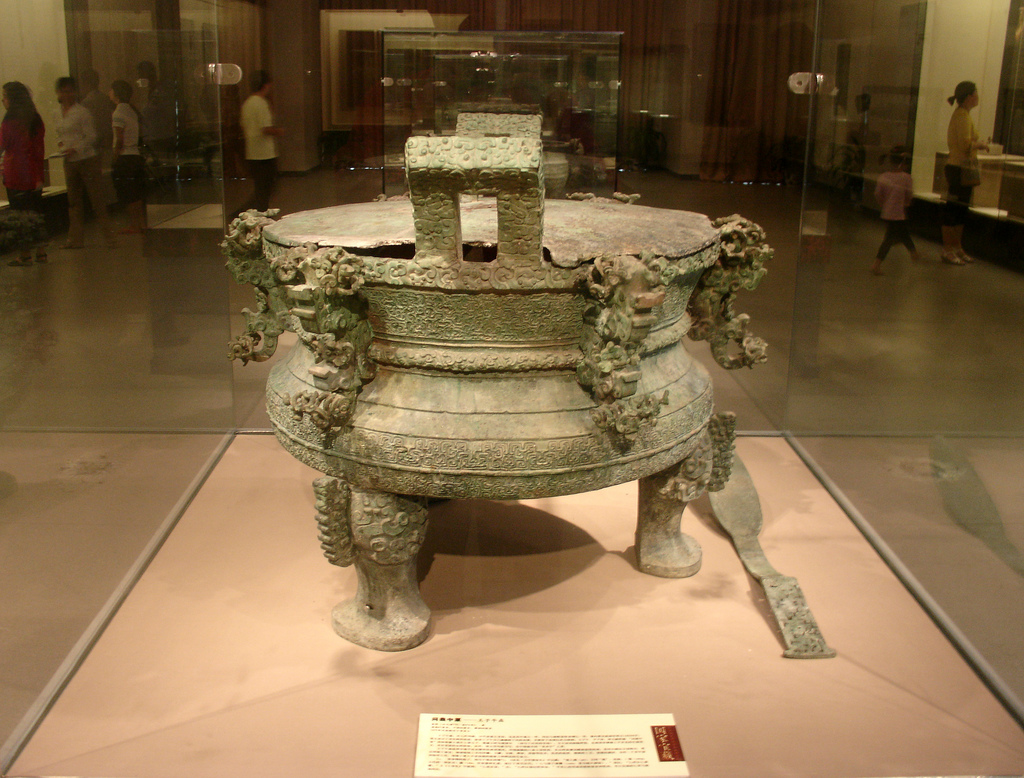
Wangzi Wuding

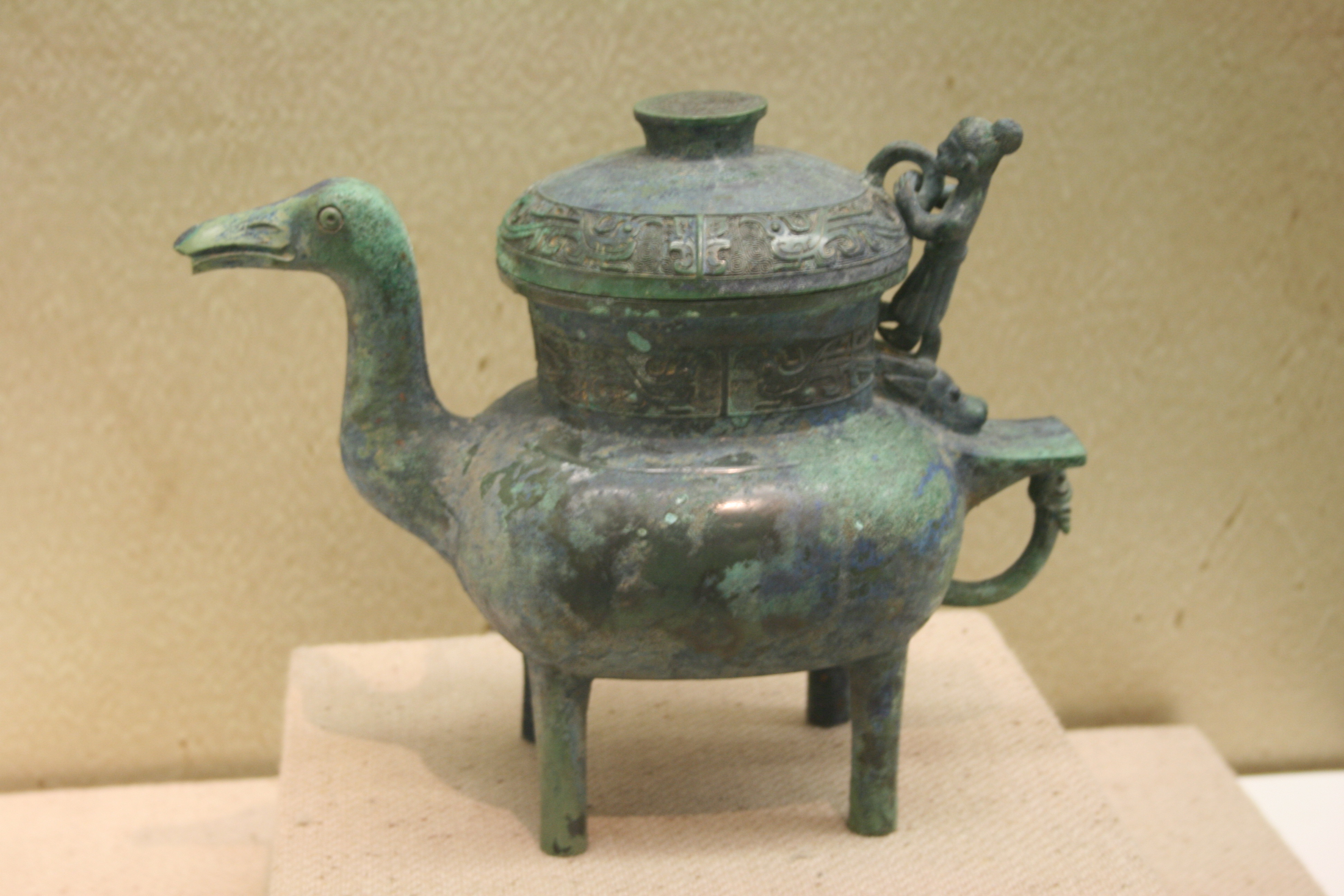
Pu's Wild Goose he

== See also ==
- List of museums in China
