= Messapus =

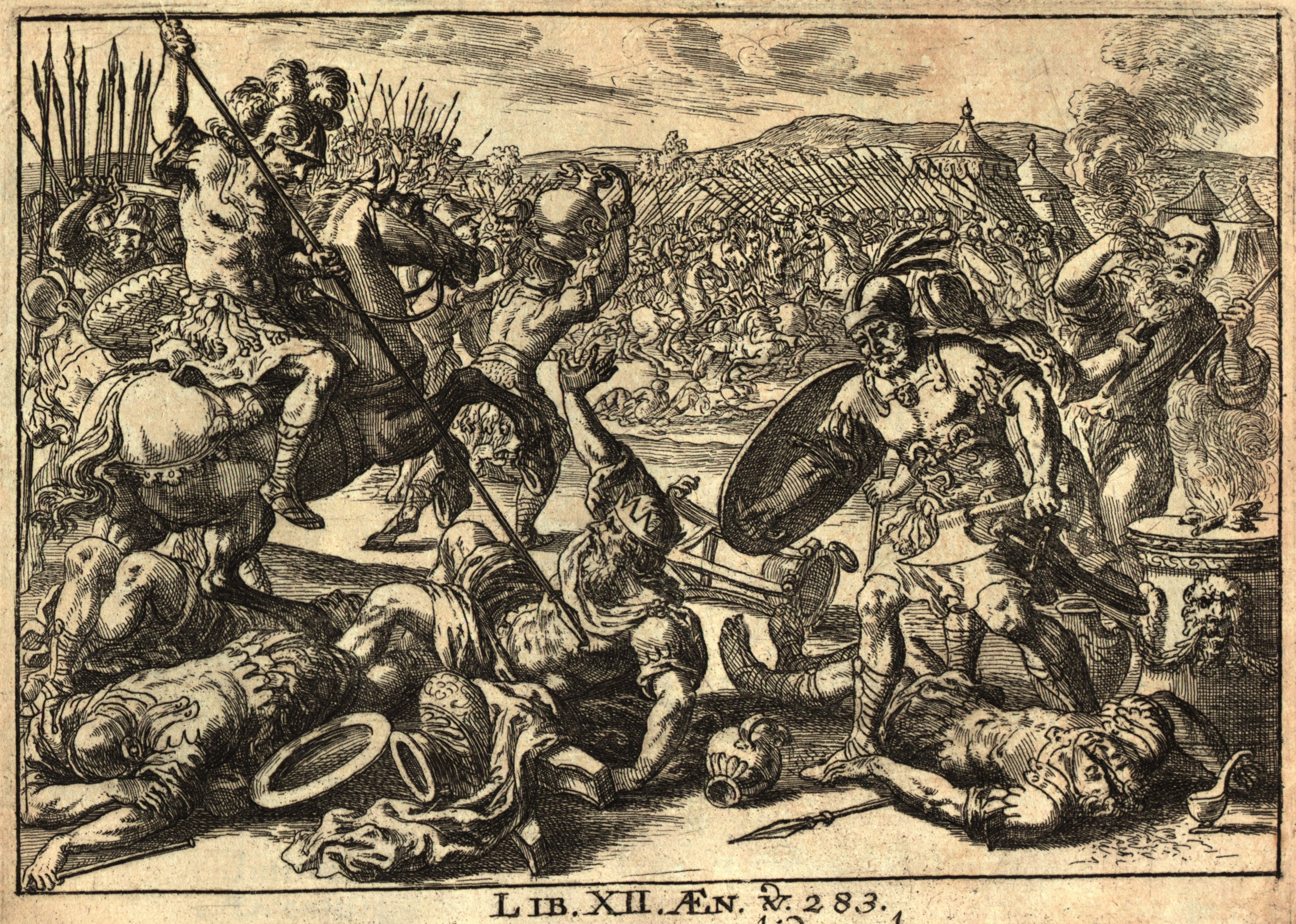
Messapus (left) killing Aulestes in a 1688 engraving

Messapus, (Ancient Greek: Μέσσαπος, romanized: Messapos, lit. 'amid waters' or 'in the middle of waters') a character in Virgil's Aeneid, appears in Books VII to XII of the Latin epic poem. He was a son of Neptune, a famous tamer of horses, and king of Etruria, known for being one "whom no one can fell by fire or steel" (Mandelbaum, VII.911–912).

== Narrative ==
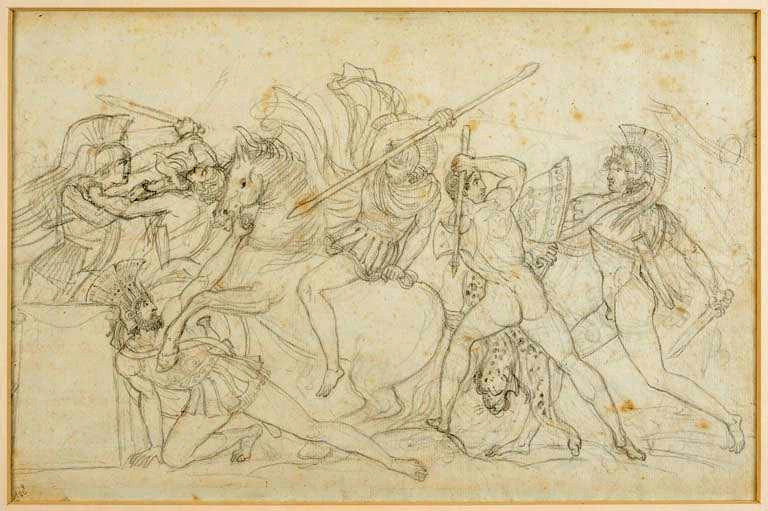
Messapus on horseback (centre), attacking Aulestes in a drawing by Anne-Louis Girodet de Roussy-Trioson

Although accustomed to peace, in Book VII Messapus joins forces with Turnus in his battle against Aeneas and the Trojans. Book VIII lists him as one of Turnus' chief captains, along with Ufens and Mezentius.

In Book IX, which recounts the nighttime raid by Nisus and Euryalus on the Rutulian camp, the battle helmet of Messapus is taken by Euryalus. Light reflected off the stolen helmet, betraying Euryalus to his enemies and leading not only to his own death, but also that of Nisus.

Messapus fought in battle in Book X, killing Clonius, and Ericetes son of Lycaon. In Book XI, he led a cavalry charge alongside Coras and Camilla.

Book XII again lists Messapus as one of the captains of the armies, described as "brilliant in gold and purple". He threw a spear at Aeneas, taking the top off his helmet, and enraging him. At the height of the battle, Messapus and Atinas alone held the Rutulian line at the gates of Laurentum. A truce was called for Turnus and Aeneas to fight in single combat, but the Rutulians break the truce. Messapus, eager to stop the duel, charged on horseback towards Etruscan king Aulestes, who tripped and fell onto an altar and pleaded for his life. Messapus stabbed him with his spear, saying "He's had it, this nobler victim given to the mighty gods!"

== Inspiration ==
Virgil adapted a myth from Greek poetry to create Messapus, namely the Greek mythological figure Cycnus, who was a son of Poseidon. Virgil also "borrowed" the property of invulnerability from Cycnus and attributed it to Messapus.
