= Padanian Etruria =

Northern Italy's area in ancient times inhabited by Etruscans

In the 8th century BC, the Etruscans expanded their power to Northern and Southern Italy, specifically towards Emilia and Campania, where they founded Etruscan dominions that are modernly known under the names of Padanian Etruria and Campanian Etruria. Moving from the northern city-states of the Etruscan Dodecapolis they swept into the Po Valley through the Apennine passes.

== History ==
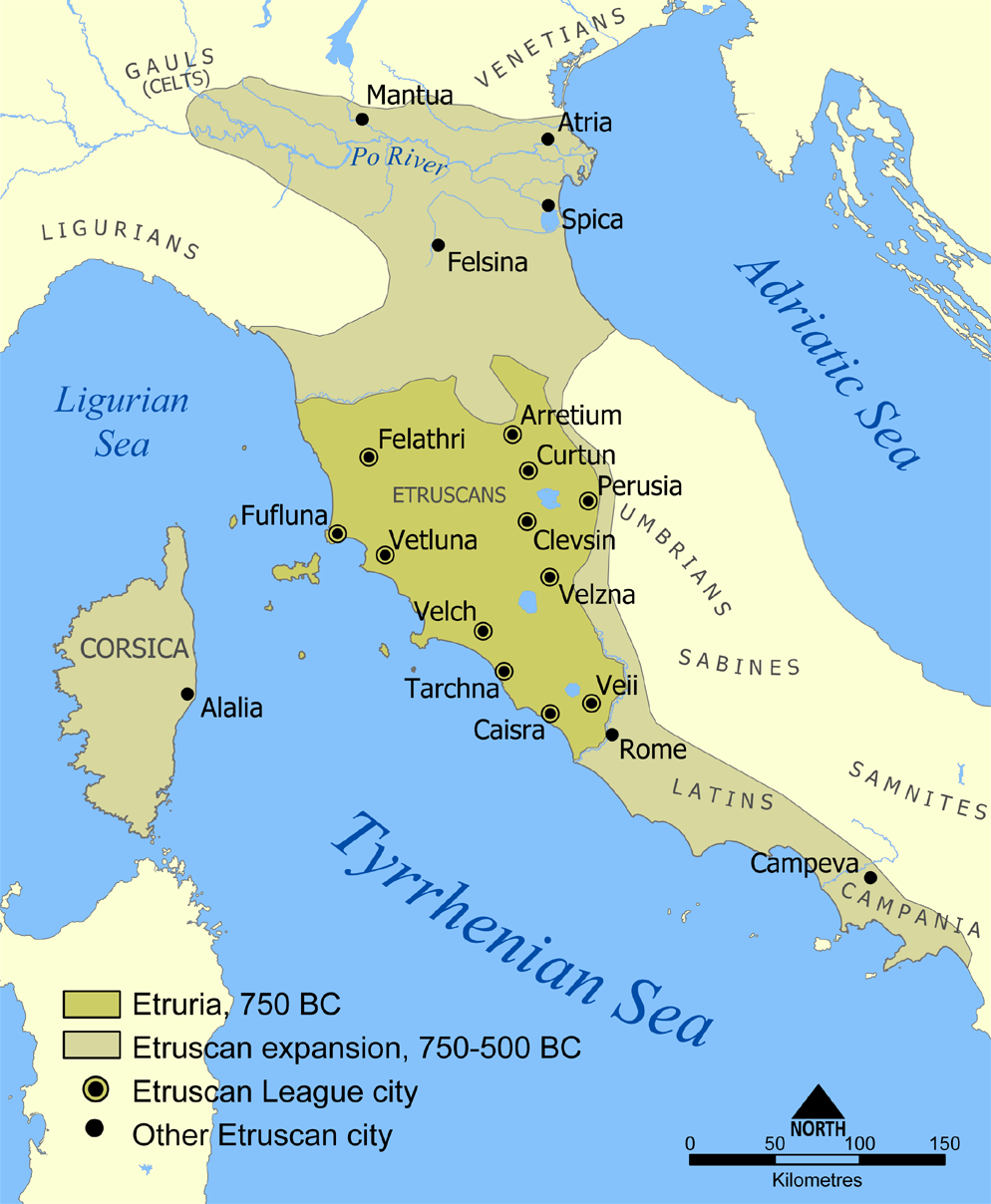
The Etruscan civilization and its expansion (750-500 a.C.).

The Greek and Latin ancient writers tell us that an Etruscan expansion into Southern Italy, the present day region of Campania, and northwards into the Po Valley occurred in the 9th century BCE. However, since Etruscan presence in the area is archeologically attested since the Villanovan culture, the oldest phase of Etruscan civilization, it seems unlikely that the development of Padanian Etruria was part of a colonization process, as it was thought to be in the past, but rather a simultaneous development with Tyrrhenian Etruria.

Consequently, as in Tuscany, the cities they founded in the Po valley and along the Adriatic coast formed a Dodecapolis (a federation or league of twelve cities), but, as for the original Etruscan Dodecapolis, we do not really know which cities were part of it. Inside Padanian Etruria, it is supposed they were Felsina (Bologna), Spina and Marzabotto, while we can only guess about Ravenna, Cesena, Rimini, Modena, Parma, Piacenza, Mantua and possibly, but improbably, Milan.

The founder of these cities and of their League had been Ocnus, brother or son of Aulestes, according some authors, Tarchon according to others. More probably, as the archaeological evidence suggests, both the traditions have to be accepted but must also be ascribed to two different moments of profound change in the political and economic framework of the Padanian Etruria.

A "First etruscan colonization," referred to the legendary Tarchon, can be traced to the early Iron Age (9th century BC). It was aimed to find new lands for agricultural uses; a "Second colonization", dated to the mid-6th century BC, can be attributed to the as much legendary Ocnus. The latter "colonization" involved the reorganization of the entire Padanian region in order to increase its utility for the Etruscan businesses and trades.

During the 6th century BCE Etruria experienced significant social, political and economic transformations. The formative process of the city-states had concluded, within these polities the power of the great aristocratic families was matched and then replaced by that of a new social class of men whose wealth was based mainly on trade.

The protagonists of this process were people of the northern cities of Tuscany. The Padanian Etruria is transformed in best way to serve the new commercial purposes: the trade routes are reinforced and developed, the previous settlements became real cities, better linked amongst them by a closer collaborative relationship, developing in an effective etruscan Dodecapolis.

== The cities of Padanian Etruria ==
From the late 9th century BC, the human settlement in the Lower Po valley, previously organized in small groups of huts scattered throughout the country and mostly inhabited by Umbrians or other Italics, centers in some major urban areas as Bologna, the main city of Padanian Etruria, and Verucchio, then flourishing settlement in the heart of Romagna, by initiative of the etruscan colonists.

=== Felsina (Bologna) ===
The earliest evidence of human settlement in the area of Bologna comes from the 9th century BCE, during the Villanovan period. At that time, small organized settlements began to appear, likely motivated by the Southern Po Valley's fortuitous position in terms of agriculture as well as trade. Over the course of the 8th, 7th and 6th centuries BCE, Felsina underwent a gradual process of urbanization, marked by absorption of smaller nearby settlements and complex city planning, although the sites continuous occupation through the modern period makes mapping its ancient form difficult.

By the 6th century, Felsina, alongside Verucchio, constituted the largest centers of Etruscan influence within the Po Valley. Both acted as economic centers to the smaller settlements within the region. Pliny the Elder even went so far as to record Felsina as the most important of all the Etruscan cities.

=== Verucchio ===
Traces of a 12th-9th century BC settlement, supposed of Villanovan origin, have been found in Verucchio. Later it was an Etruscan possession. The current town derives its name from Vero Occhio ("True Eye"), referring to its privileged position offering a wide panorama of the surrounding countryside and the Romagna coast.

=== Forcello di Bagnolo San Vito ===
In the 6th century BCE there was a reorganization of the Etruscan settlements in the Po valley. Marked as a second period of "colonization", the political and economic restructuring was aimed at pushing Etruscan influence further north, both within Italy and through trade, Northern Europe at large. Part of this reorganization involved the foundation of new settlements in the region. Forcello di Bagnolo San Vito was one of them.

Founded in 540 BCE, the site of Forcello, located north of the Po river, was a major Etruscan settlement in the region. Constructed on the banks of a lake off of the Mincio river, the harbor formed at the site made it an ideal location for inter-Italian trade along both the Mincio and the Po. The site was located at a pivotal point along trade networks between Tyrrhenian and Padanian Etruria, connecting the settlements on the coast of the Adriatic to those further inland. Thus, it was a key point of trade between Etruria and Central Europe, as evidenced by excavations at the site. The site was abandoned in the early 4th century BCE.

=== Mantua ===
A settlement existed as early as around 2000 BC on the banks of the Mincio, on a sort of island which provided natural protection. In the 6th century BC it was an Etruscan village which, in Etruscan tradition, was re-founded by Ocnus. The name derives from the Etruscan god Mantus, of Hades. After being conquered by the Cenomani, a Gallic tribe, the city was conquered between the first and second Punic wars by the Romans, who attributed its name to Manto, a daughter of Tiresias. The new territory was populated by veteran soldiers of Augustus. Mantua's most famous ancient citizen is the poet Publius Vergilius Maro, Virgil (Mantua me genuit), who was born near the city in 70 B.C. at the village now known as Virgilio.

=== Adria ===
The first settlements built on the area are of Venetic origin, during the 12-9th century BC. At that time the main stream of the Po, the Adria channel, flowed into the sea by this area. The Villanovan culture, named for an archaeological site at the village of Villanova, near Bologna (Etruscan Felsina), flourished in this area from the 10th until as late as the 6th century BC. The foundations of classical Atria are dated from 530 to 520 BC.[3] The Etruscans built the port and settlement of Adria after the channel was not the main stream anymore. During the later period of the 6th century BC the port continued to flourish. The Etruscan-controlled area of the Po Valley was generally known as Padanian Etruria (Padanian referring to the Po River), as opposed to their main concentration along the Tyrrhenian coast south of the Arno. Greeks[4] from Aegina[5] and later from Syracuse by Dionysius I colonised the city making it into an emporion. Greeks had been trading with the Eneti from the sixth century BC.[6] Mass Celtic incursions into the Po valley resulted in friction between the Gauls and Etruscans and intermarriage, attested by epigraphic inscriptions on which Etruscan and Celtic names appear together. The city was populated[7] by Etruscans, Eneti, Greeks and Celts.

=== Spina ===
Spina was an Etruscan port city on the Adriatic at the ancient mouth of the Po, south of the lagoon which would become the site of Venice. Spina may have had a Hellenised indigenous population.
