= Fangyi =

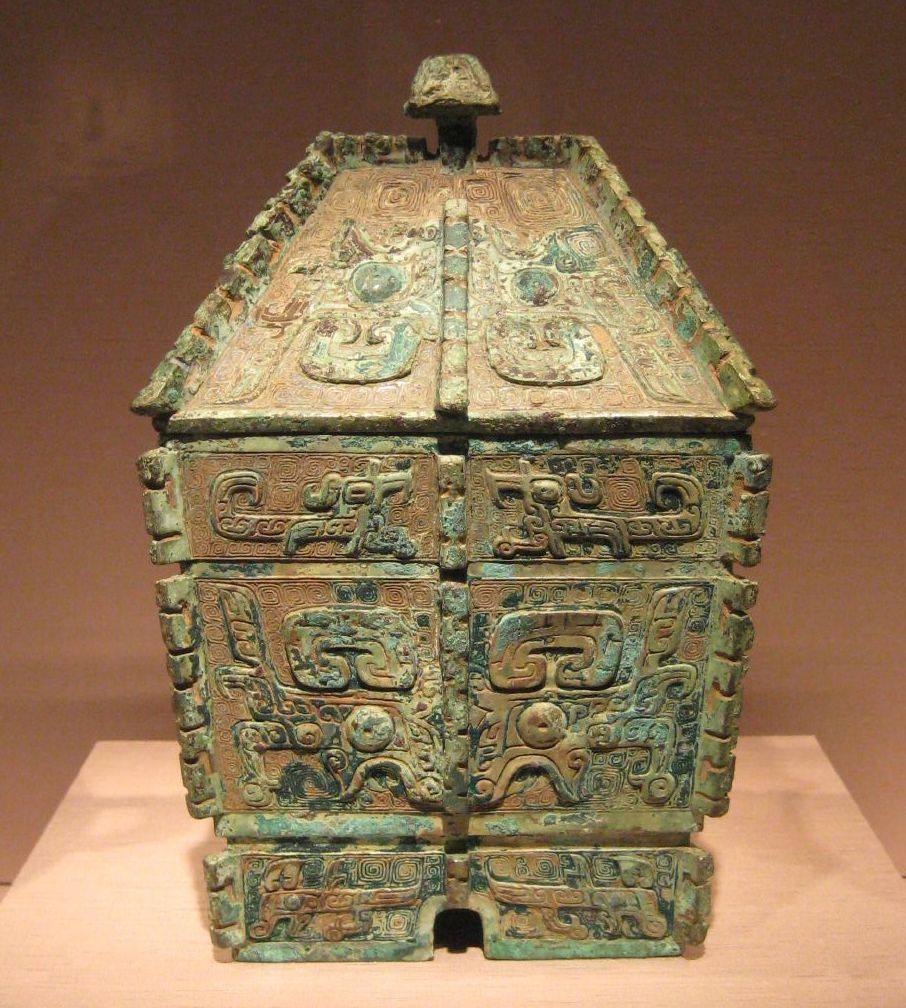
Fangyi dated to the 12th century BCE (Shang dynasty)

A fangyi (Chinese: 方彜; Wade–Giles: fang-i; 'square bronze') is a type of Chinese ritual bronze container typical of the Shang and early to middle Zhou periods of Bronze Age China (circa 1800-900 BCE). It takes the shape of a square or rectangular casket with a cover that resembles a hip roof, surmounted by a knob of a similar hipped appearance. The lower edge is typically indented with a semi-circular notch.

They are usually lavishly decorated, often with taotie patterns representing mythological beasts. They were sometimes connected to create a twin container or oufangyi. Their form differed somewhat over time; those produced during the Shang typically had straight bodies, those of the early Zhou bulge at the sides and mid-Zhou ones have handles that look like an elephant's trunk. The Sinologist Carl Hentze suggested that the shape of the vessel represents an ancestral temple of the period, with sloping roofs, projecting beams and a square or rectangular base.

Fangyi appear to have evolved from pottery vessels in the Neolithic period and were also carved from white marble during the Shang. They first appeared in bronze either at the start of the Yinxu period (13th-11th century BC) or during the 14th century transition between the Erligang culture and the Yinxu. They disappeared in the middle part of the Western Zhou period.

They are believed to have been used to hold ritual food offerings, though it is also possible that they could have been used to hold wine. During the Shang and Zhou eras, kings and aristocrats customarily sought to bring good fortune and avert evil by sacrificing to the ancestors. They were used both in life and as grave goods, and have been found in tombs such as that of the 13th century BC queen Fu Hao.

Many fangyi were inscribed with very early forms of Chinese writing, generally representing the names of the owners of the vessels or the ancestors to whom they were dedicated. The inscriptions usually appear on the interior walls or floors of the vessels and on the undersides of the lids. They were cast into the bronze rather than being incised into the metal. The highly pictographic form of the shorter Shang-era inscriptions later developed into lengthier inscriptions by the time of the Zhou, with more standardised written characters often commemorating events involving the individual who had commissioned the vessel. Fangyi thus represent an important source for ancient Chinese history and the development of the Chinese writing system.
