= Ying (state) =

c. 1030–646 BC Chinese state in Henan

Ying 應
- c. 1030–646 BCE
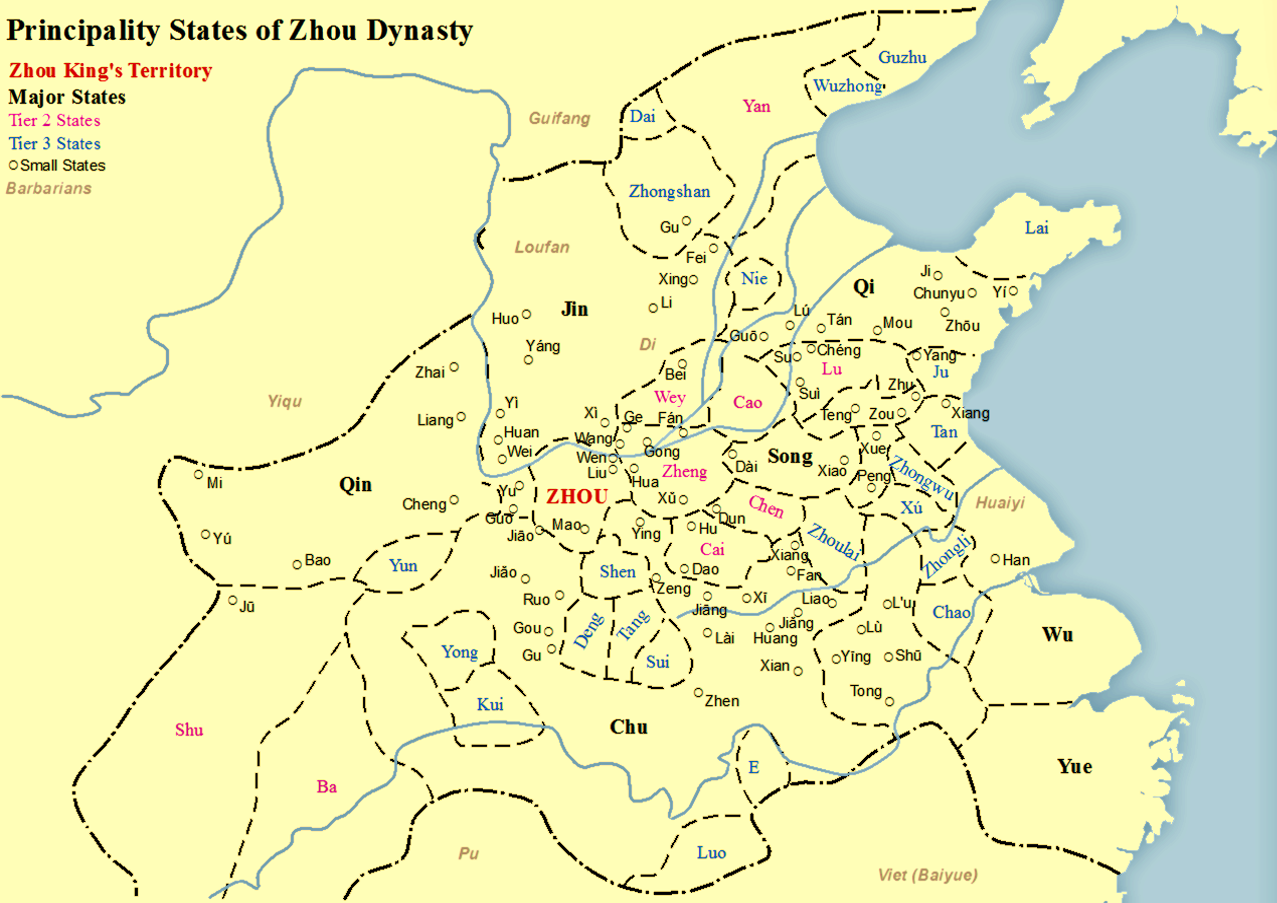
- Ying 應 is located to the north of Chu and southeast of Zhou; it is not to be confused with Ying 英, a different state to the east of Chu.
- Status: Vassal state
- Capital: Pingdingshan
- Common languages: Old Chinese
- Religion: Chinese folk religion Ancestor veneration
- Government: Monarchy
- Historical era: Zhou dynasty
  - Established: c. 1030 BCE
  - Disestablished: 646 BCE
- Today part of: China

Ying (traditional Chinese: 應; simplified Chinese: 应; pinyin: Yīng) was a vassal state in eastern China that existed from c. 1030 to 646 BCE. After the fall of the Western Zhou, it continued into the Spring and Autumn period, briefly becoming a vassal state of Chu in the 650s BCE, but was ultimately annexed by the Chu in 646 BCE. Ying was in modern-day Pingdingshan, Henan province, where many artifacts such as bronze vessels from the state have been unearthed.

== History ==
The state of Ying was founded around 1030 BCE by Ying Hou, a younger brother of King Cheng of Zhou.

=== Partial list of rulers ===
- 1. Ying Hou (應侯) younger brother of King Cheng of Zhou
- 2. Ying Hou Xiangong (應侯見工), son of Ying Hou

(Unknown intermediary king[s])

- Ying Ligong (or Xigong, 應釐公)

(Unknown intermediary king[s])

- Ying Houcheng (應侯爯)

(Unknown later king[s])

== See also ==
- Warring States period
