= Aulestes =

Founder of Perusia

Aulestes was a Tyrrhenian ally of the mythical Aeneas. In some accounts, he was the son of Tiberis and Manto, and the brother of Ocnus. He was slain by Messapus, and was said to have founded Perusia.
