= Ocnus =

Mythic Greek figure personifying hesitation

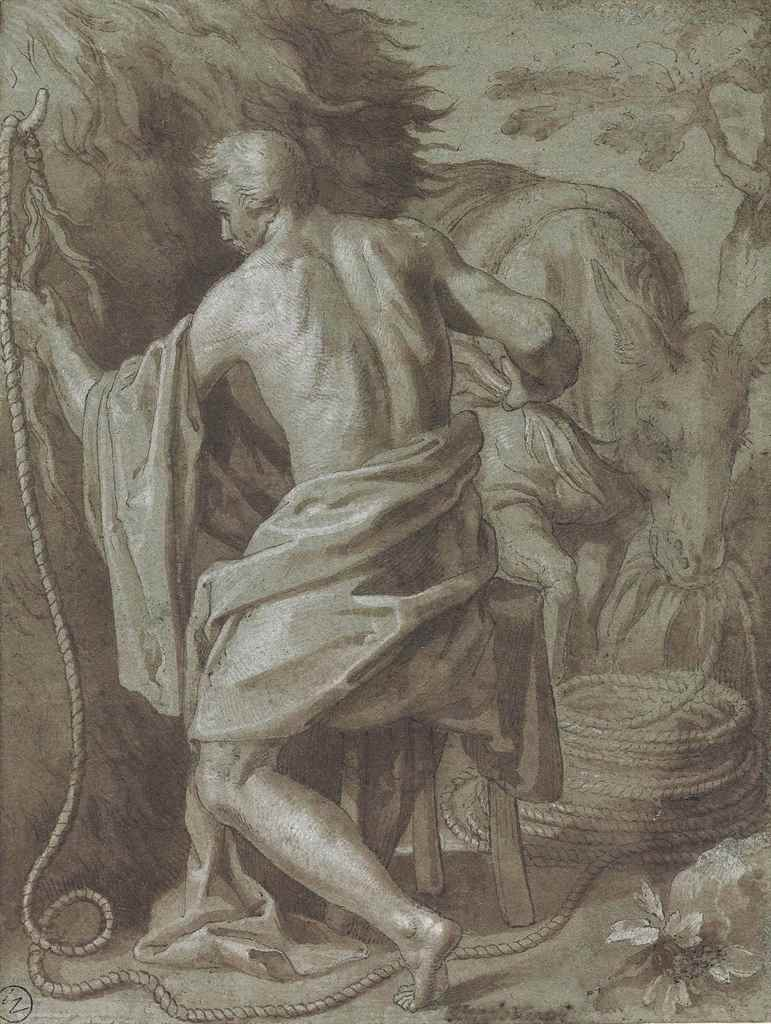
Ocnus by J. Ligozzi (circa 1547-circa 1627)

In Greek and Roman mythology, Ocnus /ˈɒknəs/ (Ancient Greek: Ὄκνος) or Bianor /baɪˈeɪnər/ (Ancient Greek: Βιάνωρ) was a son of Manto and Tiberinus Silvius, king of Alba Longa. He founded modern Mantua in honor of his mother. Alternatively, he was the son or brother of Aulestes and founded Felsina (modern Bologna), Perusia or Cesena.

Because of the association of his name with the Greek verb ὀκνέω (oknéō) 'I shrink from, hesitate', Ocnus is a character or allegorical deity which personifies hesitation, frustration, delay and the wasting of time, thus symbolising the vicissitudes of human life consumed in unsuccessful efforts.

== Mythology ==
He was condemned to spend eternity in Tartarus, weaving a rope of straw. As depicted in the picture by Polygnotos, standing behind him is his donkey which eats the rope as fast as it is made.

Unlike as it is the case with other inmates of Tartarus, there is no crime mentioned which would explain Ocnus's condition. The classical philologist and epigraphist Reinhold Merkelbach suggests that this is the case because Ocnus had been "tardy" in seeking initiation in the Eleusinian Mysteries, but there is no direct evidence for this in the surviving literary resources. The classical philologist Ulrich von Wilamowitz-Moellendorff regards Ocnus's condition as a punishment for moral weakness, lack of courage, and shyness towards what he conceives as obligation to make up his mind. According to Wilamowitz, this might have good effects if it keeps away from evil deeds, but is egoistic because the avoidance of obstacles which require a decision to act basically helps no one. The philosopher Norbert Wokart however rejects this notion, and deems Ocnus to be just a picture or mere symbol, which allegorically shows the creative and destructive, and abstractly the fragile balance between the positive and the negative, because the positive would only become positive through the contrast of the negative.

Julius Evola, an Italian esotericist, posits the story as a symbolic representation of the birth and death of man as a form of incidental immortality, circumventing the individual. Here, Evola sees Ocnus as the eternal-mother, weaving the unending rope of humanity down into the mouth of the donkey, which symbolizes death.
