= Xing (state) =

Ancient Chinese state (11th century–632 BCE)

State of Xing 邢國
- 11th century BCE–632 BCE
- Capital: Xingtai City, (邢台市) Hebei Province
- Government: Marquess (侯爵)
- History
  - Established: 11th century BCE
  - Disestablished: 635 BCE
Succeeded by
Jin (Chinese state); Wey (state)

Xíng was a vassal state of ancient China during the Zhou dynasty (1046–221 BCE) and Spring and Autumn period (770–475 BCE), ruled by members of the Jī family (姬). Its original location was on the plain east of the Shanxi plateau and north of most of the other states.

== History ==
Sometime between 1046 and 1043 BCE, King Wu of Zhou granted lands around modern day Xingtai City to Pengshu of Xing (邢朋叔), who was the fourth son of the Duke of Zhou. Shortly after Xing's establishment, Pengshu travelled to the Zhou capital of Haojing. Pengshu performed ceremonial rituals with the king and was then bestowed gifts before returning home. In 662 BCE, Xing was heavily threatened by the Red Di tribes. Duke Huan of Qi relocated Xing southeast to a place known as Yiyi (夷仪) (modern day Liaocheng City, Shandong). In 635 BCE, during the rule of Marquess Yuan of Xing, the State of Xing was wiped out by the State of Wey.

In 1978, a gui was discovered 70 kilometers north of Xingtai which mentioned a battle fought between Xing and a nearby Rong tribe. A later find in 1988 in Pingdingshan possibly records a diplomatic interaction between the states of Xing and Ying, though this is disputed.
