= Han (NW Zhou state) =

Ancient Chinese state under the Zhou dynasty

- Traditional Chinese: 韓國
- Simplified Chinese: 韩国
Transcriptions
Standard Mandarin
- Hanyu Pinyin: Hánguó
- Wade–Giles: Han-kuo

Han was a minor Chinese state under the Zhou dynasty. It was centered on present-day Hancheng in Shaanxi and Hejin in Shanxi. The state was created for a son—known only as the "Marquess of Han" (韓侯)—of the King Wu of Zhou in the 11th century BC. The rulers held the rank of marquess and ancestral name of Ji (姬). Han was conquered by the Jin and enfeoffed to Wuzi of Han, a descendant of the Marquis Mu of Jin, in the 8th century BC.

== See also ==
- Han (SE Zhou state)
- Han (disambiguation)
