= Shěn (state) =

Shen 沈
- Early Zhou dynasty–c. 500 BCE
- Capital: Shěn (沈), modern-day Linquan County
- Common languages: Chinese language
- Religion: Chinese folk religion, ancestor worship
- Government: Earldom, Marquessate
- Historical era: Zhou dynasty, Spring and Autumn period
  - Established: Early Zhou dynasty
  - Disestablished: c. 500 BCE

Shen (Chinese: 沈; pinyin: Shěn) was a vassal state during the Zhou dynasty and the Spring and Autumn period located in modern-day Henan. Its founder is unknown, although a possible founder was one of the sons of King Wen of Zhou. When writing about the origin of the surname Shen in the New Book of Tang, it is said that the state of Shen was established by Dan Shu Ji, a son of King Wen of Zhou.

== History ==
The Shěn state came into being around 1050 BCE. The Chronicle of Zuo, a commentary of the Spring and Autumn period, mentions this state in its writing. But the Shěn state's history stretches beyond this period. The same chronicle mentions another ancient Shěn state, located in Northern China, which was established before the foundation of the Zhou dynasty. This ancient state may be related to the one founded in the 11th century BCE, but it is unlikely. It is more likely that the state originated as an earldom created during the Zhou dynasty in order to secure peace and order around neighbouring areas.

The course of this state's history is vastly unknown. There has been no record of Shěn participating in any major events during its history. It was only a small state, and hence may have been viewed as not worthy of regard by writers and historians of the time. However, despite its limited territory, the state managed to survive until the late Spring and Autumn period.

There have been several artefacts found which are potentially related to Shěn, including evidence of the tenth son of the King Wen of Zhou being the founder of the state. However, various archaeologists have different opinions as to whether the artefacts are genuinely products of the Shěn state and whether they truly reveal the founder of Shěn.

== End ==
The exact date of the cessation of the state is unknown. However, it is known that the State of Cai defeated Shěn at around 500 BCE before the Battle of Boju. (Some Shěn leaders managed to escape to the State of Chu.) The state of Shěn never revived, and the name "Shěn" was not used in any other state's name thereafter.

== Legacy ==
According to the story of Shěn Ruì (沈汭), during the Warring States period some of the descendants of Shěn royals have settled in the State of Yan, and later dispersed to Southern China to the territories of the Baiyue. Note that Shěn descendants in Southern China, namely Guangdong and Guangxi, do not carry the surname Shěn (沈), but Xiǎn/Sin (冼). This is because, according to legend, Shěn Ruì was suspected of being involved in an assassination plot against the Qin emperor. He therefore had no option but to escape to the Southern territories of China, which a friend from his youth, Zhào Tuō, had control over. Zhao Tuo later founded the Nanyue kingdom. Shěn Ruì then married a local female Baiyue chieftain. To avoid being detected and to make a new start for his new family clan, Shěn Ruì changed his surname to Xiǎn/Sin (冼), a mixture of the characters "沈", Shěn's surname, and "先", meaning first. Seeing that Shěn Ruì has the intention to stay in Nanyue, Zhao Tuo gave he and his descendants Gāo liáng jùn (高涼郡), modern-day Yangjiang, to govern over. As a result, the surname of Xiǎn/Sin is found most commonly in Southern China.

== See also ==
- Zhou dynasty
- Spring and Autumn period
- State of Cai

== Sources ==
- 杨伯峻 (1990). Chun qiu Zuo zhuan zhu 春秋左传注 (in Chinese). 中华书局. ISBN 7-101-00262-5.
- 许倬云 (2001). 西周史 (in Chinese). 生活・讀書・新知三联书店. ISBN 7-108-01521-8.
