= Teng (state) =

Ancient small Chinese state (1046–414 BC)

Teng 滕
- 1046 BCE–297 BCE
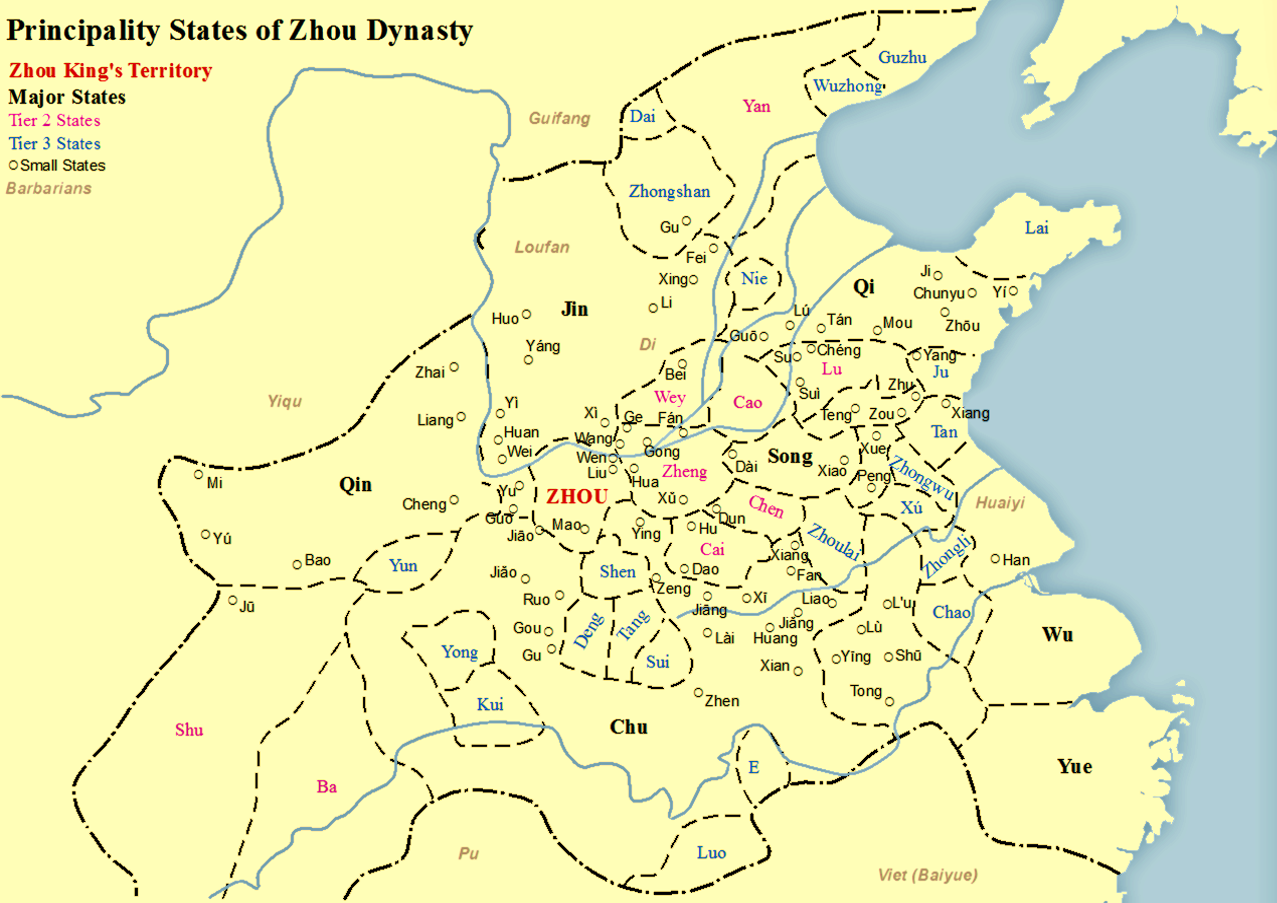
- Teng is a small state in the east, near Qi and Lu
- Capital: Tengzhou
- Common languages: Old Chinese
- Government: Viscounty (子)
- Historical era: Western Zhou period Spring and Autumn period
  - Established: 1046 BCE
  - Conquered by Yue: 414 BCE
  - Conquered by Song: 297 BCE

Teng
- "Teng" in seal script
- Chinese: 滕
Transcriptions
Standard Mandarin
- Hanyu Pinyin: Téng
- IPA: [tʰə̌ŋ]

Teng (Chinese: 滕; pinyin: Téng; 1046–414 BC) was a minor Chinese vassal state that existed during the Spring and Autumn period and the Warring States period, located in the south of modern-day Shandong province. Its territory corresponds to the present-day county-level city of Tengzhou.

Teng's ruling family was the Ji family, with the founder, Shu Xiu of Cuo (錯叔繡), being the 14th brother of King Wu of Zhou. It was conquered and annexed by the Yue state during the reign of Goujian.

Teng was a vassal of the Lu state, and is famed as the birthplace of the Chinese philosopher Mozi and architect Lu Ban. The name of the state survives in both the city of Tengzhou and the Chinese clan name of Teng (滕).

It was conquered by King Zhugou (朱勾) of the Yue state. Then its nobility re-established the country. Finally it was annihilated by King Kang of Song in 297 BC.
