= Asmaka kingdom =

Aśmaka (Skt. अश्मक), or Pali Assaka, was a kingdom among the 16 Mahajanapadas mentioned in Buddhist literature, in inscriptions including the Ajāntā Caves, and in Sanskrit epic and Purānic literature. All other kingdoms were in the north, from Anga to Gandhara. An alternative theory states that Asmaka was not an independent southern kingdom, but referred instead to Asvaka—a nation in the north ruled by the Kambojas. The epic Mahabharata mentions that the king of the name Asmaka was the adopted son of Saudasa a king of Kosala and an Ikshwaku ruler.

== References in the Mahābhārata ==
=== Asmaka the adopted son of Saudasa ===
Madayanti, the wife of Saudasa, commanded by her husband to raise offspring went unto Rishi Vasishtha. And on going in unto him, the beautiful Madayanti obtained a son named Asmaka. (1,122).

This history is repeated at (1,197), where it adds that the queen bore the embryo in her womb for a long time. She being impatient upon her pregnancy, hit her stomach by stone (Aśman, अश्मन्, in Sanskrit), hence the son thus born was named Asmaka. He became a great king and founded the city of Paudanya.

=== Asmakas in Kurukshetra War ===
==== On Pandava side ====
Asmakas were mentioned to be on the side of Pandavas, with Dhristadyumna, at (7.83)

==== On Kaurava side ====
Borne by his well-broken steeds Abhimanyu quickly checked the son of Asmaka. Staying before him, the handsome son of Asmaka pierced him with ten shafts and addressing him, said, ‘Wait, Wait.’ Abhimanyu then, with ten shafts, cut off the former’s steeds and charioteer and standard and two arms and bow and head, and caused them to fall down on the earth, smiling the while. After the heroic ruler of the Asmakas had thus been slain by the son of Subhadra, the whole of his force wavered and began to fly away from the field. (7,35)

=== Karna's conquests ===
Dhritarashtra talks of Karna having conquered the mighty foes----the Gandharas, the Madrakas, the Matsyas, the Trigartas, the Tanganas, the Khasas, the Pancalas, the Videhas, the Kulindas, the Kasi-kosalas, the Suhmas, the Angas, the Nishadhas, the Pundras, the Kichakas, the Vatsas, the Kalingas, the Taralas, the Asmakas, and the Rishikas (i.e. south-western Rishikas located in Maharashtra) (8.8) and numerous other tribes including the Kaikeyas, Kambojas, Ambasthas and Videhas, etc.

=== Asmaka Sumantu, a sage ===
Asmaka Sumantu was a sage among the sages who assembled in Kurukshetra, during the last days of Kuru hero Bhishma. (12,47)

== See also ==
- Assaka
- Kingdoms of Ancient India

== Sources ==
- Mahabharata of Krishna Dwaipayana Vyasa, translated to English by Kisari Mohan Ganguli
