= Song (state) =

Feudal state in the Zhou dynasty, China

Song 宋
- 11th century BC–286 BC
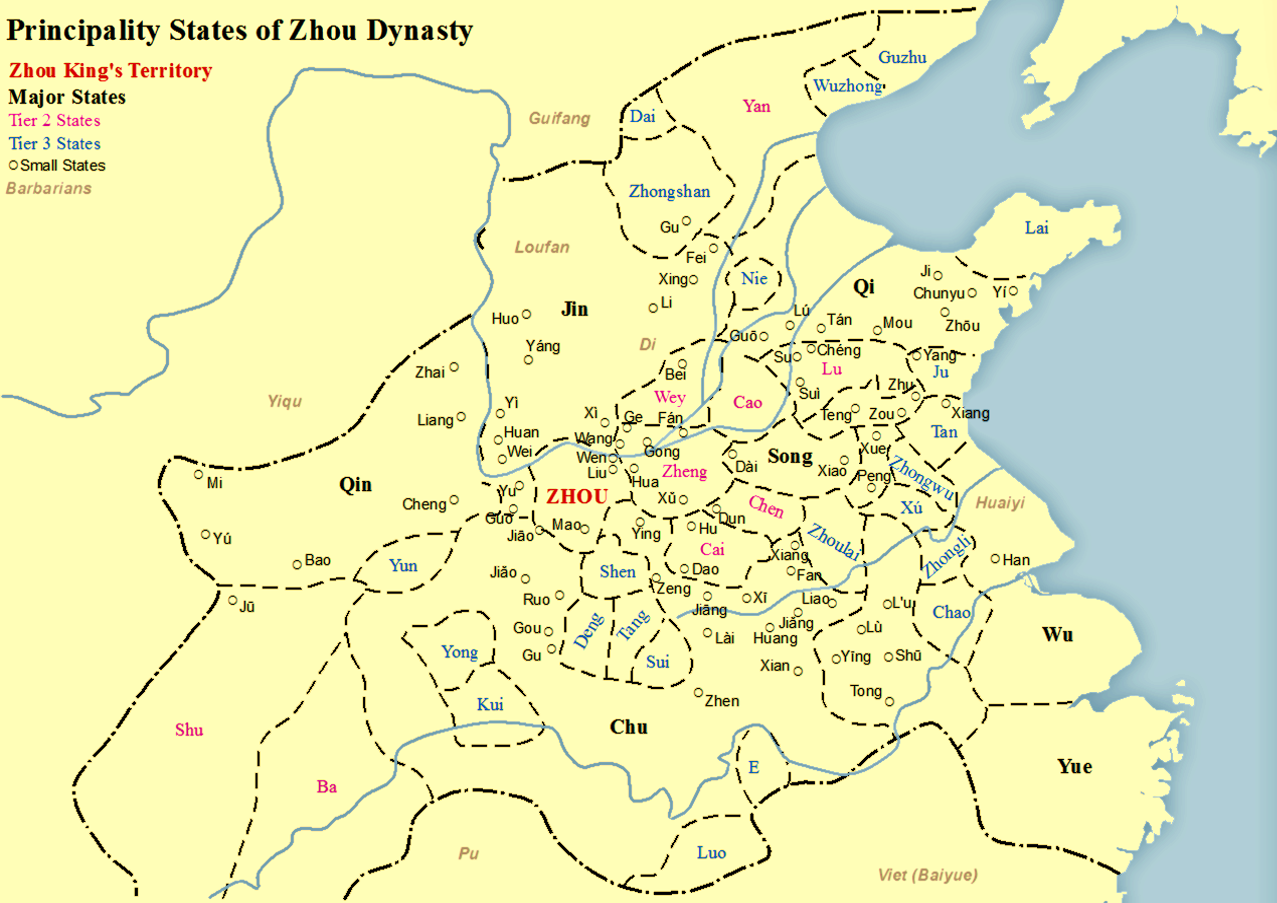
- Map of Zhou dynasty states, including Song
- Status: State
- Capital: Shangqiu (商丘)
- Religion: Chinese folk religion, ancestor worship, Taoism
- Government: Monarchy
- History
  - Established: 11th century BC
  - Conquered by Qi: 286 BC
- Currency: Chinese coin
Succeeded by
Qi (state)

Song
- "Song" in ancient seal script (top) and modern regular (bottom) Chinese characters
- Chinese: 宋
Transcriptions
Standard Mandarin
- Hanyu Pinyin: Sòng
- Gwoyeu Romatzyh: Sonq
- Wade–Giles: Sung^{4}
- IPA: [sʊ̂ŋ]
Yue: Cantonese
- Yale Romanization: Sung
- Jyutping: Sung3
- IPA: [sʊŋ˧]
Southern Min
- Tâi-lô: Sòng
Old Chinese
- Baxter–Sagart (2014): *[s]ˤuŋ-s

Chinese states in the 5th century BC

Song was an ancient Chinese state during the Zhou dynasty with its capital at Shangqiu. The state was founded soon after King Wu of Zhou conquered the Shang dynasty to establish the Zhou dynasty in 1046 BC. It was conquered by the state of Qi in 286 BC, during the Warring States period. Confucius is traditionally considered to have been a descendant of a Song nobleman who moved to the state of Lu.

== Origin ==
Di Xin was the younger brother of Zi Qi—who was said in legends to have ruled Gija Joseon in the 11th century BCE—and Zi Yan (子衍), later rulers of Zhou's vassal state Song, father of Wu Geng.

After King Wu of Zhou overthrew the last ruler of Shang, marking the transition to the Zhou dynasty, the victor was honor-bound by a stricture of feudal etiquette known as Er Wang San Ke (二王三恪) to allow the defeated house of Shang to continue offering sacrifices to their ancestors. As a result, for a time Shang became a vassal state of Zhou, with the Shang heir Wu Geng allowed to continue ancestor worship at Yin.

However, after King Wu's death, Wu Geng fomented a rebellion with an alliance of eastern states, and was killed by the Duke of Zhou. Another Shang royal family descendant, Weizi, was granted land at Shangqiu, the 'hill of Shang', where the capital of the new state of Song was built.

A sign of its descent from the Shang is that the state of Song in its early period followed the succession principle of agnatic seniority, rather than agnatic primogeniture like the Zhou.

== History ==
In 701 BC, a political marriage between Lady Yong of Song (宋雍氏) and Duke Zhuang of Zheng—as well as the capture of Zhai Zhong (祭仲), a leading warrior—empowered Song to manipulate the administration of Zheng.

In 651, Duke Huan of Song (宋桓公) died, leaving the state to be ruled by Duke Xiang, who reigned from 651 to 637. He was considered a hegemon by some, but was unable to maintain that role. He eventually fell to the troops of Chu.

In 355, Dai Ticheng (戴剔成), a distant relative of the ruling royal line and once a minister of Duke Huan II, managed to usurp the throne. In 328, Dai Yan, a younger brother of Ticheng, took the throne and declared himself to be King Kang of Song, with Ticheng murdered or exiled. The king was ambitious and had succeeded in beating troops from Chu, Wei and Qi and annexing Teng. However, the kingdom was finally annexed by Qi in 286, with troops from Chu and Wei serving on behalf of Qi. Qin, which had been an ally of Song, refused to intervene for strategic and diplomatic reasons after being convinced by Su Dai from Wei. Su's predictions were proven correct and Qin benefited from the downfall of its former ally.

The philosopher Mozi references this state in the chapter "Obvious Existence of Ghosts", in which he mentions a number of Spring and Autumn Annals, including those of the Zhou, Yan, and Qi. The Spring and Autumn Annals of Song has not survived.

== Rulers ==
Unless otherwise indicated, the ruler is the son of his predecessor.

1. Weizi (Qi 啟), brother of the last king of Shang, Di Xin
2. Weizhong 微仲 (Yan 衍), younger brother of the above
3. Ji, Duke of Song 宋公稽
4. Duke Ding 宋丁公 (Shen 申)
5. Duke Min I 宋湣公 (Gong 共), alleged ancestor of Confucius
6. Duke Yang 宋煬公 (Xi 熙), younger brother of the above
7. Duke Li 宋厲公 (Fusi 鮒祀), son of Duke Min I
8. Duke Xi 宋僖公 (Ju 舉), 859–831
9. Duke Hui 宋惠公 (Jian 覵), 830–800
10. Duke Ai 宋哀公, 799
11. Duke Dai 宋戴公, 799–766
12. Duke Wu 宋武公 (Sikong 司空), 765–748
13. Duke Xuan 宋宣公 (Li 力), 747–729
14. Duke Mu 宋穆公 (He 和), 728–720, younger brother of the above
15. Duke Shang 宋殤公 (Yuyi 與夷), 719–711
16. Duke Zhuang 宋莊公 (Feng 馮), 710–692
17. Duke Min II 宋閔公 (Jie 捷), 691–682
18. You, Duke of Song 宋公游, assassinated less than 3 months after accession.
19. Duke Huan I 宋桓公 (Yuyue 御說), 681–651, younger brother of Duke Min II
20. Duke Xiang (Zifu 茲父), 650–637
21. Duke Cheng 宋成公 (Wangchen 王臣), 636–620
22. Yu, Duke of Song 宋公禦, younger brother of the above, assassinated less than one month after accession.
23. Duke Zhao I 宋昭公 (Chujiu 杵臼), 619–611, son of Duke Cheng
24. Duke Wen 宋文公 (Bao 鮑), 610–589, younger brother of the above
25. Duke Gong 宋共公 (Xia 瑕), 588–576
26. Duke Ping 宋平公 (Cheng 成), 575–532
27. Duke Yuan 宋元公 (Zuo 佐), 531–517
28. Duke Jing 宋景公 (Touman 頭曼), 516–451
29. Duke Zhao II 宋昭公 (De 得), 450–404, great-grandson of Duke Yuan; possibly 468–404, making him one of the longest-reigning monarchs.
30. Duke Dao 宋悼公 (Gouyou 購由), 403–396
31. Duke Xiu 宋休公 (Tian 田), 395–373
32. Duke Huan II 宋桓公 (Bibing 辟兵), 372–370
33. Lord Ticheng of Song 宋剔成君, 369–329, descendant of the 11th duke, Dai
34. Yan, King of Song 宋王偃, King Kang 宋康王, 328–286, younger brother of the above

=== Family tree ===
Song state

^{(1)} Weizi 微子啟	^{(2)} Weizhong 微仲
□	^{(3)} Ji 宋公稽
腯	^{(4)} Duke Ding 宋丁公
^{(5)} Duke Min I 宋湣公	^{(6)} Duke Yang 宋炀公
弗父何	^{(7)} Duke Li 宋厉公
^{(8)} Duke Xi 宋僖公 ?-859-831BC
^{(9)} Duke Hui 宋惠公 ?-831-801BC
^{(10)} Duke Ai 宋哀公 ?-801-800BC
^{(11)} Duke Dai 宋戴公 ?-800-766BC
^{(12)} Duke Wu 宋武公 ?-766-748BC	好父说	乐父衎	皇父充石	□ 老氏
^{(13)} Duke Xuan 宋宣公 ?-748-729BC	^{(14)} Duke Mu 宋穆公 ?-729-720BC	华父督
^{(15)} Duke Shang 宋殇公 ?-720-710BC	^{(16)} Duke Zhuang 宋庄公 ?-710-692BC	左师勃
^{(18)} Ziyou 子游 ?-682BC	^{(17)} Duke Min II 宋闵公 ?-692-682BC	^{(19)} Duke Huan I 宋桓公 ?-682-651BC	右师戊 仲氏	公子成	□
子鱼	^{(20)} Duke Xiang 宋襄公 ?-651-637BC	公子荡	公子鳞	向父肹	公孙固 ?-620BC
^{(21)} Duke Cheng 宋成公 ?-637-620BC	^{(22)} Yu 禦 ?-620BC	□	□
^{(23)} Duke Zhao I 宋昭公 ?-620-611BC	^{(24)} Duke Wen 宋文公 ?-611-589BC	公子卬 ?-619BC	母弟须 ?-609BC	孔叔 ?-619BC	公孙钟离 ?-619BC
^{(25)} Duke Gong 宋共公 ?-589-576BC	公子围龟 灵氏 ?-586BC	公子肥 ?-576BC
^{(26)} Duke Ping 宋平公 ?-576-532BC	褚师段 石氏
太子痤 ?-547BC	^{(27)} Duke Yuan 宋元公 ?-532-517BC	公子城	公子御戎 边氏 ?-522BC
^{(28)} Duke Jing 宋景公 ?-517-469BC	公子地	母弟辰	公子褍秦
公孙周
^{(30)} Duke Zhao II 宋昭公 ?-469-404BC	^{(29)} Qi 启 ?-469BC-?
^{(31)} Duke Dao 宋悼公 ?-404-385BC	^{(34)} Lord Ticheng 宋剔成君 ?-356-329-?	^{(35)} Yan 宋康王 ?-329-286BC-?
^{(32)} Duke Xiu 宋休公 ?-385-363BC
^{(33)} Duke Huan II 宋桓公 ?-363-356BC

== Descendants ==
Confucius is traditionally considered to have been a descendant of the Dukes of Song. His descendants hold the honorary title Duke Yansheng.

The title of Duke of Song and "Duke Who Continues and Honours the Yin" (殷紹嘉公) were bestowed upon Kong An by the Eastern Han dynasty because he was part of the Shang dynasty's legacy. This branch of the Kong family is a separate branch from the line that held the title of Marquis of Fengsheng village and later Duke Yansheng.

== Song in astronomy ==
Song is represented by the star Eta Ophiuchi in the asterism Left Wall, Heavenly Market enclosure (see Chinese constellation).

== See also ==
- Marquis of Extended Grace
- Songzhou
