= Quan (state) =

Ancient Chinese state

Quan 權
- Unknown–704 BC
- Status: Duchy
- Capital: South east of Dangyang Hubei Province
- Religion: Chinese folk religion, ancestor worship, Taoism
- Government: Monarchy
- History
  - Established: Unknown
  - Disestablished: 704 BC
- Currency: Chinese coin, gold coins
Preceded by	Succeeded by
Zhou dynasty; Warring States period	Chu (state); Qin dynasty

Quan (Chinese: 權) was a small Zhou dynasty (1046–256 BC) vassal state in Central China. A marquisate, then dukedom (侯), its rulers were descendants of Shang dynasty (c. 1600–1046 BC) ruler Wu Ding with the surname Zi (子). Quan was founded by Wen Ding’s son Quan Wending (权文丁) in the area of modern-day Maliang Town (马良镇), Shayang County, Jingmen City, Hubei Province, next to what would later emerge as the State of Chu.

== History ==
During the Xia (c. 2070–1600 BC) and Shang Dynasties, China was divided into the Nine Provinces at which time Jingmen City was classified as part of Jingzhou.
In the 11th century BC, the Duke of Zhou received orders from King Cheng of Zhou to announce an edict concerning descendants of the royal Ji (姬) family. They were given land in the Shihui Bridge (拾回桥) area of Shayang County where they established the State of Ran (冉国), also known as the State of Na (那国) and the State of Quan. The initial ruler of Quan was given the title “First Duke of Quan” (权甲公 pinyin: Quán Jiǎ Gōng). The history of both Ran and Quan during the Western Zhou dynasty (1066–771 BC) is not recorded.
At the beginning of the Spring and Autumn period (771 BC), Chu's power was in the ascendant and the state gradually expanded southwards. Chu rulers Xiong E (熊鄂) and Ruo’Ao (若敖) (799–764 BC) were anxious to expand southwards but this would require the overthrow of the State of Ran and bring the Zhou court onto the doorstep of Chu.

During the reign of King Huan of Zhou, in 704 BC, King Wu of Chu attacked the State of Sui at the Battle of Suqi near modern-day Suizhou (速杞之战). This was only one part of the Kings military campaign, and he subsequently invaded Quan, overthrowing its 22nd generation leader with the surname Zi, Duke Gui of Quan (权归公). Thereafter, King Wu established a county within Quan's former borders and installed his minister Dou Min (斗缗) as magistrate.
