= Eastern Guo =

東虢/东虢
- ?–767 BCE
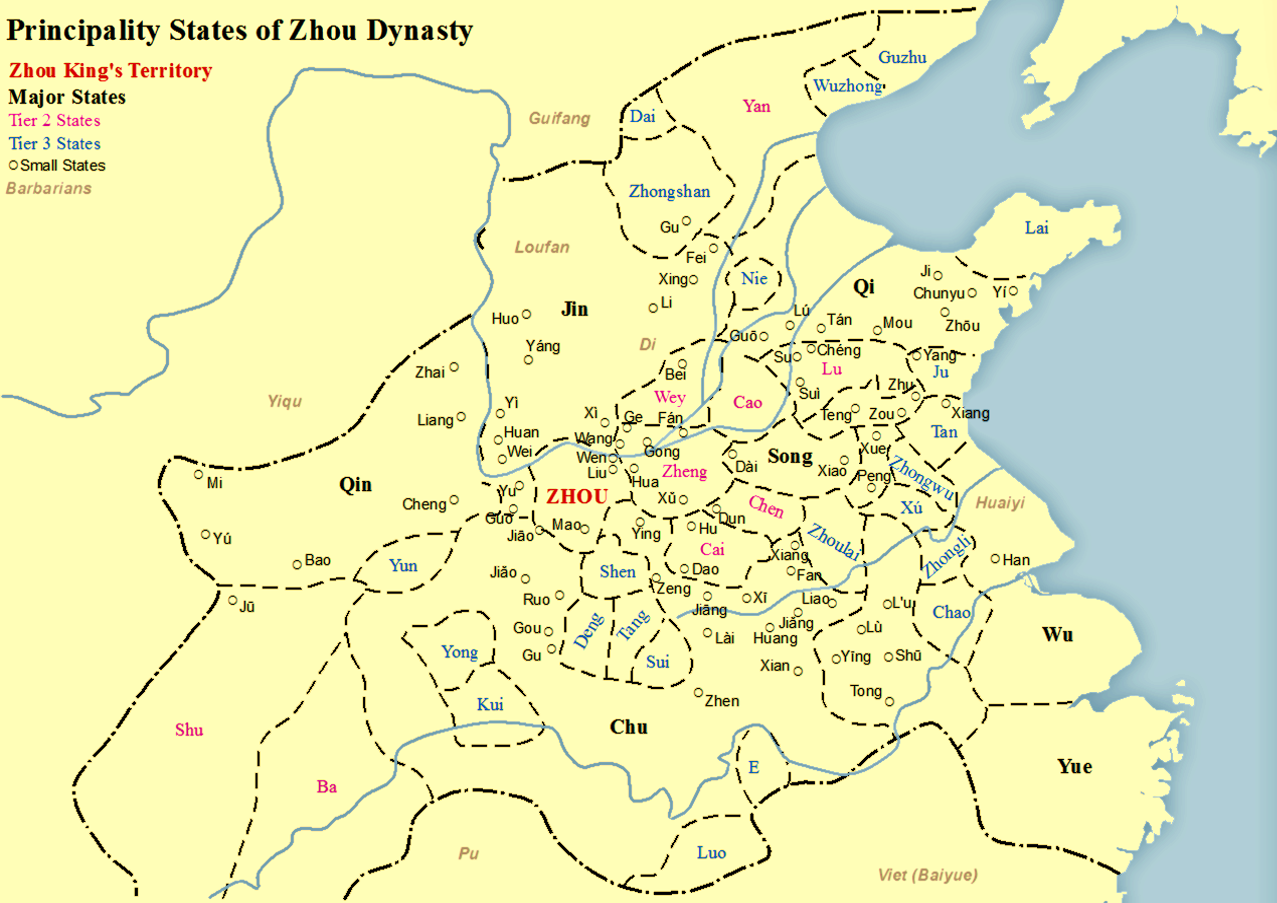
- Eastern Guo and Western Guo are shown as Guo
- Government: Monarchy
- History
  - Established: ?
  - Disestablished: 767 BCE

Eastern Guo (simplified Chinese: 东虢; traditional Chinese: 東虢; pinyin: Dōng Guó) was a Chinese vassal state of the Western Zhou dynasty (1046–770 BCE).

According to transmitted ancient texts, after King Wu of Zhou destroyed the Shang dynasty in 1046 BCE, his two uncles received grants of land. One, known as the Western Guo was at Yongdi and the other, Eastern Guo, at Zhidi (制地) (modern day Xingyang, Henan). However, this account has been questioned by modern scholars such as Li Feng, who believe that Eastern Guo was founded later by a subbranch of Western Guo.

Eastern Guo barely survived into the Spring and Autumn period (770–475 BCE). It was conquered by the State of Zheng in 767 BCE.
