= Bit-Istar =

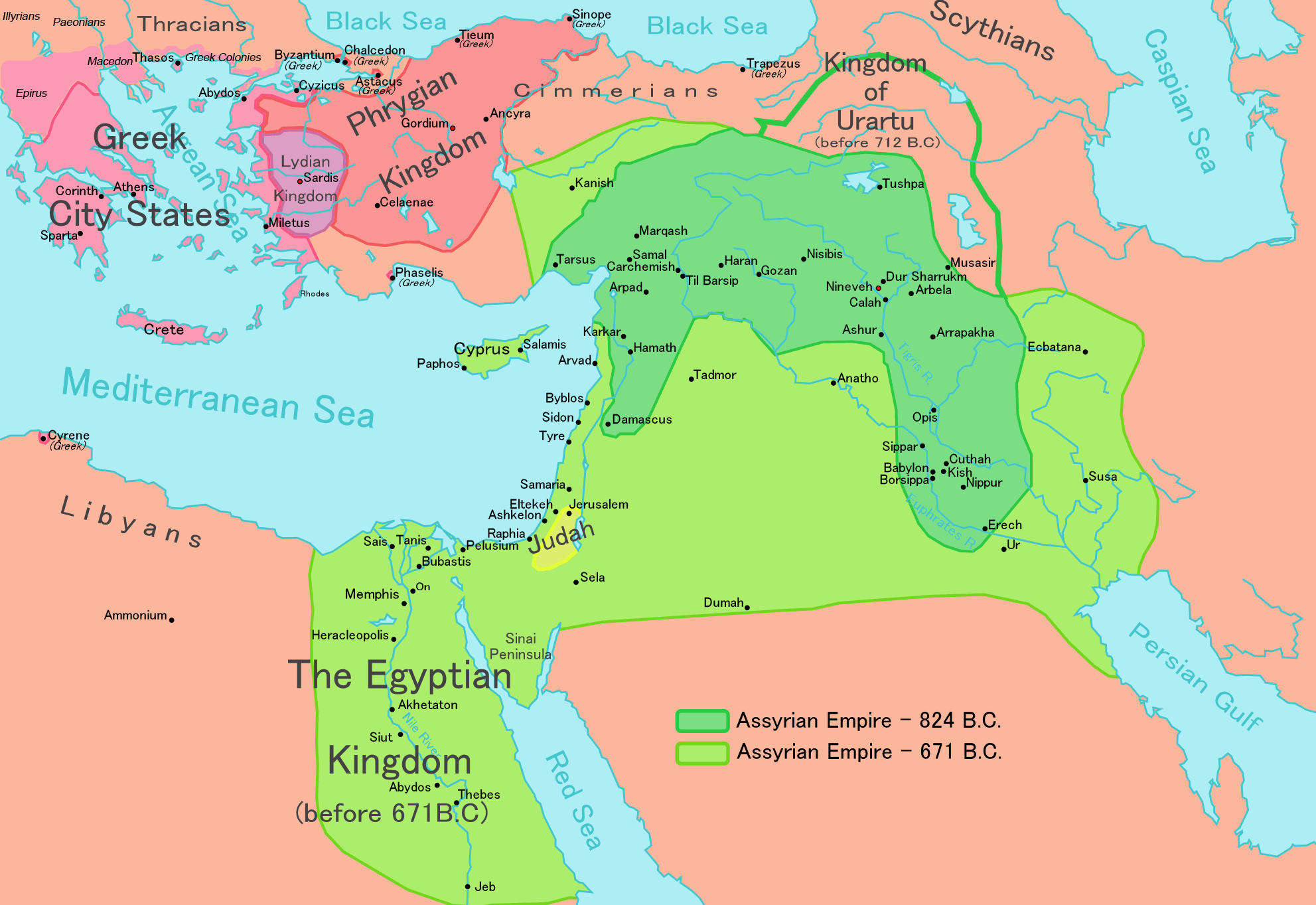
Map of the Neo-Assyrian Empire and its expansions

Bit-Istar was an Assyrian town and a local kingdom (c. 12th century BC - c. 710 BC) at western Zagros that according to inscriptions of Tiglath Pileser III and Sargon II. It was located close to the source of a river to the east of Dyala.

Stronach and Calmeyer proposed Ravansar as a possible candidate for the place of Bit-Istar. Recent surveys by Y. Hassanzadeh led to discovery of new evidence indicating presence of rich 1st-millennium remains close to the spring of Ravansar (34°43′0″N 46°40′0″W).

The ruler of this town during reign of Sargon II was Burburazu who brought his tributes to Sargon during his campaign to the region in 714 BC. A column base at the edge of Ravansar spring could belong to a temple that was built for Ishtar near "Water hole".

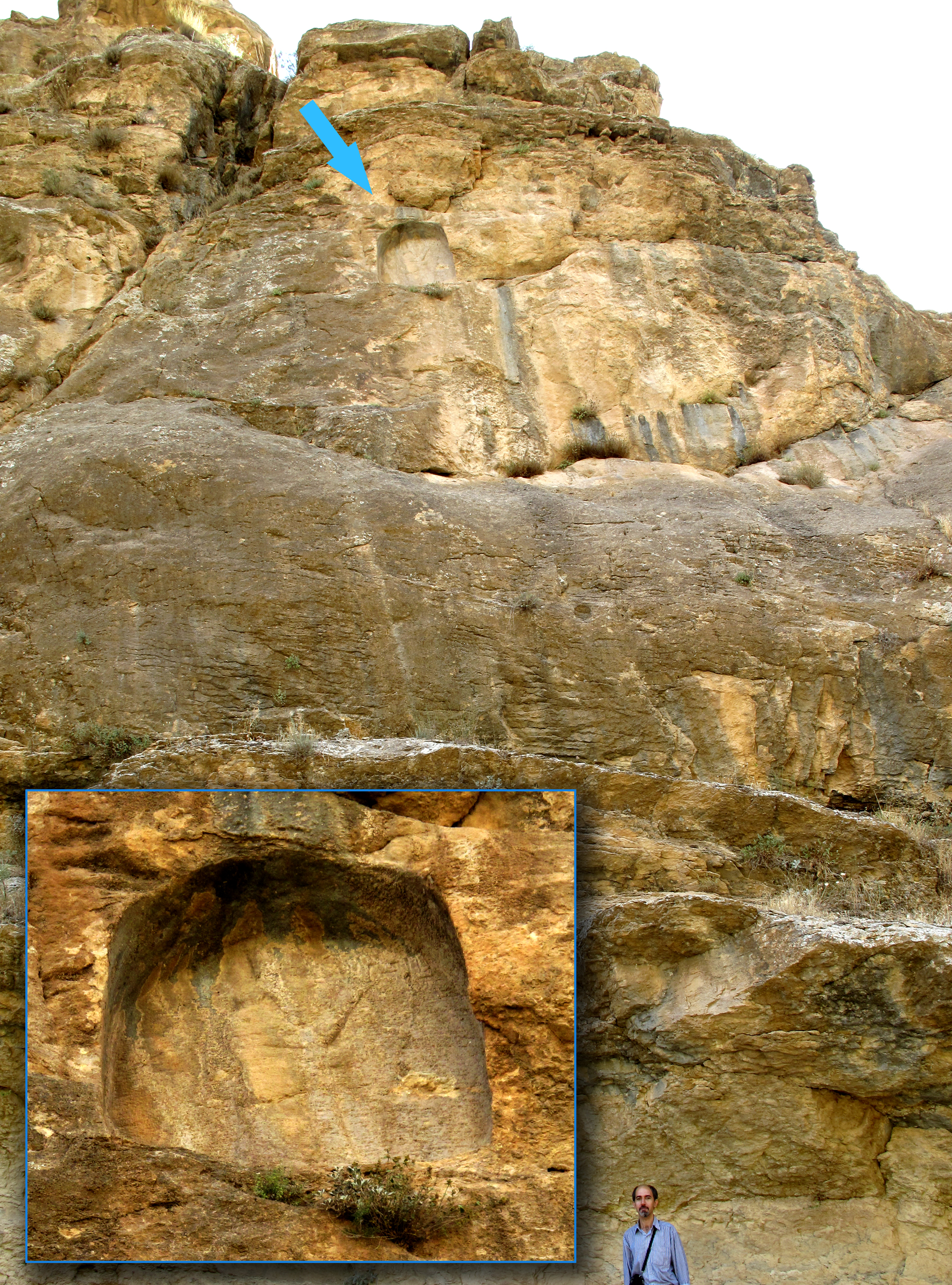
The inscription of Sargon II at Tang-i Var pass near the village of Tang-i Var, Hawraman

Tang-i Var, famous Assyrian inscription from reign of Sargon II is located about 30 km to north of Ravansar.
