= List of political entities in the 7th century BC =

Political entities in the 8th century BC – Political entities in the 6th century BC – Political entities by century

This is a list of states or polities that existed in the 7th century BC.

== Africa ==
State	Existed
Aethiopia	c. 13th – 5th centuries BC
Carthaganian Empire	650–146 BC
Kingdom of Dʿmt	980–400 BC
Cyrenaica	631–525 BC
Garamantian Empire	1000 BC – 700 AD
Kingdom of Kush	1070 BC – 350 AD
Libu	1550–146 BC
Macrobia	c. 8th – 4th centuries BC
Nok	1000 BC – 300 AD

== Americas ==
name	existed
Maya	2000 BC – 900 AD
Olmec	1400–400 BC
Paracas	800–100 BC
Pueblo	12th century BC – 14th century AD
Zapotec	700 BC – 1521 AD

== Europe ==
=== North and West ===
name	existed
Brigantia	700 BC – 1st century AD
Caledonia	650 BC – 1st century AD
Kingdom of Connacht	c. 10th century BC – 1474 AD
Helvetii	650 BC – 68 AD
Silure	650 BC – 78 AD
Suebi	600 BC – 409 AD

=== South and East ===
State	Existed
Arcadia	980–743 BC
Acarnania	7th – 1st century BC
Kingdom of Argolis	1200–337 BC
Republic of Athens	1068–355 BC
Cantabria	650 BC – 1st century AD
Carthaginian Empire	650–146 BC
Celtiberia	650–19 BC
Corinthia	700–338 BC
Dacia	700 BC – 106 AD
Kingdom of Etruria	768–264 BC
Getae	7th century BC – 4th century AD
Iapydes	9th century – 34 BC
Illyria	2000–168 BC
Liburnia	11th century – 34 BC
Locria	1250–386 BC
Lucania	1000–356 BC
Magna Graecia	740–89 BC
Oenotria	1000–325 BC
Padanian Etruria	9th century – 5th century BC
Phocis	690–222 BC
Kingdom of Rome	753–509 BC
Kingdom of Sabinum	c. 760–494 BC
Samnium	c. 600–82 BC
Sicani	c. 13th century – 300 BC
Sicels	c. 11th century – 425 BC
Kingdom of Sparta	950–146 BC
Kingdom of Thessaly	950–344 BC
Tartessos	1000–450 BC
Thrace	1200–450 BC
Umbria	9th century – 3rd century BC

== Eurasian Steppe and Central Asia ==
name	existed
Aria	700 BC – 300 BC
Caspiane	650 BC – 387 AD
Bactria	1140–550 BC
Kingdom of Balhara	12th – 7th centuries BC
Bulgar	7th century BC – 7th century AD
Chorasmia	1290–180 BC
Cimmeria	1300–625 BC
Kingdom of Colchis	1300 BC – 2nd century AD
Dahae	700–530 BC
Huns	600 BC – 370 AD
Issedon	650–58 BC
Magyar	1100 BC – 895 AD
Qiang	2000 BC – 150 BC
Scythia	690 BC – 250 BC
Sogdiana	750–550 BC
Thyssagetae	650 BC – 110 AD
Xianyun	824–209 BC

== East Asia ==
Name	Existed
Ba (state)	13th century – 311 BC
Cai (state)	980–447 BC
Cao (state)	1053–487 BC
Chen (state)	1046–479 BC
Chu (state)	1030–223 BC
Donghu	1400–150 BC
Kingdom of Gojoseon	2333–108 BC
Jin (state)	1042–376 BC
Pi (state)	1046–418 BC
Qiang	2000 BC – 150 BC
Qi (Henan)	1600–445 BC
Qi (state)	1046–221 BC
Qin (state)	858–221 BC
Quanrong	954–301 BC
Sui (state)	771–221 BC
Sumpa	1600 BC – 7th century AD
Shu (state)	1046–316 BC
Teng (state)	1046–414 BC
Kingdom of Van Lang	2879–258 BC
Xu (state)	2000–512 BC
Yan (state)	1046–222 BC
Zhou Kingdom	1046–256 BC
Zou (state)	1012–350 BC

== South Asia ==
Name	Existed
Anarta kingdom	1100–550 BC
Anga kingdom	1380–550 BC
Avanti kingdom	900–322 BC
Danda kingdom	1100–450 BC
Haryanka Kingdom	684–413 BC
Kalinga Kingdom	1376–285 BC
Kamboja kingdom	1450–195 BC
Kasmira kingdom	1250–322 BC
Kimpurusha kingdom	1000–325 BC
Kirata kingdom	1350 – c. 300 BC
Kosala	1000–266 BC
Lanka	1100–543 BC
Magadha kingdom	799–323 BC
Malla republics	c. 7th century BCE – c. 4th century BCE
Matsya kingdom	1180–318 BC
Panchala kingdom	1100–4th century BC
Pandya kingdom	1350–460 BC
Parvata kingdom	c. 9th century – 325 BC
Pundra kingdom	1300 BC – 550 AD
Shakya	800–320 BC
Sinhala kingdom	700–505 BC
Surasena	1000–323 BC
Trigarta kingdom	1150–322 BC
Vanga kingdom	1300 BC – 580 AD
Vatsa	1100–323 BC
Vajjika League	c. 7th century BCE – c. 468 BC
Yaksha kingdom	1200–350 BC

== West Asia ==
name	existed
Aramean Kingdom	2300 – 700 BC
Kingdom of Awsan	7th century BC – 100 AD
Kingdom of Caria	11th – 6th century BC
Chaldean Kingdom	1100–539 BC
Kingdom of Cilicia	795–546 BC
Principality of Corduene	800 BC – 653 AD
Doris	1200–580 BC
Kingdom of Edom	1200–125 BC
Elamite Empire	1210–535 BC
Ellipian Kingdom	850–609 BC
Kingdom of Hadhramaut	700 BC – 320 AD
Kingdom of Judah	930- 586 BC
Kingdom of Lycia	1183–546 BC
Lydian Empire	680–546 BC
Magan	2200–550 BC
Mannaean Kingdom	1110–616 BC
Median Empire	678–549 BC
Kingdom of Mysia	1320–301 BC
Neo-Babylonian Empire	626–539 BC
Paphlagonia	1480–183 BC
Parsua	860–600 BC
Phoenicia	1800–539 BC
Kingdom of Saba	1100–275 BC
Principality of Sam'al	1200–680 BC
Saparda Kingdom	7200–670 BC
Kingdom of Tuwanuwa	1000–700 BC
Kingdom of Urartu	860–590 BC
Principality of Zabdicene	780 BC – 5th century AD
Zikirti Kingdom	750–521 BC

== See also ==
- List of Bronze Age states
- List of Classical Age states
- List of Iron Age states
- List of states during Late Antiquity
