= List of political entities in the 4th century BC =

This is a list of sovereign states or polities that existed in the 4th century BC.

== Sovereign states ==
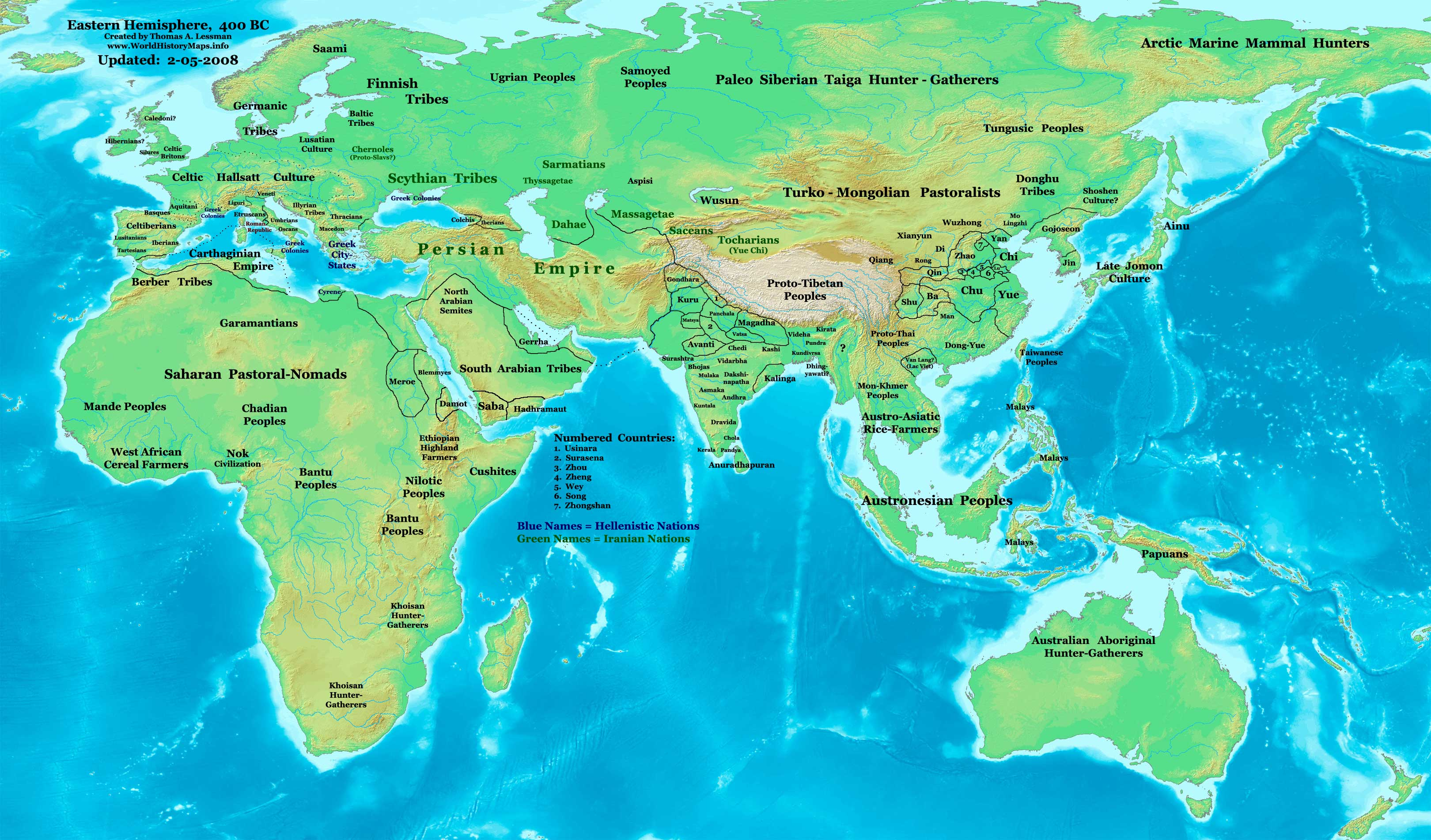
Map of the Eastern Hemisphere in 400 BC

Sovereign state	Years
Achaemenid Empire	550–330 BC
Adena culture	1000–200 BC
Albania	4th century BC – 8th century AD
Ammon	c. 10th century – 332 BC
Athens	510–322 BC
Atropatene	320s BC – 3rd century AD
Bithynia	297–74 BC
Carthaginian Empire	650–146 BC
Chavín culture	900–200 BC
Chera Kingdom	5th century BC – AD 1102
Chola	3rd century BC -AD 13th century
Chorrera	1800–300 BC
Chu	1030–223 BC
Corinth	700–338 BC
Cyrene	631–525 BC
Dʿmt	c. 980–400 BC
Dardanian Kingdom	c.448 BC – 28 BC
Gojoseon	2333–108 BC
Han	403–230 BC
Iberia	302 BC – 580 AD
Kalinga	1376–285 BC
Kush	1070 BC – 350 AD
Lu	856–256 BC
Lycaonia	8th century – 200 BC
Macedonia	8th century – 146 BC
Maya civilization	2000 BC- 900 AD
Meroë	542 BC – 4th century AD
Nanda Empire	424–321 BC
Olmec	1400–400 BC
Pandya	4th century BC-1650 AD
Paracas culture	600–175 BC
Ptolemaic Kingdom	305–30 BC
Qi	1046–241 BC
Qin	845–221 BC
Roman Republic	509–27 BC
Saba	12th/8th century BC – 275 AD
Scythia	8th century BC – 2nd century AD
Seleucid Empire	312–63 BC
Sparta	11th century – 195 BC
Taranto	706 BC – 1465 AD
Thebes	14th century BC – 1458 AD
Văn Lang	2879–258 BC
Wei	403–225 BC
Yan	865–222 BC
Yue	334–334 BC
Zheng	806–375 BC
Zhoa	403–222 BC
Zhou	1045–256 BC

== See also ==
- List of Bronze Age states
- List of Iron Age states
- List of Classical Age states
- List of states during Late Antiquity
- List of states during the Middle Ages

List of political entities in the 4th century BC
Preceded by 5th century BC	Sovereign states of the 4th century BC	Succeeded by 3rd century BC
