= List of political entities in the 2nd century BC =

This is a list of sovereign states or polities that existed in the 2nd century BC.

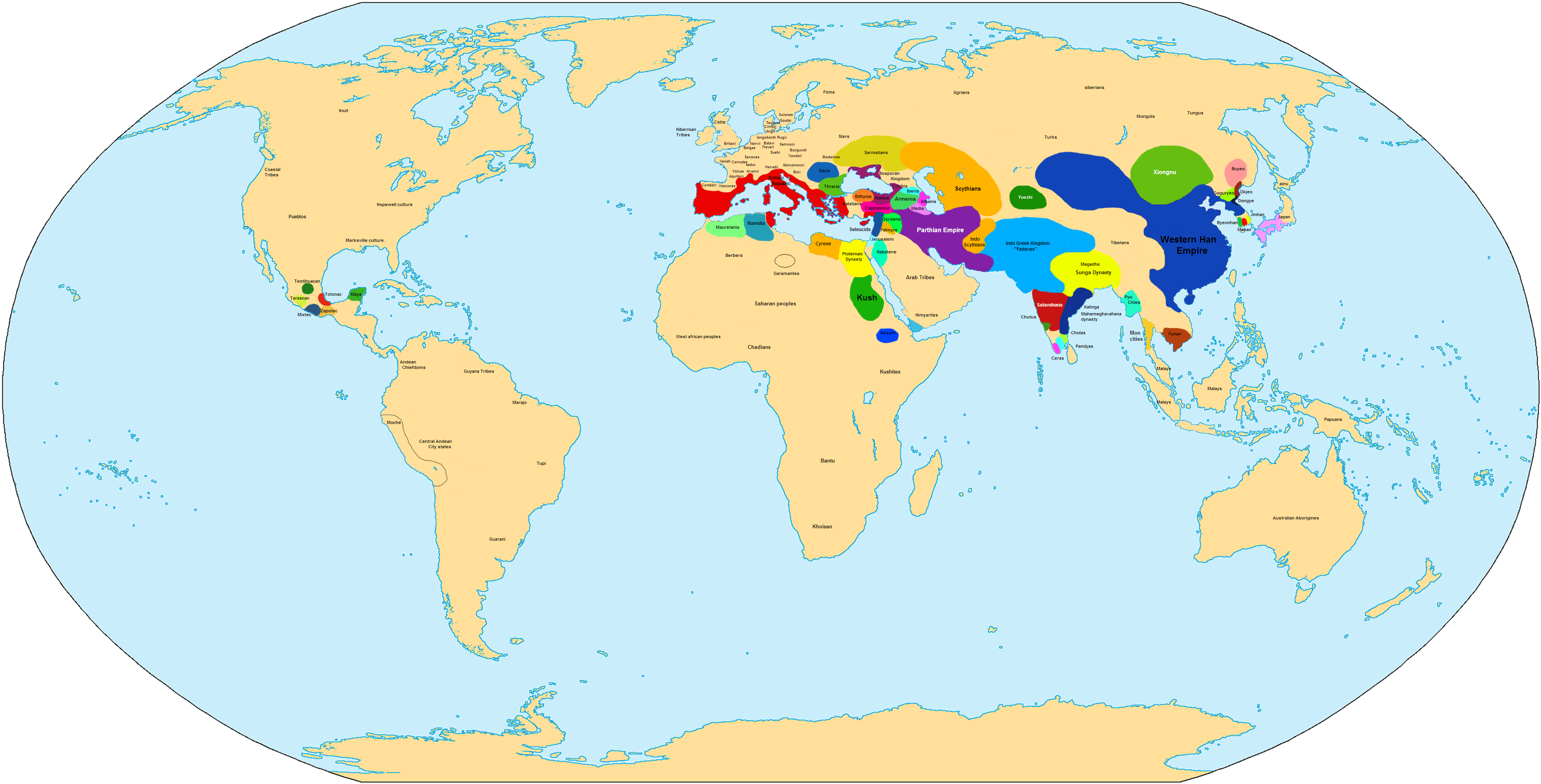
Map of the world in 100 BC

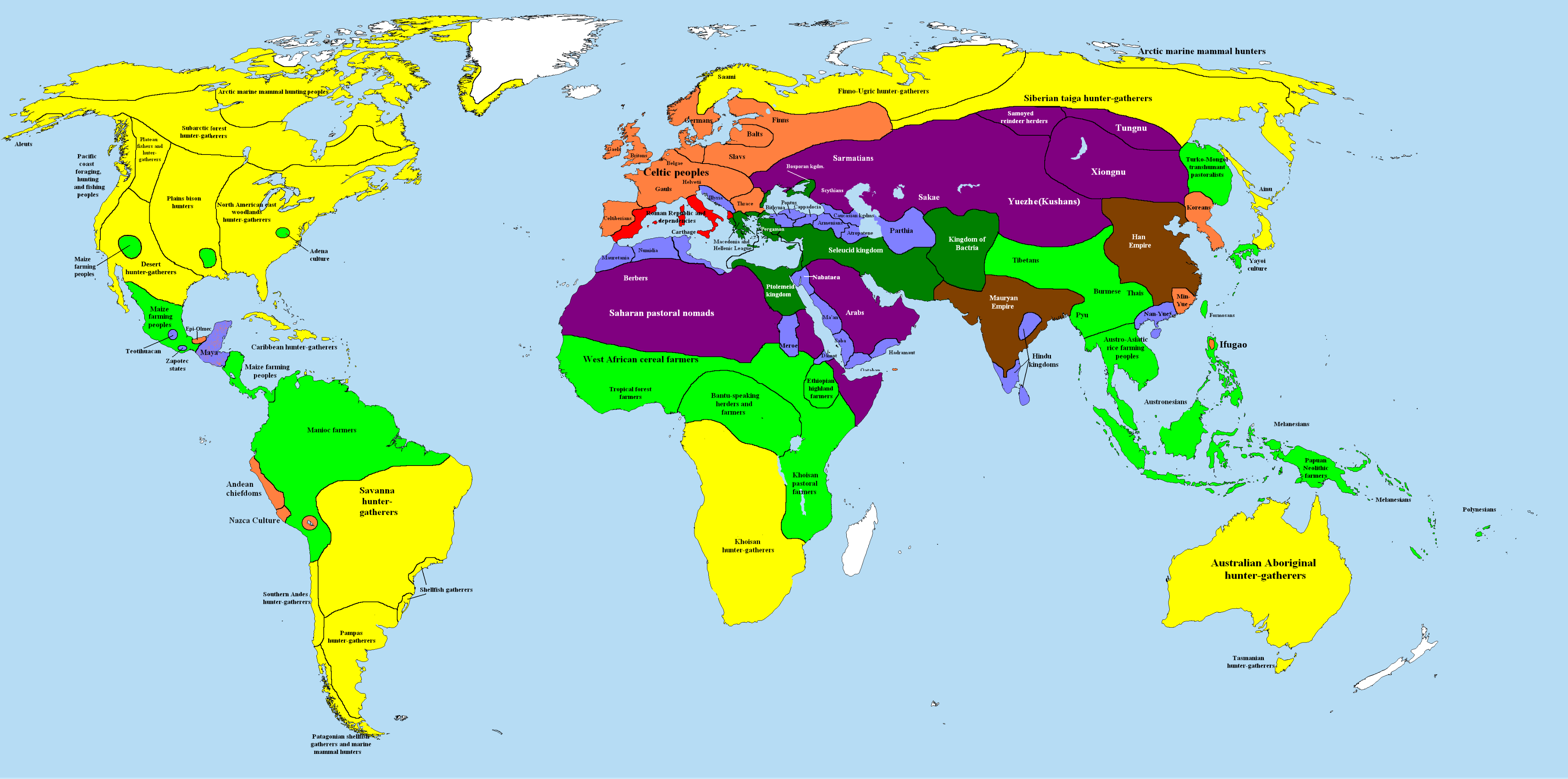
Map of the world in 200 BC

== Political entities ==
Sovereign state	Years
Adena culture	1000–200 BC
Albania	4th century BC – 8th century AD
Ardiaean Kingdom	c.260–168 BC
Armenia	190 BC–428 AD
Atropatene	320s BC – 3rd century AD
Bithynia	297–74 BC
Buyeo	2nd century BC – 494 AD
Carthaginian Empire	650–146 BC
Chavín culture	900–200 BC
Chera Kingdom	5th century BC – 1102 AD
Commagene	163 BC–72 AD
Dardanian Kingdom	c.448–28 BC
Dongye	3rd century BC – 5th century AD
Gojoseon	2333–108 BC
Greco-Bactrian Kingdom	256–125 BC
Han Empire	206 BC–220 AD
Himyarite Kingdom	110 BC–520 AD
Iberia	302 BC–580 AD
Indo–Greek Kingdom	180 BC–10 AD
Indo–Scythian Kingdom	200 BC–400 AD
Jin	3rd century – 2nd century BC
Judea	137–37 BC
Kush	1070 BC–350 AD
Lycaonia	8th century – 200 BC
Macedonia	8th century – 146 BC
Mauretania	110 BC–40 AD
Maurya Empire	321–185 BC
Maya civilization	c.2000 BC–1697 AD
Minyue	224–110 BC
Nanyue	204–111 BC
Nabataean kingdom	168 BC–106 AD
Numidia	202–46 BC
Okjeo	2nd century BC – 5th century AD
Osroene	132 BC–244 AD
Paracas culture	600–175 BC
Parthian Empire	247 BC–224 AD
Pontus	291 BC–62 AD
Ptolemaic Kingdom	305–30 BC
Roman Republic	509–27 BC
Sātavāhana Empire	230 BC–220 AD
Scythia	8th century BC – 2nd century AD
Seleucid Empire	312–63 BC
Shunga Empire	185 BC - 73 BC
Sparta	11th century – 195 BC
Scordisci	c.278–50 BC

== See also ==
- List of Bronze Age states
- List of Iron Age states
- List of Classical Age states
- List of states during Late Antiquity
- List of states during the Middle Ages

List of political entities in the 2nd century BC
Preceded by 3rd century BC	Political entities of the 2nd century BC	Succeeded by 1st century BC
