= List of political entities in the 1st century BC =

Political entities in the 2nd century BC – Political entities in the 1st century – Political entities by year

This is a list of political entities that existed between 100 BC and 1 BC.

== Political entities ==
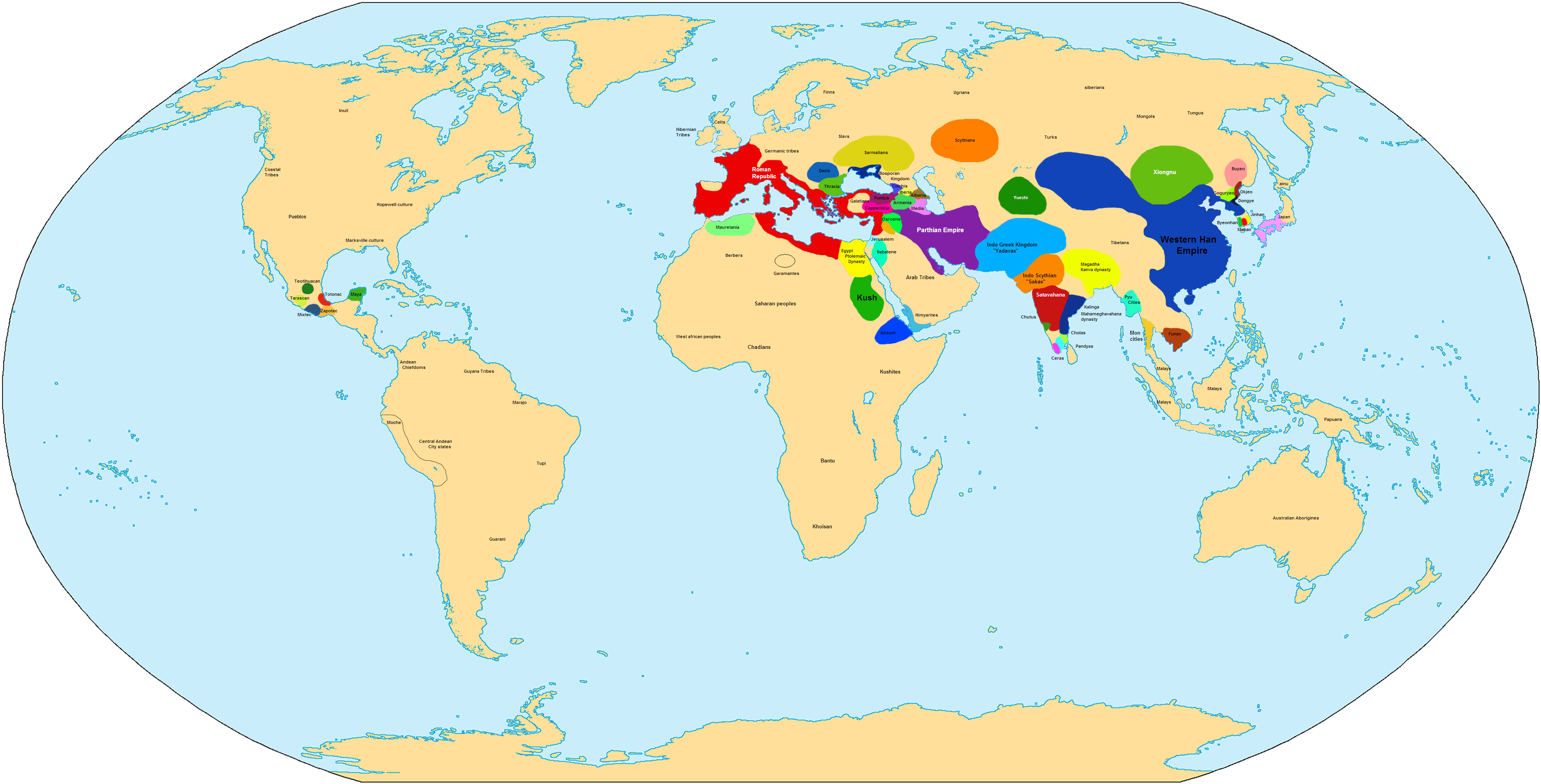
Map of the world in 50 BC

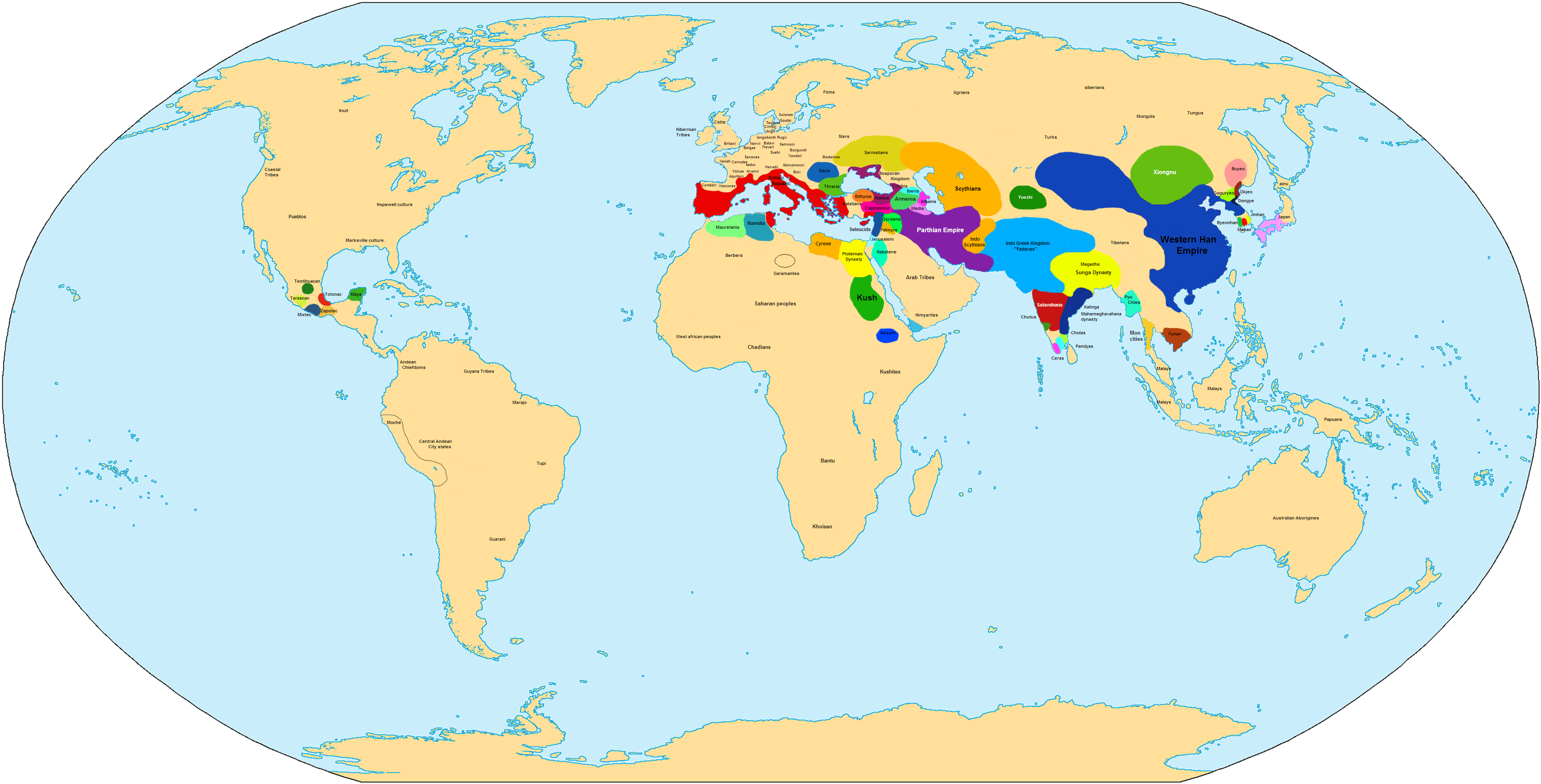
Map of the world in 100 BC

Name	Capital(s)	State type	Existed	Location
Sao civilisation	Various	Tribal city states	6th century BC – 16th century AD	Africa: Central
Cyrene	Cyrene	Kingdom, republic, kingdom, republic, kingdom	632–30 BC	Africa: North
Garamantes	Garama	Tribal confederation/empire	500 BC – 700 AD	Africa: North
Numidia	Cirta	Kingdom	202 – 46 BC	Africa: North
Blemmyes		Tribal Kingdom	600 BC – 8th century AD	Africa: Northeast
Kush	Kerma; Napata; Meroe	Kingdom	1070 BC – 350 AD	Africa: Northeast
Ptolemaic Kingdom	Alexandria	Kingdom/empire	305 – 30 BC	Africa: Northeast; Asia: West
Gaetulia		Tribal confederation	c. 350 BC – 550 AD	Africa: Northwest
Mauretania	Julia Caesara	Kingdom/client kingdom	285 BC – 431 AD	Africa: Northwest
Nok culture	Various	Tribal chiefdoms/kingdom	1000 BC – 300 AD	Africa: West
Maya	Various	Kingdom city states	2000 BC – 900AD	Americas: Central
Zapotec	Various	Kingdom city states	700 BC – 1521 AD	Americas: Central
Pueblo	Various	Tribal chiefdoms	12th century BC – 14th century AD	Americas: North
Teotihuacan Empire	Teotihuacan	Empire	100 BC – 8th century AD	Americas: North
Nazca	Various	Tribal chiefdoms	100 BC – 800 AD	Americas: South
Acarnania		Kingdom	7th – 1st century BC	Europe: Balkans
Basternae	Various	Tribal confederation	200 BC – 300AD	Europe: Balkans
Dacia	Sarmizegetusa, Regia	Kingdom/empire	700 BC – 106 AD	Europe: Balkans
Getae		Tribal Kingdom	7th century BC – 4th century AD	Europe: Balkans
Iapydes	Various	Tribal confederation	9th century – 34 BC	Europe: Balkans
Liburnia		Tribal thalassocracy	11th century – 34 BC	Europe: Balkans
Maedi	Iamphorynna	Tribal kingdom	5th century – 86 BC	Europe: Balkans
Odrysia	Seuthopolis	Kingdom	460 BC – 46 AD	Europe: Balkans
Paeonia		Principality/kingdom/client	535 BC – 681 AD	Europe: Balkans
Scordisci	Singidunum	Independent tribal state	3rd century BC – 1st century AD	Europe: Balkans
Brigantia		Tribal kingdom	700 BC – c. 2nd AD	Europe: British Isles
Catuvellauni	Verulamium	Tribal kingdom/client	550 BC – 51 AD	Europe: British Isles
Caledonia		Tribal confederacy	650 BC – 1st century AD	Europe: British Isles
Connacht		Tribal chiefdom/kingdom	c. 10th century BC – 1474 AD	Europe: British Isles
Deceangli		Tribal kingdom	500 BC – 76 AD	Europe: British Isles
Cornovii		Tribal kingdom	4th century BC – 343 AD	Europe: British Isles
Iceni	Venta Icenorum	Tribal kingdom/client kingdom	500 BC – 64 AD	Europe: British Isles
Iverni	Ivernis	Tribal federated chiefdoms	500 BC – 400 AD	Europe: British Isles
Ordovices		Tribal kingdom	500 BC – c. 1st AD	Europe: British Isles
Silures		Tribal kingdom	650 BC – c. 1st AD	Europe: British Isles
Pictland		Kingdom	250 BC – 850 AD [3]	Europe: British Isles
Cimmerian Bosporus	Panticapaeum	Kingdom/client	480 BC – 370 AD	Europe: East
Gelonia	Gelonos	Tribal kingdom	5th century BC – 5th century AD	Europe: East
Daunia	Daunia	Tribal kingdom	7th century – 89 BC	Europe: South
Iapyges	Gnapia	Tribal kingdom	11th century – 89 BC	Europe: South
Magna Graecia	Various	Kingdom city states	740 – 89 BC	Europe: South
Messapii	Hyria	Tribal kingdom	8th century – 89 BC	Europe: South
Noricum	Magdalensberg	Tribal kingdom/federation	400 – 16 BC	Europe: South
Samnites	Bovianum	Tribal confederation	c. 600 – 82 BC	Europe: South
Magyar		Tribal confederation/principality	1100 BC – 895 AD	Europe: East
Sarmatians	Tarki (Makhachkala)	Tribal confederation	450BC – 400 AD	Europe: East
Venedae		Tribal confederation	400 BC – 7th century AD	Europe: East
Roman Republic	Rome	Republic	509 – 27 BC	Europe: South, West, Balkans; Africa: North; Asia: West
Roman Empire	Rome, Constantinople	Empire	27 BC – 1453 AD	Europe: South, West, Balkans; Africa: North; Asia: West
Alemanni		Tribal confederation	85 BC – 213 AD	Europe: West
Aquitani	Various	Tribal confederation/client	550 – 27 BC	Europe: West
Astures	Asturica	Tribal federation	550 BC – 68 AD	Europe: West
Belgae	Various	Tribal confederation	600 BC – c. 1st AD	Europe: West
Boii	Felsina	Tribal kingdom	390 BC – 8 AD	Europe: West
Cantabri		Tribal confederation	650 BC – 1st century AD	Europe: West
Celtici		Tribal confederation	600 – 19 BC	Europe: West
Helvetii		Tribal confederacy	650 BC – 68 AD	Europe: West
Lusitanians		Tribal confederation	c. 450 – 27 BC	Europe: West
Raeti		Tribal confederation	500 – 15 BC	Europe: West
Saxons (Continental)		Tribal confederation	5th century BC – 754 AD	Europe: West
Suebi		Tribal Confederation	60 BC – 409AD	Europe: West
Vandals		Tribal chiefdoms	2nd century BC – 409 AD	Europe: West
Vettones		Tribal confederation	300 – 14 BC	Europe: West
Vindelicia		Tribal kingdom	5th century BC – 1st century AD	Europe: West
Caucasian Albania	Kabalak, Partav	Kingdom/client	65 BC – 628 AD	Eurasian: Caucasus
Commagene	Samosata	Kingdom/client	163 BC – 72 AD	Eurasian: Caucasus
Colchis	Phasis	Kingdom	1300 BC – 2nd century AD	Eurasian: Caucasus
Caspiane		Tribal Kingdom/Client	650 BC – 387 AD	Eurasian: Caucasus
Iberia	Various	Kingdom	302 BC – 580 AD	Eurasian: Caucasus
Lazica	Phasis	Kingdom/client	1st century BC – 7th century AD	Eurasian: Caucasus
Araba	Hatra	Kingdom	3rd century BC – 300AD	Asia: West
Armenia	Van	Kingdom	553 BC – 428AD	Asia: West
Lesser Armenia		Principality	331 – 72 BC	Asia: West
Ma'in	?/ Yathill	Kingdom	580 – 85 BC	Asia: West
Awsan	Ḥajar Yaḥirr	Kingdom	7th century BC – 100 AD	Asia: West
Bithynia	Nicomedia, Nicaea	Kingdom/client	297 – 74 BC	Asia: West
Atropatene	Ganzak	Kingdom/client	320 BC – 226AD	Asia: West
Cappadocia, Ariarathid	Mazaka	Kingdom	331 BC–17 AD	Asia: West
Carmania		Kingdom/client	600 BC – 651 AD	Asia: West
Characene	Charax Spasinou	Kingdom	127 BC – 222 AD	Asia: West
Commagene	Samosata	Kingdom	163 BC–72 AD	Asia: West
Corduene		Principality/kingdom/client	800 BC – 653 AD	Asia: West
Elymais	Susa	Kingdom/client	147 BC – 224 AD	Asia: West
Galatia	Ancyra	Empire	280 – 64 BC	Asia: West
Khwarezm	Kath, Gurganj	Kingdom	180 BC – 98 AD	Asia: West
Hadhramaut		Kingdom	700 BC – 320 AD	Asia: West
Hasmonean Kingdom	Jerusalem	Kingdom	140 – 37 BC	Asia: West
Herodian Judea	Jerusalem	Kingdom/client	37 – 4 BC	Asia: West
Himyarite Kingdom	Zafar	Kingdom	110 BC–570 AD	Asia: West
Kindah	Qaryat Dhāt Kāhil	Tribal kingdom	2nd century BC – 525 AD	Asia: West
Nabataean Kingdom	Petra	Kingdom	168 BC – 106 AD	Asia: West
Osroene	Edessa	Kingdom/client	134 BC – 244 AD	Asia: West
Parthian Empire	Ctesiphon	Empire	247 BC – 224 AD	Asia: West
Qataban	Timna	Kingdom	6th century BC – 2nd century AD	Asia: West
Qedarite	Adumattu	Tribal confederation/client	870 BC – 250 AD	Asia: West
Seleucid Empire	Seleucia, Antioch	Empire	312 – 63 BC	Asia: West
Sophene	Karkathiokerta	Kingdom	298 – 94 BC	Asia: West
Pontic Empire	Amaseia, Sinope	Empire	250 BC – 68 AD	Asia: West
Zabdicene		Principality/client	780 BC – 5th century AD	Asia: West
Dayuan		Kingdom/client	329 BC – 280 AD	Asia: Central
Fergana	Khokand	Kingdom	220 BC – 590 AD	Asia: Central
Issedones	Issedon	Tribal chiefdom	650 – 58 BC	Asia: Central
Kangju		Tribal Federation	280 BC – 585 AD	Asia: Central
Massagatae		Tribal confederation	600 – 46 BC	Asia: Central
Saka		Tribal confederation	500 BC – 50 BC	Asia: Central
Sumpa		Tribal chiefdom/client	1600 BC – 7th century AD	Asia: Central
Yuezhi		Nomadic tribal confederation	650 – 20 BC	Asia: Central
Anuradhapura	Anuradhapura	Kingdom	377 BC – 1017 AD	Asia: South
Ay	Aykudi	Kingdom	4th century BC – 12th century AD	Asia: South
Chera dynasty		Kingdom	5th century BC – 1102 AD	Asia: South
Chola dynasty	Various	Kingdom	300s BC–1279 AD	Asia: South
Indo-Greek Kingdom	Alexandria in the Caucasus, Taxila, Sagala	Kingdom	180 BC – 10 AD	Asia: South
Indo-Parthian Kingdom	Taxila	Kingdom	12 BC – 98 AD	Asia: South
Indo–Scythian Kingdom	Various	Kingdom	200 BC–400 AD	Asia: South
Kuninda Kingdom	Shravasti	Kingdom	500 BC – 300 AD	Asia: South
Mushika	Ezhimalai	Kingdom	3rd century BC – 4th century AD	Asia: South
Pandyan dynasty	Kanchi	Empire	250 BC – 800 AD	Asia: South
Pundra	Pundravardhana	Kingdom	1300 BC – 550 AD	Asia: South
Rajarata	Various	Kingdom	377 BC – 1310 AD	Asia: South
Ruhuna	Magama	Principality	200 BC – 450 AD	Asia: South
Satavahana dynasty		Monarchy	1st century BC–2nd century AD	Asia: South
Vakataka Empire	Amaravati	Empire	230 BC – 230 AD	Asia: South
Vanga	Gange	Kingdom	1300 BC – 580 AD	Asia: South
Chi Tu		Kingdom	100 BC – 7th century AD	Asia: Southeast
Pyu city-states	Sri Ksetra	Federated city states	250 BC – 1085 AD	Asia: Southeast
Thaton Kingdom	Thaton	Kingdom	300 BC – 1085 AD	Asia: Southeast
Western Han dynasty	Various	Empire	206 BC – 220 AD	Asia: East, China
Baekje	Various	Kingdom	18 BC – 660 AD	Asia: East, Korean Peninsula
Buyeo	Buyeoseong	Kingdom	189 BC – 494 AD	Asia: East, Korean Peninsula
Dongye		Chiefdom	3rd century BC – 5th century AD	Asia: East, Korean Peninsula
Goguryeo	Various	Kingdom	37 BC – 668 AD	Asia: East, Korean Peninsula
Jolbon		Tribal kingdom	1st century – 37 BC	Asia: East, Korean Peninsula
Mahan confederacy	Cheonan	Confederacy	98 BC – 250 AD	Asia: East, Korean Peninsula
Okjeo		Tribal state	2nd century BC – 5th century AD	Asia: East, Korean Peninsula
Samhan		Confederacy	1st century BC – 4th century AD	Asia: East, Korean Peninsula
Silla	Gyeongju	Kingdom	55 BC – 935 AD	Asia: East, Korean Peninsula

== See also ==
- List of Bronze Age states
- List of Iron Age states
- List of Classical Age states
- List of states during Late Antiquity
- List of states during the Middle Ages

List of political entities in the 1st century BC
Preceded by 2nd century BC	Political entities of the 1st century BC	Succeeded by 1st century AD
