= List of political entities in the 3rd century BC =

This is a list of sovereign states or polities that existed in the 3rd century BC.

== Political entities ==
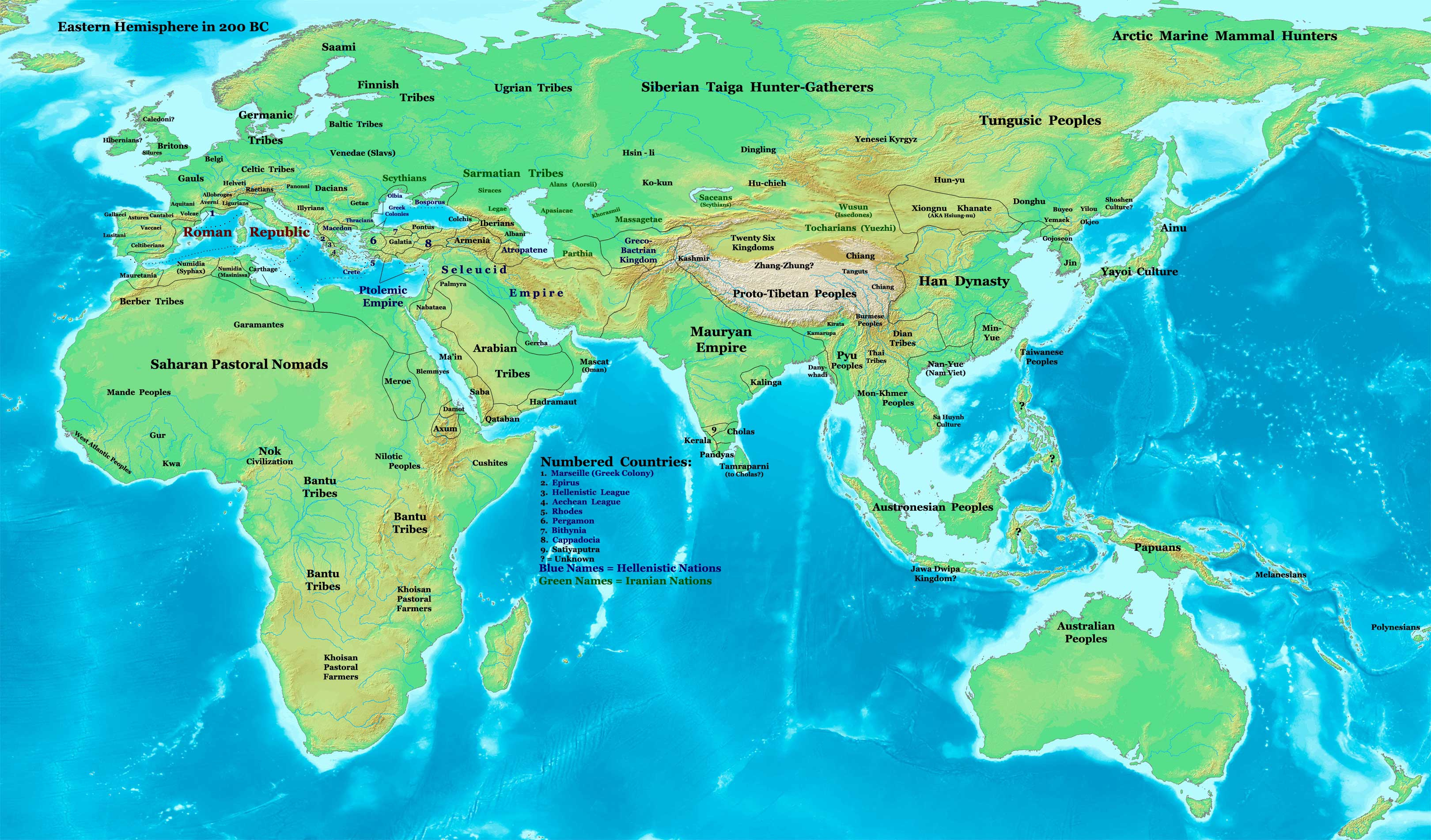
Map of the world in 200 BC

Sovereign state
Achaea – Achaean League (from 280 BC)
Adena
Aetolia – Aetolian League
Albania – Kingdom of Albania
Ardiaean Kingdom – Ardiaean Illyric Kingdom (from 260 BC)
Atropatene – Kingdom of Atropatene
Bithynia (from 297 BC)
Bosporus – Bosporan Kingdom
Carthage
Chavín – Chavín Culture (to 250 BC)
Chera Kingdom
Chola – Chola Empire
Chorrera (to 300 BC)
Chu – State of Chu (to 223 BC)
Dardanian Kingdom – Dardanian Illyric Kingdom
Dongye – Korean chiefdom
Eastern Zhou – Kingdom of Eastern Zhou (from 256 BC – 249 BC)
Ethiopia – Ethiopian Empire
Gojoseon – Ancient Korean Kingdom
Greco-Bactrian Kingdom (from 256 BC)
Han – Han dynasty (from 206 BC)
Han – State of Han (to 230 BC)
Iberia
Kush – Kingdom of Kush
Jin State – Jin state
Lu – State of Lu (to 256 BC)
Lycaonia
Macedonia
Maurya Empire
Maya
Minyue (from 224 BC)
Numidia – Kingdom of Numidia (from 202 BC)
Paracas
Parthian Empire (from 247 BC)
Pontus –- Kingdom of Pontus (from 291 BC)
Ptolemaic Empire
Qi – State of Qi (to 241 BC)
Qin – State of Qin
Qin – Qin dynasty (from 221 BC – 206 BC)
Roman Republic
Sātavāhana Empire (from 230 BC)
Scythia
Seleucid Empire
Sparta
State of the Scordisci (from c. 278 BC)
Upper Egypt (from 206 BC to 186 BC)
Văn Lang (to 258 BC)
Wei – State of Wei (to 225 BC)
Yan – State of Yan (to 222 BC)
Zhoa – State of Zhoa (to 222 BC)
Zhou – Zhou dynasty (to 256 BC)

== See also ==
- List of Bronze Age states
- List of Iron Age states
- List of Classical Age states
- List of states during Late Antiquity
- List of states during the Middle Ages

List of political entities in the 3rd century BC
| Preceded by 4th century BC | Political entities of the 3rd century BC | Succeeded by 2nd century BC |
