= List of Classical Age states =

Classical Antiquity is a period in the history of the Near East and Mediterranean, extending roughly from the 8th century BC to the 6th century AD. It is conventionally taken to begin with the earliest-recorded Greek poetry of Homer (8th–7th century BC), and continues through the emergence of Christianity and the decline of the Roman Empire in the 5th to 6th centuries, the period during which Late Antiquity blends into the "Dark Ages" or Early Middle Ages.

The geographic scope of Classical Antiquity may be taken to extend to Central Asia and North India due to the far-reaching influence of Greek culture during the Hellenistic period (late 4th to 2nd centuries BC), but the historiographies of other world regions have their own notion of "classicity" which do not fall within the scope of this list.

== Africa ==
State	Capital	State type	Existed
Aksumite empire	Aksum	Empire	100–940
Blemmyes		Tribal kingdom	600 BC – 8th century AD
Carthaginian Empire	Carthage	Empire	814–146 BC
D'mt	Yeha	Kingdom	980–400 BC
Cyrenaica	Cyrene	Kingdom	631–525 BC
Egypt	Sais, Mendes, Sebennytos	Kingdom	c. 664 BC – c. 332 BC
Garamantian	Garama	Tribal confederation/empire	1000 BC – 700 AD
Kush	Kerma; Napata; Meroe	Kingdom	1070 BC – 350 AD
Macedonian Empire	Pella	Empire	808 BC – 168 BC
Mauretania	Julia Caesara	Kingdom/client kingdom	285 BC – 698 AD
Numidia	Cirta	Kingdom	202–46 BC
Persian Empire	Ecbatana, Pasargadae, Persepolis, Susa	Empire	550–330 BC
Ptolemaic	Alexandria	Kingdom/empire	305–30 BC
Roman Empire	Rome, Constantinople	Empire	27 BC-476
Roman Republic	Rome	Republic	509–27 BC
Somali City-States	Various	City-states	Various
Tichitt		Kingdom	1400–200 BC

== Europe ==
State	Capital	Type	Existed
Achaean League	Various	Confederation of city states	280–140 BC
Acarnanian League	Various	Confederation of city states	5th century–31 BC
Aeolis	Various	City states	8th–6th century BC
Aetolian League	Various	Confederation of city states	290–189 BC
Amphictyonic league	Various	Confederation of Tribes	
Antigonid Empire		Empire	306–168 BC
Arcadia		Kingdom	980–743 BC
Arcadian League	Various	Confederation of city states	370 BC
Argolis	Argos	Kingdom/republic	1200–226 BC
Athens		Republican city state/client	1068–146 BC
Boeotian League	Various	Confederation of city states	395–171 BC
Carthaginian Empire	Carthage	Empire	650–146 BC
Chalcidian League	Various	Confederation of city states	430–348 BC
Corinthia	Corinth	City state	700–338 BC
Cyprus city-states	Various	City states	800–400 BC
Dacia	Sarmizegetusa, Regia	Kingdom	168 BC – 106 AD
Dardania	Ulpiana?	Tribal kingdom	4th century – 168 BC
Delian League	Various	League of city states	478–404 BC
Elis	Various	City states	1200–188 BC
Etruria	Veii	Kingdom	900–264 BC
Euboean League	Various	Confederation of city states	294 BC – 300 AD
Hellenic League	Various	Federated states	338–322 BC
Illyria			400–158 BC
Ionian League	Various	League of city states	7th century–505 BC
Latin League	Various	Tribal confederation	793–338 BC
Locria	Amphissa, Naupactus	Kingdom	1250–386 BC
Macedonia (ancient kingdom)/Macedonian empire	Pella	Kingdom/empire	808–168 BC/334–323 BC
Magna Graecia	Various	Kingdom city states	740–89 BC
Odrysian kingdom	Seuthopolis	Kingdom	460 BC- 46 AD
Paeonia		Principality/kingdom/client	535 BC – 681 AD
Peloponnesian League	Athens	Confederation of city states	550–366 BC
Persian Empire	Ecbatana, Pasargadae, Persepolis, Susa	Empire	549–330 BC
Phocis	Delphi	Amphictyony	690–222 BC
Rhodes	Rhodes	City-state	408–226 BC
Kingdom of Rome	Rome	Kingdom	753–509 BC
Roman Empire	Rome, Milan, Ravenna, Constantinople	Empire	27 BC-1453 AD
Roman Republic	Rome	Republic	509–27 BC
Sabinum	Bovianum	Tribal kingdom	760 – 494 BC
Samnium		Tribal confederation	600 – 82 BC
Second Athenian League	Athens	Confederation of city states	377–385 BC
Sparta	Sparta	Kingdom	950–146 BC
Tartessos	Tartessus	Tribal kingdom	1000–450 BC
Thebes	Thebes	City-state	7th century–335 BC
Tylis	Tylis	Kingdom	278–212 BC
Umbria		Tribal kingdom	9th century – 3rd century BC

== Eurasian Steppe and Central Asia ==
name	capital	state type	existed
Albania	Kabalak, Partav	Kingdom/client	65 BC – 628 AD
Bactria	Bactra	Tribal kingdom/client	2140–550 BC
Balhara	Balkh	Tribal kingdom	12th–7th centuries BC
Cimmerian Bosporus	Panticapaeum	Kingdom/client	480 BC – 370 AD
Cimmeria	Not specified	Tribal confederation	1300–626 BC
Colchis	Phasis	Kingdom	1300 BC – 2nd century AD
Dayuan		Kingdom/client	329 BC – 280 AD
Fergana	Khokand	Tribal confederation/kingdom	500 BC – 590 AD
Greco-Bactria	Bactra, Alexandria on the Oxus	Kingdom	256–125 BC
Iberia	Armazi, Mtskheta, Tbilisi	Kingdom	302 BC – 508 AD
Indo-Greek	Alexandria(Caucasus), Taxila, Sagala	Kingdom	180 BC – 10 AD
Indo-Parthia	Taxila	Kingdom	12 BC – 98 AD
Indo-Scythia	Sigal, Taxila, Mathura	Kingdom	200 BC – 400 AD
Kangju		Tribal federation	280 BC – 585 AD
Kashgar	Kashgar	Kingdom/client	80–850 AD
Kucha	Kucha	Buddhist kingdom	46–658 AD
Kushan Empire	Bagram, Peshawar, Taxila, Mathura	Empire	30–375 AD
Khwarezm	Kath, Gurganj	Kingdom	180 BC – 98 AD
Lazica	Phasis	Kingdom/client	1st century BC – 7th century AD
Macedonian Empire	Pella	Empire	334–323 BC
Massagetae		Tribal kingdom	c. 8th century BCE–c. 3rd century BCE
Maurya Empire	Pataliputra	Empire	322–185 BC
Parthian Empire	Ctesiphon	Empire	247 BC – 224 AD
Persian Empire	Ecbatana, Pasargadae, Persepolis, Susa	Empire	549–330 BC
Scythia	Neopolis	Tribal kingdom	690BC-250 BC
Seleucid Empire	Seleucia, Antioch	Empire	312–63 BC
Sogdiana	Samarkand, Bukhara, Khujand, Kesh	Kingdom/client	750–550 BC

== East Asia/Southeast Asia ==
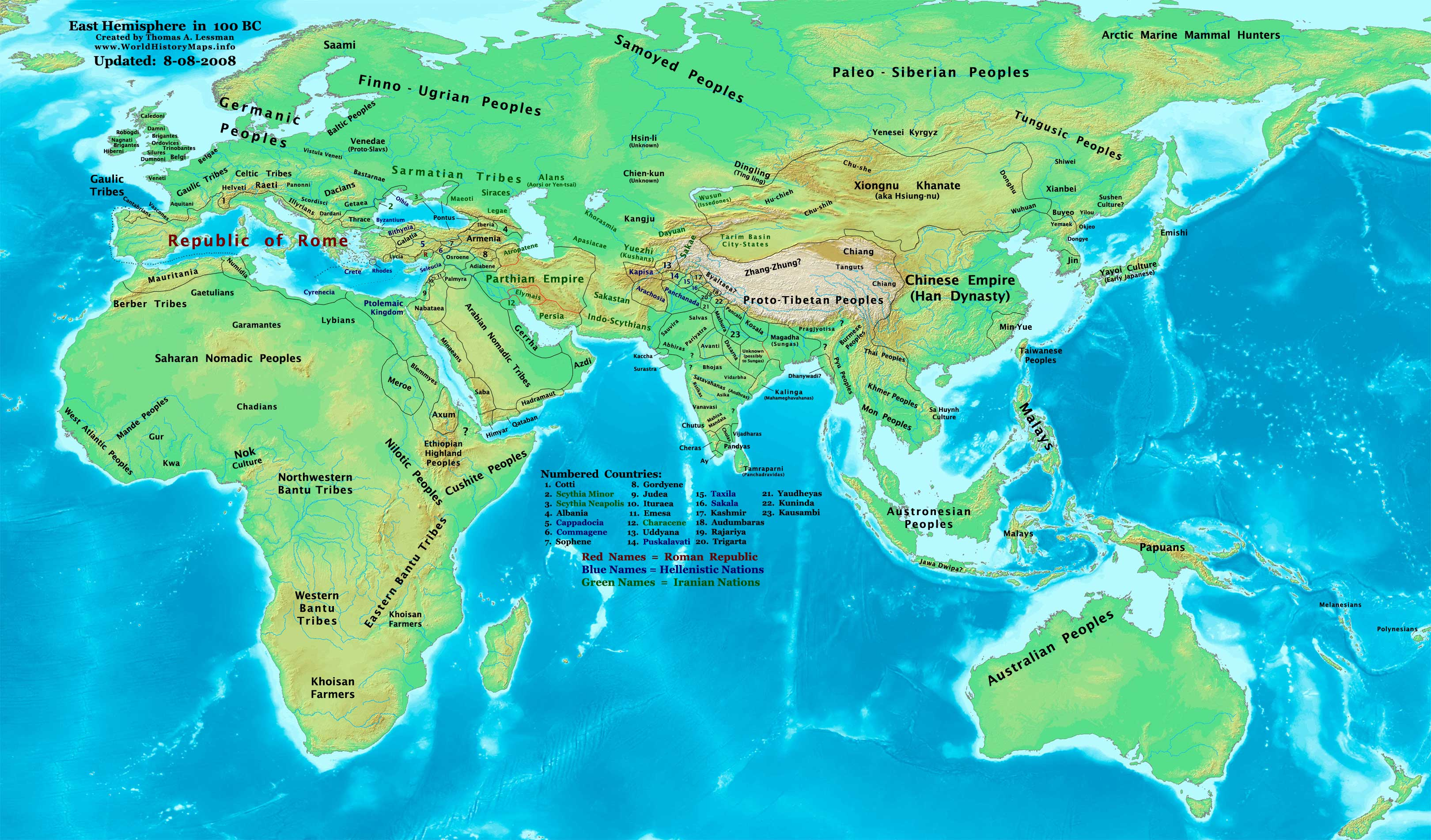
Map of the world in 100 BC

Name	Capital/s	Type	Existed
Âu Lạc	Cổ Loa	Kingdom	257–207 BC
Baekje	Wirye, Ungjin, Sabi	Kingdom	18 BC – 660 AD
Buyeo	Buyeoseong	Kingdom	189 BC – 494 AD
Champa	Indrapura, Vijaya, Panduranga	Kingdom	192–1832 AD
Chengjia	Chengdu	Kingdom	25–36 AD
Chi Tu		Kingdom	100 BC – 7th century AD
Chouchi	Lüeyang	Principality	184–511 AD
Chu	Danyang, JiangYing, JiYing, Shouchun,	Client viscountcy/kingdom	1030–223 BC
Dian		Kingdom	300–109 BC
Donghu		Nomadic tribal confederation	700–150 BC
Dong'ou	Dong'ou	Kingdom	191–111 BC
Funan	Vyadhapura,Óc Eo	Kingdom	60–550 AD
Gangga Negara	Gangga Negara	Kingdom	2nd–11th centuries AD
Gaya	Gaya	Confederacy	42–562 AD
Goguryeo	Jolbon, Gungnae, Pyongyang.	Kingdom	37 BC – 668 AD
Gojoseon	Asadal, Wanggeom-seong	Kingdom	1500–108 BC
Han empire	Chang'an, Luoyang, Xuchang	Empire	206 BC-220 AD
Kofun period (Japan)			300–538
Jin		Tribal federation	550–108 BC
Jolbon		Tribal kingdom	1st century – 37 BC
Kandis kingdom		Kingdom	1st century BC – 13th century AD
Langkasuka	Kedah, Pattani	Kingdom	100–1516 AD
Mahan	Cheonan	Confederacy	98 BC – 250 AD
Minyue	Ye	Kingdom	334–111 AD
Na		Kingdom	1st century – 3rd century AD
Nanyue	Panyu	Kingdom	204–111 BC
Pyu	Sri Ksetra	Federated city states	250 BC – 1085 AD
Qi	Linzi	Client dukedom	1046–221 BC
Qin	Qin, Quanqiu, Qian, Pingyang	Client marquisate/dukedom	858–221 BC
Qin empire	Xianyang	Empire	221–206 BC
Samaskuta kingdom		Kingdom	?–5th century AD
Siljik		Kingdom	102 – 6th century AD
Silla	Gyeongju	Kingdom	55 BC – 935 AD
Sumpa		Tribal chiefdom/client	1600 BC – 7th century AD
Thaton	Thaton	Kingdom	300 BC – 1085 AD
Wei	Anyi, Daliang	Marquisate/kingdom	403–225 BC
Văn Lang	Anyang	Confederation/kingdoms	1430–258 BC
Xianbei		Nomadic (empire)	93–234 AD
Xiongnu		Tribal confederation (empire)	209–155 BC
Yamatai		Kingdom	1st century – 3rd century AD
Yan	Ji	Principality	1046–222 BC
Zhangzhung	Kyunglung	Kingdom	500 BC – 625 AD
Zhou	Haojing, Luoyi	Kingdom	1046–256 BC

== South Asia ==
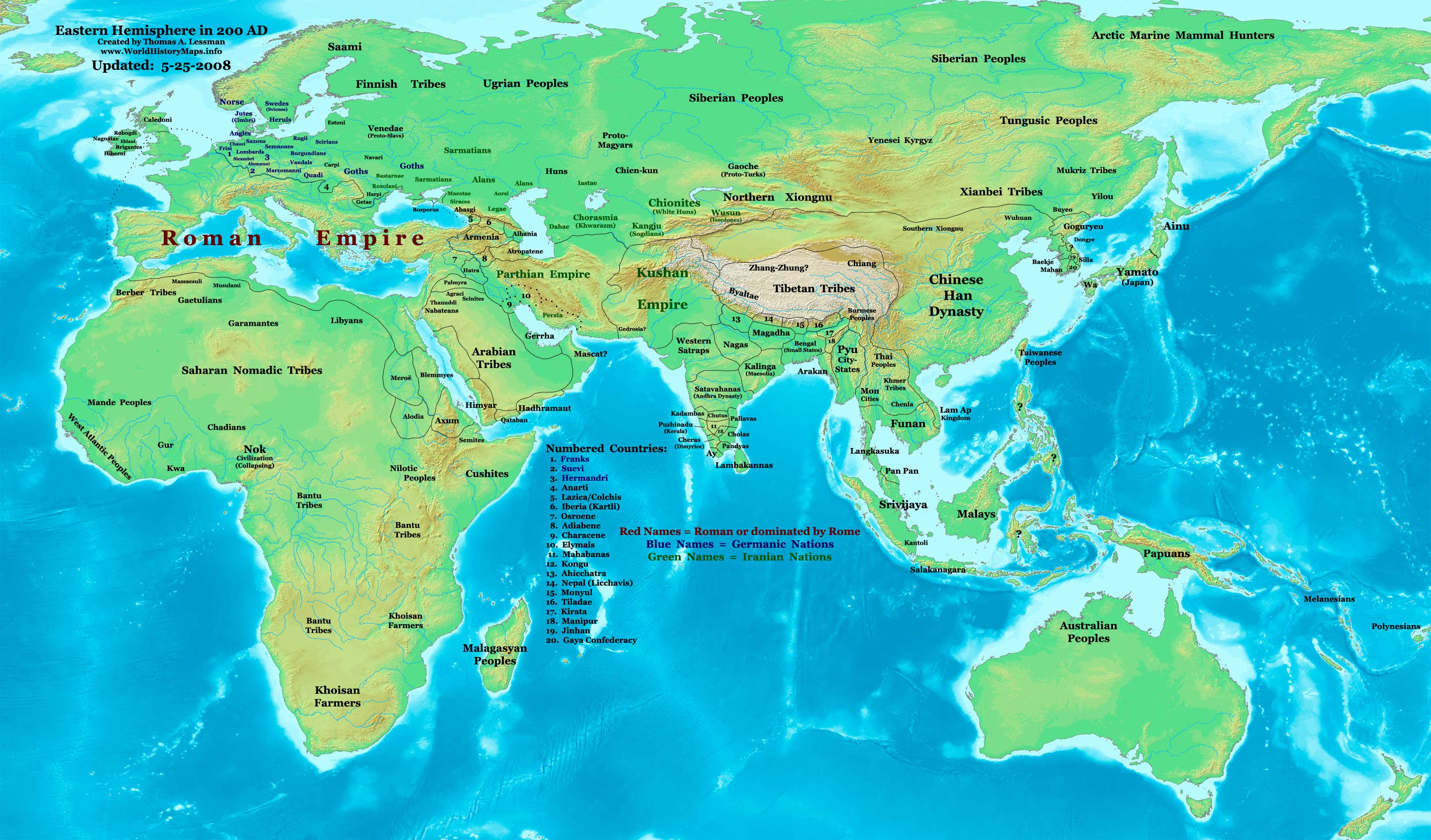
Map of the world in 200 AD

Name	Capital	State type	Existed
Abhira dynasty	Dvaraka	Kingdom	200–315/370 AD
Anuradhapura	Anuradhapura	Kingdom	377 BC – 1017 AD
Anga	Champa or Campā	Kingdom	1380–550 BC
Arjunayanas		Republic	2nd century BC – 6th century AD
Audumbaras	Hoshiarpur	Tribal Kingdom	5th century BC – 4th century AD
Ay	Aykudi	Kingdom	4th century BC – 12th century AD
Chola	Urayur/Kaveripattinam	Kingdom	2645–110 BC
Chutu dynasty	Banavasi	Kingdom	1st century BC – 3rd century AD
Gangaridai	Ganges	Kingdom	450–200 BC
Haryanka	Rajagriha, later Pataliputra	Kingdom	684–413 BC
Indo-Greek	Alexandria in the Caucasus, Taxila, Sagala	Kingdom	180 BC – 10 AD
Indo-Parthia	Taxila	Kingdom	12 BC – 98 AD
Indo-Scythia	Sigal, Taxila, Mathura	Kingdom	200 BC – 400 AD
Kalabhra dynasty	Various	Kingdom	1376–285 BC
Kalinga republic	Dantapura/Rajapura	Republic	3rd–6th century AD
Kamboja	Rajapura	Kingdom	1450–195 BC
Kasmira	Asirgarh Qila	Kingdom	1250–322 BC
Kimpurusha		Kingdom	1000–325 BC
Kosala	Shravasti	Kingdom	1000–266 BC
Kuninda	Shravasti	Kingdom	500 BC – 300 AD
Kushan Empire	Bagram, Peshawar, Taxila, Mathura	Empire	30–375 AD
Maya Rata	Panduwasnuwara	Kingdom	504 BC – 1153 AD
Mahameghavahana dynasty		Kingdom	1st century BC – 4th century AD
Magadha	Rajagriha/Rajgir /Pataliputra	Kingdom	799–323 BC
Malavas		Aristocratic Republic	4th century BC – 7th century AD
Malla	Kusinārā, Pāvā	Republic	c. 7th century–c. 4th century BCE
Mitra dynasty	Mathura	Kingdom	150–50 BC
Maurya Empire	Pataliputra	Empire	322–185 BC
Murunda dynasty		Kingdom	2nd–3rd century AD
Mushika	Ezhimalai	Kingdom	3rd century BC – 4th century AD
Nagas of Padmavati	Padmavati	Kingdom	3rd–4th century AD
Nagas of Vindhyatabi	Vindhyatabi	Kingdom	261–340 AD
Nanda Empire	Pataliputra	Empire	345–322 BC
Panchala	Ahichatra, Kampilya	Kingdom/republic	700–323 BC
Pandya	Madurai	Kingdom	600 BC – 1618 AD
Pallava Empire	Kanchi	Empire	275–897 AD
Pauravas		Kingdom	350–150 BC
Pundra	Pundravardhana	Kingdom	1300 BC – 550 AD
Ruhuna	Magama	Principality	200 BC – 450 AD
Samatata	Samatata	Kingdom	232 BC – 7th c AD
Satavahana Empire	Amaravati	Empire	230 BC – 230 AD
Seleucid Empire	Seleucia, Antioch	Empire	312–63 BC
Shakya	Kapilavatthu	Monarchical Republic	800–320 BC
Shunga Empire	Vidisha	Empire	187–73 BC
Sindhu	Vrsadarbhpura	Kingdom	800–320 BC
Suhma	not specified	Kingdom	c. 8th century – 4th century BC
Surasena	Methora	Kingdom	1000–323 BC
Tambapanni	Tambapanni	Kingdom	543–505 BC
Trigarta	Prasthala	Kingdom	1150–322 BC
Vanga	Gange	Kingdom	1300 BC – 580 AD
Vatsa	Kauśāmbī	Kingdom	1100–323 BC
Vajjika League	Vaishali	Confederacy	c. 7th century BCE – c. 468 BCE
Vrishni	Hoshiarpur	Tribal Kingdom	5th century BC – 4th century AD
Yaudheya	Rohtak	Republic	5th century BC – 4th century AD

== West Asia ==
name	capital	state type	existed
Adiabene	Arbela	Kingdom/client	15–310 AD
Antigonid Empire		Empire	306–168 BC
Araba	Hatra	Kingdom	3rd century BC – 300AD
Armenia	Van	Kingdom	553 BC – 428AD
Armenia Minor		Kingdom	331–72 BC
Atropatene	Ganzak	Kingdom/client	320 BC – 226AD
Awsan	Ḥajar Yaḥirr	Kingdom	8th–7th century BC
Bithynia	Nicomedia, Nicaea	Kingdom/client	297–74 BC
Cappadocia	Mazaca	Kingdom/client	332–130 BC
Chaldea	Bit Yakin	Kingdom	1100–539 BC
Characene	Charax Spasinou	Kingdom	127 BC – 222 AD
Cilicia	Tarsus	Kingdom	795–546 BC
Commagene	Samosata	Kingdom/client	163 BC – 72 AD
Corduene		Principality/kingdom/client	800 BC – 653 AD
Doris	Doris	Kingdom	1200–580 BC
Edom	Rabbath Ammon	Kingdom	1200–125 BC
Elamite empire	Susa	Empire	1210–535 BC
Elymais	Susa	Kingdom/client	147 BC −224 AD
Galatia	Ancyra	Empire	280–64 BC
Gardman	Parisos	Principality/kingdom/client	66–428 AD
Gerrha	Gerrha	Kingdom	650 BC – 300 AD
Greco-Bactria	Bactra, Alexandria (Oxus)	Kingdom	256–125 BC
Hadhramaut		Kingdom	700 BC – 320 AD
Haram	Haram	Kingdom city state	600 – 175 BC
Hasmonean dynasty	Jerusalem	Kingdom/client kingdom	140–37 BC
Heraclea Pontica	Heraclea Pontica	Oligarchic republic	365–284 BC
Himyarite Kingdom	Zafar, later Sana'a	Kingdom	110 BC – 525 AD
Judah	Jerusalem	Kingdom	9th century BC – 586 BC
Kinda	Qaryat Dhāt Kāhil	Tribal kingdom	2nd century BC – 525 AD
Lihyan	Dedan	Kingdom	6th–3rd century BC
Lycaonia	Iconium	Kingdom	340–200 BC
Lycia	Xanthos, Patara	Kingdom	1183–546 BC
Lydian Empire	Sardis	Empire	680–546 BC
Macedonian Empire	Pella	Empire	334–323 BC
Magan		Kingdom	2200–550 BC
Ma'in	?/ Yathill	Kingdom	580–85 BC
Median Empire	Ecbatana	Empire	678–549 BC
Mysia	Pergamon	Kingdom	1320–301 BC
Nabataea	Petra	Kingdom	168 BC – 106 AD
Neo-Babylonian Empire	Babylon	Empire	626–539 BC
Osroene	Edessa	Kingdom/client	134 BC – 244 AD
Paphlagonia	Gangra	Kingdom	1480–183 BC
Pamphylia	Perga	Kingdom	398–190 BC
Parsua		Tribal chiefdom/kingdom	860–600 BC
Parthian Empire	Ctesiphon	Empire	247 BC – 224 AD
Pergamon	Pegamon	Kingdom	282–133 BC
Persian empire	Pasargadae, Persepolis, Susa	Empire	549–330 BC
Pontic empire	Amaseia, Sinope	Empire	250 BC – 68 AD
Pontus	Amaseia, Sinope	Kingdom	281–250 BC
Qataban	Timna	Kingdom	6th century BC – 2nd century AD
Ptolemaic	Alexandria	Kingdom/empire	305–30 BC
Roman Empire	Rome, Constantinople	Empire	27 BC – 1453 AD
Roman Republic	Rome	Republic	509–27 BC
Saba'	Sirwah, Ma'rib	Kingdom	12th/8th century BC – 275 AD
Seleucid Empire	Seleucia, Antioch	Empire	312–63 BC
Sophene	Karkathiokerta	Kingdom	298–94 BC
Zabdicene		Principality/client	780 BC – 5th century AD
Zikirti		Kingdom	750–521 BC

== Americas ==
State	Capital/s	Type	Existed
Maya	Various	Kingdom city states	2000 BC – 900 AD
Mixtec civilization			1500 BC – 1523 AD
Teotihuacan Empire	Teotihuacan	Empire	100 BC–8th century AD
Xochitecatl	Xochitecatl	Kingdom	800 BC – 150 AD

== See also ==
- List of Iron Age states
- List of states during Late Antiquity
- List of states during the Middle Ages
- List of former sovereign states
- List of states in the 6th century BC
- List of states in the 5th century BC
- List of states in the 4th century BC
- List of states in the 3rd century BC
- List of states in the 2nd century BC
- List of states in the 1st century BC
- List of states in the 1st century
- List of states in the 2nd century
- List of ancient great powers
