= List of political entities in the 1st century =

Political entities in the 1st century BC – Political entities in the 2nd century – Political entities by year

This is a list of political entities that existed between 1 AD and 100 AD.

== Political entities ==
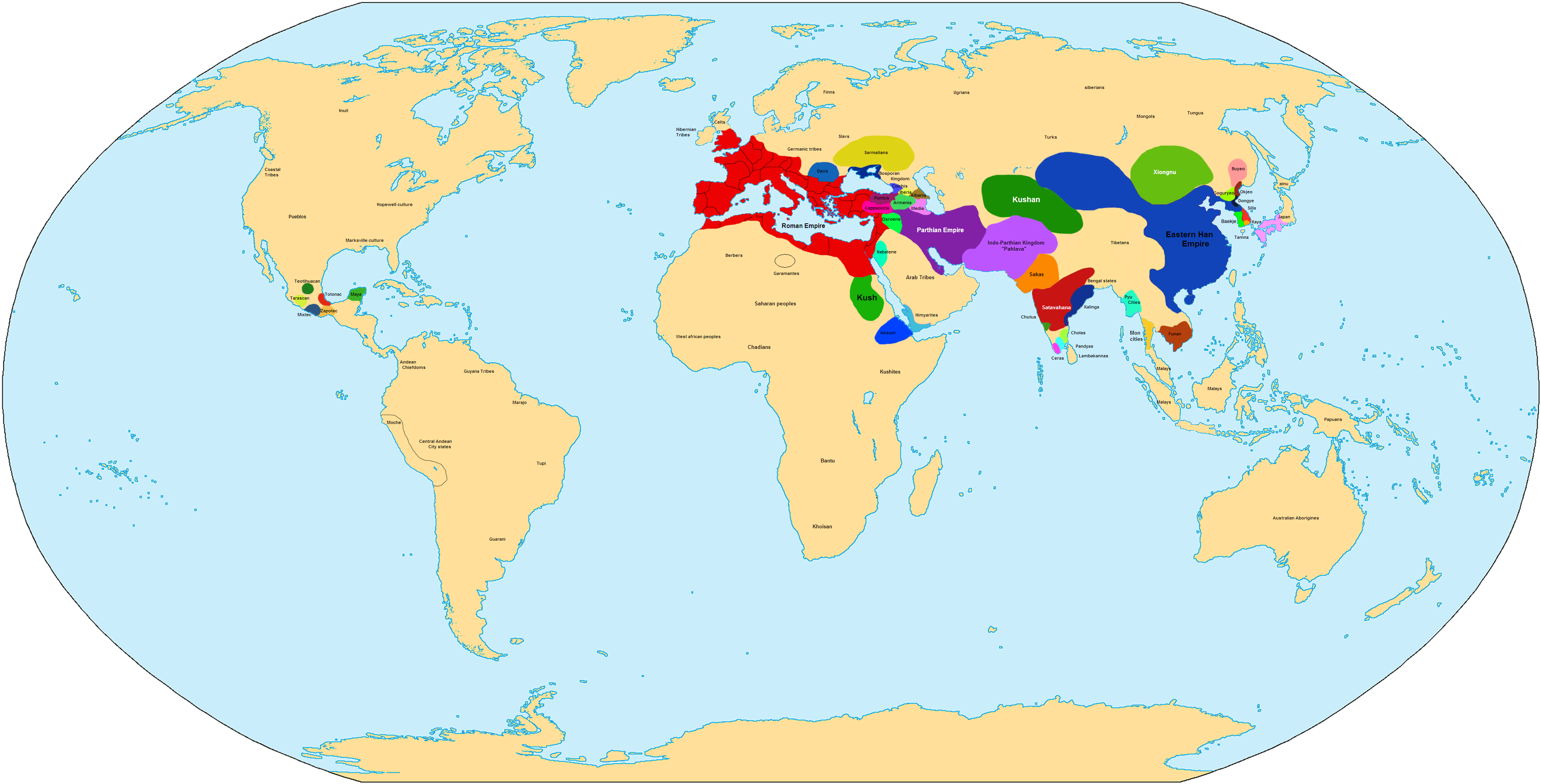
Map of the world in 50 AD

Name	Capital(s)	State type	Existed	Location
Sao civilisation	Various	Tribal city states	6th century BC – 16th century AD	Africa: Central
Garamantes	Garama	Tribal Confederation/Empire	500 BC – 700 AD	Africa: North
Kingdom of Aksum	Aksum, Kubar after 800 AD	Kingdom	c.100 – c.940 AD	Africa: Northeast
Blemmyes		Tribal Kingdom	600 BC – 8th century AD	Africa: Northeast
Kush	Kerma; Napata; Meroe	Kingdom	1070 BC – 350 AD	Africa: Northeast
Gaetulia		Tribal confederation	c. 350 BC – 550 AD	Africa: Northwest
Mauretania	Julia Caesara	Kingdom/Client Kingdom	285 BC – 431 AD	Africa: Northwest
Maya	Various	Kingdom City States	2000 BC – 900AD	Americas: Central
Zapotec	Various	Kingdom City States	700 BC – 1521 AD	Americas: Central
Pueblo	Various	Tribal chiefdoms	12th century BC – 14th century AD	Americas: North
Teotihuacan Empire	Teotihuacan	Empire	100 BC – 8th century AD	Americas: North
Moche	Moche-Trujillo.	United Independent Polities	100 – 800 AD	Americas: South
Nazca	Various	Tribal chiefdoms	100 BC – 800 AD	Americas: South
Basternae	Various	Tribal Confederation	200 BC – 300AD	Europe: Balkans
Dacia	Sarmizegetusa, Regia	Kingdom	700 BC – 106 AD	Europe: Balkans
Odrysia	Seuthopolis	Kingdom	460 BC – 46 AD	Europe: Balkans
Getae		Tribal Kingdom	7th century BC – 4th century AD	Europe: Balkans
Scordisci	Singidunum	Independent tribal state	3rd century BC – 1st century AD	Europe: Balkans
Paeonia		Principality/Kingdom/Client	535 BC – 681 AD	Europe: Balkans
Brigantia		Tribal kingdom	700 BC – c. 2nd AD	Europe: British Isles
Catuvellauni	Verulamium	Tribal kingdom/client	550 BC – 51 AD	Europe: British Isles
Cai		Tribal kingdom	25 – 871 AD	Europe: British Isles
Ce		Tribal kingdom	1st century – 900 AD	Europe: British Isles
Connacht		Tribal chiefdom/kingdom	c. 10th century BC – 1474 AD	Europe: British Isles
Deceangli		Tribal kingdom	500 BC – 76 AD	Europe: British Isles
Cornovii		Tribal kingdom	4th century BC – 343 AD	Europe: British Isles
Iceni	Venta Icenorum	Tribal kingdom/client	500 BC – 64 AD	Europe: British Isles
Fortriu		Tribal kingdom	1 – 850 AD	Europe: British Isles
Iverni	Ivernis	Tribal federated chiefdoms	500 BC – 400 AD	Europe: British Isles
Ordovices		Tribal kingdom	500 BC – c. 1st AD	Europe: British Isles
Meath	Dublin	Kingdom	1st century – 1173 AD	Europe: British Isles
Osraige	Kilkenny	Kingdom	150 – 1185 AD	Europe: British Isles
Silures		Tribal kingdom	650 BC – c. 1st AD	Europe: British Isles
Pictland		Kingdom	250 BC – 850 AD [3]	Europe: British Isles
Cimmerian Bosporus	Panticapaeum	Kingdom/Client	480 BC – 370 AD	Europe: East
Gelonia	Gelonos	Tribal kingdom	5th century BC – 5th century AD	Europe: East
Huns		Nomadic confederation	1st century – 370 AD	Europe: East; Asia: Central
Sarmatians	Tarki (Makhachkala)	Tribal Confederation	450BC – 400 AD	Europe: East
Venedae		Tribal Confederation	400 BC – 7th century AD	Europe: East
Roman Empire	Rome, Constantinople	Empire	27 BC – 1453 AD	Europe: South, West, Balkans, British Isles; Africa: North; Asia: West
Alamannia		Kingdom	213 AD – 496 AD	Europe: West
Cantabri		Tribal confederation	650 BC – 1st century AD	Europe: West
Boii	Felsina	Tribal kingdom	390 BC – 8 AD	Europe: West
Belgae	Various	Tribal confederation	600 BC – c. 1st AD	Europe: West
Astures	Asturica	Tribal federation	550 BC – 68 AD	Europe: West
Alemanni		Tribal Confederation	85 BC – 213 AD	Europe: West
Franks	Various	Tribal Confederation	210 – 481 AD	Europe: West
Helvetii		Tribal confederacy	650 BC – 68 AD	Europe: West
Suebi		Tribal Confederation	60 BC – 409AD	Europe: West
Vindelicia		Tribal kingdom	5th century BC – 1st century AD	Europe: West
Vandals		Tribal chiefdoms	2nd century BC – 409 AD	Europe: West
Caucasian Albania	Kabalak, Partav	Kingdom/Client	65 BC – 628 AD	Eurasian: Caucasus
Commagene	Samosata	Kingdom/client	163 BC – 72 AD	Eurasian: Caucasus
Colchis	Phasis	Kingdom	1300 BC – 2nd century AD	Eurasian: Caucasus
Caspiane		Tribal Kingdom/Client	650 BC – 387 AD	Eurasian: Caucasus
Iberia	Various	Kingdom	302 BC – 580 AD	Eurasian: Caucasus
Lazica	Phasis	Kingdom/client	1st century BC – 7th century AD	Eurasian: Caucasus
Adiabene	Arbela	Kingdom/Client	15 – 310 AD	Asia: West
Araba	Hatra	Kingdom	3rd century BC – 300AD	Asia: West
Armenia	Van	Kingdom	553 BC – 428AD	Asia: West
Awsan	Ḥajar Yaḥirr	Kingdom	7th century BC – 100 AD	Asia: West
Atropatene	Ganzak	Kingdom/Client	320 BC – 226AD	Asia: West
Carmania		Kingdom/client	600 BC – 651 AD	Asia: West
Characene	Charax Spasinou	Kingdom	127 BC – 222 AD	Asia: West
Corduene		Principality/kingdom/client	800 BC – 653 AD	Asia: West
Elymais	Susa	Kingdom/Client	147 BC – 224 AD	Asia: West
Gardman	Parisos	Principality/Kingdom/Client	66 – 428 AD	Asia: West
Ghassanid	Balka, Harith, Petra, Sideir	Kingdom/Client	220 – 712 AD	Asia: West
Khwarezm	Kath, Gurganj	Kingdom	180 BC – 98 AD	Asia: West
Hadhramaut	Shabwah	Kingdom	700 BC – 320 AD	Asia: West
Himyarite Kingdom	Zafar	Kingdom	110 BCE–570 CE	Asia: West
Kindah	Qaryat Dhāt Kāhil	Tribal kingdom	2nd century BC – 525 AD	Asia: West
Nabataea	Petra	Kingdom	168 BC – 106 AD	Asia: West
Osroene	Edessa	Kingdom/Client	134 BC – 244 AD	Asia: West
Palmyrene Empire	Palmyra	Empire	260 – 273 AD	Asia: West
Parthian Empire	Ctesiphon	Empire	247 BC – 224 AD	Asia: West
Qataban	Timna	Kingdom	6th century BC – 2nd century AD	Asia: West
Qedarite	Adumattu	Tribal confederation/client	870 BC – 250 AD	Asia: West
Pontus	Amaseia, Sinope	Empire	250 BC – 68 AD	Asia: West
Parthian Persian Empire	Estakhr, Ctesiphon	Empire	224 – 637 AD	Asia: West, South
Zabdicene		Principality/client	780 BC – 5th century AD	Asia: West
Dayuan		Kingdom/Client	329 BC – 280 AD	Asia: Central
Fergana	Khokand	Kingdom	220 BC – 590 AD	Asia: Central
Kangju		Tribal Federation	280 BC – 585 AD	Asia: Central
Kingdom of Shule	Kashgar	Kingdom/Client	80 – 850 AD	Asia: Central
Khotan	Khotan	Kingdom	56 – 1006 AD	Asia: Central
Kucha	Kucha	Buddhist Kingdom	46 – 658 AD	Asia: Central
Sumpa		Tribal chiefdom/client	1600 BC – 7th century AD	Asia: Central
Tuyuhun	Fuqi	Kingdom	285 – 670 AD	Asia: Central
Anuradhapura	Anuradhapura	Kingdom	377 BC – 1017 AD	Asia: South
Ay	Aykudi	Kingdom	4th century BC – 12th century AD	Asia: South
Indo-Parthian Kingdom	Taxila	Kingdom	12 BC – 98 AD	Asia: South
Indo-Greek Kingdom	Alexandria in the Caucasus, Taxila, Sagala	Kingdom	180 BC – 10 AD	Asia: South
Chera Kingdom		Kingdom	5th century BC – 1102 AD	Asia: South
Indo-Scythians	Sigal, Taxila, Mathura	Kingdom	200 BC – 400 AD	Asia: South
Kuninda	Shravasti	Kingdom	500 BC – 300 AD	Asia: South
Kushan Empire	Various	Empire	30 – 375 AD	Asia: South, Central
Mushika	Ezhimalai	Kingdom	3rd century BC – 4th century AD	Asia: South
Pallava Empire	Kanchi	Empire	250 BC – 800 AD	Asia: South
Pundra	Pundravardhana	Kingdom	1300 BC – 550 AD	Asia: South
Rajarata	Various	Kingdom	377 BC – 1310 AD	Asia: South
Ruhuna	Magama	Principality	200 BC – 450 AD	Asia: South
Satavahana Empire	Vatsagulma	Empire	250 – 500 AD	Asia: South
Vakataka Empire	Amaravati	Empire	230 BC – 230 AD	Asia: South
Vanga	Gange	Kingdom	1300 BC – 580 AD	Asia: South
Western Satraps	Ozone, Barygaza	Kingdom	35 – 405 AD	Asia: South
Champa	Various	Kingdom	192 – 1832 AD	Asia: Southeast
Chi Tu		Kingdom	100 BC – 7th century AD	Asia: Southeast
Funan	Various	Kingdom	60 – 550 AD	Asia: Southeast
Langkasuka	Kedah, Pattani	Kingdom	100 – 1516 AD	Asia: Southeast
Pyu city-states	Sri Ksetra	Federated City States	250 BC – 1085 AD	Asia: Southeast
Thaton Kingdom	Thaton	Kingdom	300 BC – 1085 AD	Asia: Southeast
Cao Wei	Various	Kingdom	220 – 265 AD	Asia: East, China
Chouchi	Lüeyang	Principality	184 – 511 AD	Asia: East, China
Duan		Tribal Chiefdom/Dukedom	250 – 338 AD	Asia: East, China
Eastern Wu	Wuchang, Jianye	Kingdom	229 – 280 AD	Asia: East, China
Han Empire	Various	Empire	206 BC – 220 AD	Asia: East, China
Shu Han	Chengdu	Kingdom	221 – 263 AD	Asia: East, China
Xianbei state		Nomadic (Empire)	93 – 234 AD	Asia: East, China
Na		Kingdom	1st century – 3rd century AD	Asia: East, Japan
Yamatai		Kingdom	1st century – 3rd century AD	Asia: East, Japan
Baekje	Various	Kingdom	18 BC – 660 AD	Asia: East, Korean Peninsula
Baekje		Kingdom	18 BC – 660 AD	Asia: East, Korean Peninsula
Buyeo	Buyeoseong	Kingdom	189 BC – 494 AD	Asia: East, Korean Peninsula
Dongye		Chiefdom	3rd century BC – 5th century AD	Asia: East, Korean Peninsula
Gaya confederacy	Gaya	Confederacy	42 – 562 AD	Asia: East, Korean Peninsula
Goguryeo	Various	Kingdom	37 BC – 668 AD	Asia: East, Korean Peninsula
Mahan confederacy	Cheonan	Confederacy	98 BC – 250 AD	Asia: East, Korean Peninsula
Okjeo		Tribal state	2nd century BC – 5th century AD	Asia: East, Korean Peninsula
Samhan		Confederacy	1st century BC – 4th century AD	Asia: East, Korean Peninsula
Siljik		Kingdom	102 – 6th century AD	Asia: East, Korean Peninsula
Silla	Gyeongju	Kingdom	55 BC – 935 AD	Asia: East, Korean Peninsula

== See also ==
- List of Bronze Age states
- List of Iron Age states
- List of Classical Age states
- List of states during Late Antiquity
- List of states during the Middle Ages

List of political entities in the 1st century
Preceded by 1st century BC	Political entities of the 1st century	Succeeded by 2nd century
