= List of political entities in the 6th century BC =

Political entities in the 7th century BC – Political entities in the 5th century BC – Political entities by century

This is a list of sovereign states or polities that existed in the 6th century BC.

== Africa ==
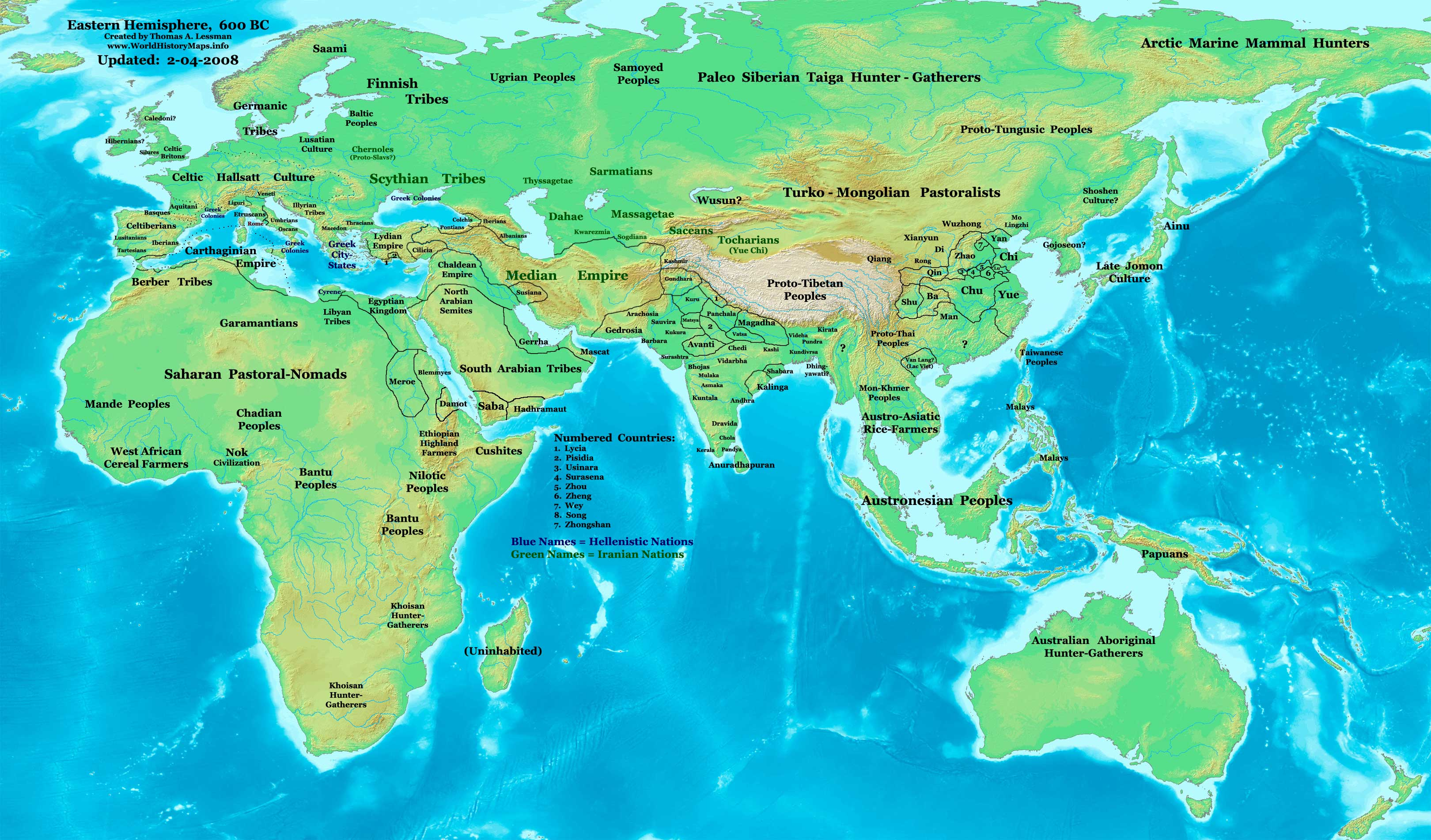
Map of the world in 600 BC

| State | Existed |
|---|---|
| Aethiopia | c. 13th – 5th centuries BC |
| Sheba | C. 1000/800 BC - 275 AD |
| Blemmyes | 600 BC – 8th century AD |
| Carthaganian Empire | 650–146 BC |
| Kingdom of D'mt | 980–400 BC |
| Kingdom of Cyrene | 631–525 BC |
| Kingdom of Egypt | 1069–525 BC |
| Garamantian Empire | 1000 BC – 700 AD |
| Kingdom of Kush | 1070 BC – 350 AD |
| Libu | 1550–146BC |
| Macrobia | c. 8th – 4th centuries BC |
| Mauri | 580–285 BC |
| Nok | 1000 BC – 300 AD |
| Persian Empire | 525–330 BC |
| Sao | 6th century BC – 6th century AD |

== Americas ==
| name | existed |
|---|---|
| Chavín | 900 BC - 250 BC |
| Maya | 2000 BC – 900 AD |
| Olmec | 1400-400 BC |
| Paracas | 800–100 BC |
| Pueblo | 1100 BC - Now |
| Zapotec | 700 BC – 1521 AD |

== Europe ==
=== North and West ===
| name | existed |
|---|---|
| Belgae | 600–52 BC |
| Brigantia | 700 BC – 76 AD |
| Caledonia | 650 BC – 1st century AD |
| Catuvellauni | 550 BC – 51 AD |
| Connacht | c. 10th century BC – 1474 AD |
| Deceangli | 500 BC – 76 AD |
| Helvetii | 650 BC – 68 AD |
| Iceni | 500 BC – 64 AD |
| Iverni | 500 BC – 400 AD |
| Ordovice | 500 BC – |
| Silure | 650 BC – |

=== South and East ===
| State | Existed |
|---|---|
| Aquitani | 550–27 BC |
| Kingdom of Arcadia | 980–743 BC |
| Kingdom of Acarnania | 7th – 1st century BC |
| Kingdom of Argolis | 1200–337 BC |
| Astures | 550 BC – 68 AD |
| Republic of Athens | 1068–146 BC |
| Cantabri | 650 BC – 1st century AD |
| Carthaganian Empire | 650–146 BC |
| Celtici | 600–19 BC |
| Celtiberia | 650–19 BC |
| Corinthia | 700–338 BC |
| Dacia | 700 BC – 106 AD |
| Kingdom of Etruria | 768–264 BC |
| Getae | 7th century BC – 4th century AD |
| Iapydes | 9th century – 34 BC |
| Illyria | 2000–168 BC |
| Liburnia | 11th century – 34 BC |
| Kingdom of Locria | 1250–386 BC |
| Lucania | 1000–356 BC |
| Magna Graecia | 740–89 BC |
| Oenotria | 1000–325 BC |
| Paeonia (kingdom) | 535 BC – 681 AD |
| Padanian Etruria | 9th century – 5th century BC |
| Persian Empire | 549–330 BC |
| Phocis | 690–222 BC |
| Roman Republic | 509–27 BC |
| Kingdom of Sabinum | c. 760–494 BC |
| Samnium | c. 600–82 BC |
| Sicels | c. 11th century – 425 BC |
| Kingdom of Sparta | 950–146 BC |
| Kingdom of Thessaly | 950–344 BC |
| Tartessos | 1000–450 BC |
| Thrace | 1500–450 BC |
| Umbria | 9th century – 3rd century BC |
| Veneti | 6th century – 218 BC |

== Eurasian Steppe and Central Asia ==
| name | existed |
|---|---|
| Aria | 700 BC – 300 BC |
| Caspiane | 650 BC – 387 AD |
| Bactria | 1200–550 BC |
| Kingdom of Balhara | 12th – 7th centuries BC |
| Bulgar | 7th century BC – 7th century AD |
| Chorasmia | 1290-180 BC |
| Kingdom of Colchis | 1300 BC – 2nd century AD |
| Dahae | 700–530 BC |
| Huns | 600 BC – 370 AD |
| Issedon | 650-58 BC |
| Magyar | 1100 BC – 895 AD |
| Massagatae | 600–46 BC |
| Persian Empire | 549–330 BC |
| Qiang | 2000 BC – 150 BC |
| Scythia | 690BC-250 BC |
| Sogdiana | 750–550 BC |
| Thyssagetae | 650 BC – 110 AD |
| Xianyun | 824-209 BC |

== East Asia ==
| Name | Existed |
|---|---|
| Ba (state) | 13th century – 311 BC |
| Cai (state) | 980–447 BC |
| Cao (state) | 1053–487 BC |
| Chen (state) | 1046–479 BC |
| Chu (state) | 1030–223 BC |
| Donghu | 1400–150 BC |
| Kingdom of Gojoseon | 2333–108 BC |
| Jin (Korean state) | 550–108 BC |
| Jin state | 1042–376 BC |
| Pi (state) | 1046–418 BC |
| Qiang | 2000 BC – 150 BC |
| Qi (Henan) | 1600–445 BC |
| Qi (state) | 1046–221 BC |
| Qin (state) | 858–221 BC |
| Quanrong | 954–301 BC |
| Sui (state) | 771–221 BC |
| Sumpa | 1600 BC – 7th century AD |
| Shu (state) | 1046–316 BC |
| Teng (state) | 1046–414 BC |
| Kingdom of Van Lang | 2879–258 BC |
| Xu (state) | 2000–512 BC |
| Yan (state) | 1046–222 BC |
| Zhongshan (state) | 580–296 BC |
| Zhou Kingdom | 1046–256 BC |
| Zou (state) | 1012–350 BC |

== South Asia ==
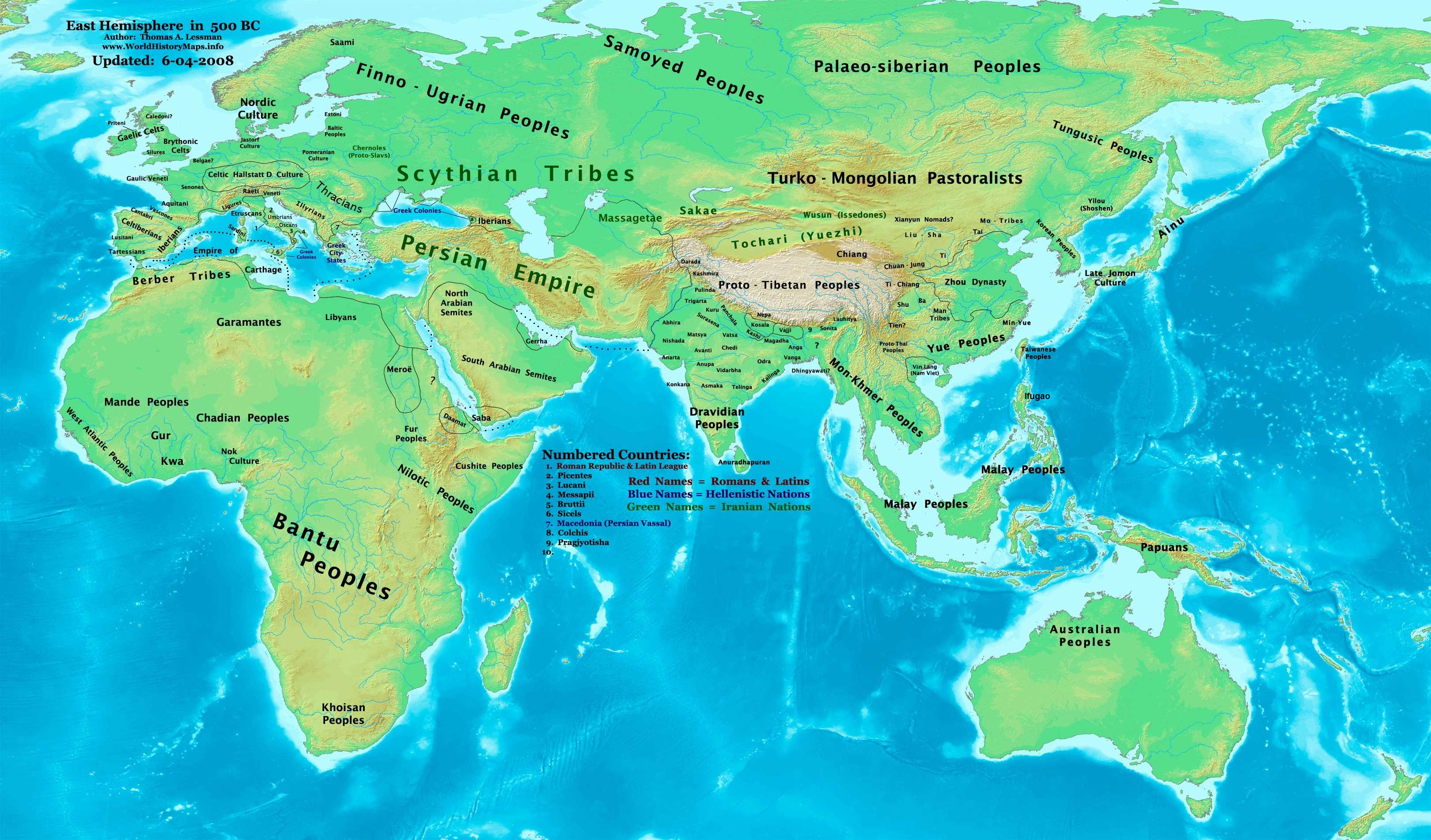
Map of the world in 500 BC

| Name | Existed |
|---|---|
| Anarta kingdom | 1100–550 BC |
| Anga kingdom | 1380–550 BC |
| Avanti kingdom | 900–322 BC |
| Danda kingdom | 1100–450 BC |
| Haryanka kingdom | 684–413 BC |
| Kalinga kingdom | 1376–285 BC |
| Kamboja kingdom | 1450–195 BC |
| Kasmira kingdom | 1250–322 BC |
| Kimpurusha kingdom | 1000–325 BC |
| Kirata kingdom | 1350 – c. 300 BC |
| Kosala kingdom | 1000–266 BC |
| Magadha kingdom | 1000–323 BC |
| Maldivian Solar Dynasty | 953–573 BC |
| Malla republics | c. 7th century BCE – c. 4th century BCE |
| Matsya kingdom | 1180–318 BC |
| Panchala | 700–323 BC |
| Pandya kingdom | 1350–460 BC |
| Parvata kingdom | c. 9th century – 325 BC |
| Persian Empire | 549–330 BC |
| Pundra kingdom | 1300 BC – 550 AD |
| Shakya Republic | 800–320 BC |
| Sindhu kingdom | 800–320 BC |
| Sinhala kingdom | 700–543 BC |
| Surasena | 1000–323 BC |
| Tambapanni | 543–505 BC |
| Trigarta kingdom | 1150–322 BC |
| kingdom of Upatissa Nuwara | 505–377 BC |
| Vanga kingdom | 1300 BC – 580 AD |
| Vatsa | 1100–323 BC |
| Vajjika League | c. 7th century BCE – c. 468 BCE |
| Yaksha kingdom | 1200–350 BC |

== West Asia ==
| state type | existed |
|---|---|
| Kingdom of Armenia | 553 BC – 428 AD |
| Kingdom of Awsan | 7th century BC – 100 AD |
| Sheba | C. 1000/800 BC - 275 AD |
| Kingdom of Caria | 11th – 6th century BC |
| Carmania | c. 7th century – 550 BC |
| Kingdom of Chaldea | 1100–539 BC |
| Kingdom of Cilicia | 795–546 BC |
| Principality of Corduene | 800 BC – 653 AD |
| Kingdom of Doris | 1200–580 BC |
| Kingdom of Edom | 1200–125 BC |
| Elamite Empire | 1210–535 BC |
| Gedrosia | 600 BC – |
| Kingdom of Hadhramaut | 700 BC – 320 AD |
| Kingdom of Haram | 600–175 BC |
| Kingdom of Lycia | 1183–546 BC |
| Kingdom of Magan | 2200–550 BC |
| Kingdom of Ma'in | 580–85 BC |
| Median Empire | 678–549 BC |
| Mysia | 1320–301 BC |
| Neo-Babylonian Empire | 626–539 BC |
| Kingdom of Paphlagonia | 1480–546 BC |
| Parsua | 860–600 BC |
| Persian Empire | 549–330 BC |
| Kingdom of Qataban | 6th century BC – 2nd century AD |
| Principality of Zabdicene | 780 BC – 5th century AD |
| Kingdom of Za'in | 800 BC-756 BC |

== See also ==
- List of Bronze Age states
- List of Iron Age states
- List of Classical Age states
- List of states during Late Antiquity
- List of states during the Middle Ages

List of political entities in the 6th century BC
| Preceded by 7th century BC | Sovereign states of the 6th century BC | Succeeded by 5th century BC |
