= List of political entities in the 5th century BC =

The development of states—large-scale, populous, politically centralized, and socially stratified polities/societies governed by powerful rulers—marks one of the major milestones in the evolution of human societies. Archaeologists often distinguish between primary (or pristine) states and secondary states. Primary states evolved independently through largely internal developmental processes rather than through the influence of any other pre-existing state. The earliest known primary states appeared in Mesopotamia c. 3700 BC, in Egypt c. 3300 BC, in the Indus Valley c. 2500 BC, India c. 1700 BC, and in China c. 1600 BC. As they interacted with their less developed neighbors through trade, warfare, migration, and more generalized ideological influences, the primary states directly or indirectly fostered the emergence of secondary states in surrounding areas, for example, the Hittites in Anatolia, the Minoan and Mycenaean states of the Aegean, or the Nubian kingdoms in the Sudan. According to Professor Gil Stein of the University of Chicago Oriental Institute, "The excavations and archaeological surveys of the last few decades have vastly increased both the quantity and quality of what we know about ancient states and urbanism. Archaeologists have broadened the scope of their research beyond the traditional focus on rulers and urban elites. Current research now aims at understanding the role of urban commoners, craft specialists, and village-based farmers in the overall organization of ancient states and societies. Given the immense geographical scope encompassed by the term 'the Ancient World'". The notion of a sovereign state arises in the 16th century with the development of modern diplomacy. For earlier times, the term "sovereign state" is an anachronism. What corresponded to sovereign states in the medieval and ancient period were monarchs ruling by the grace of God, de facto feudal or imperial autocrats, or de facto independent nations or tribal confederations. This is a list of sovereign states that existed between 500 BC and 401 BC.

== Sovereign states ==
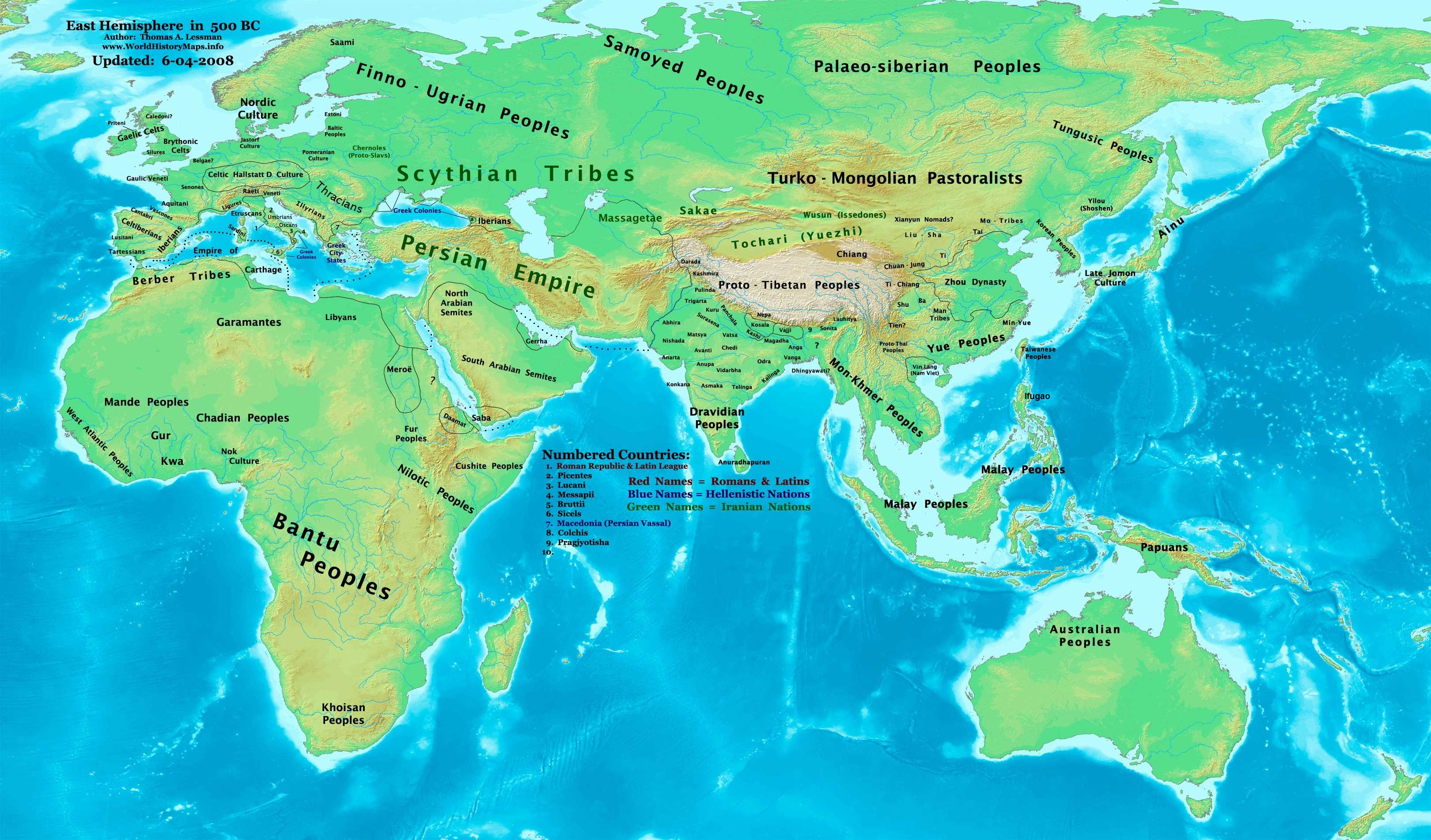
Map of the world in 500 BC

Sovereign state	Years
Achaemenid Empire	550–330 BC
Adena culture	1000–200 BC
Ammon	c. 10th century BC – 332 BC
Anga	1380–550 BC
Athens	510–322 BC
Avanti	900–322 BC
Bithynia	297–74 BC
Cappadocia	320 BC – 17 AD
Carthaginian Empire	650–146 BC
Chavín culture	900–200 BC
Chedi	600–300 BC
Chen	855–479 BC
Chera	5th century BC – 1102 AD
Chola	2645 BC – 1279 AD
Chorrera	1800–300 BC
Chu	1030–223 BC
Colchis	1300 – 2nd century AD
Corinth	700–338 BC
Cyrene	631–525 BC
Dʿmt	c. 980 BC – c. 400 BC
Dardanian kingdom	c.448 BC – 28 BC
Edom	1200–125 BC
Gandhara	800 BC–500 AD
Gojoseon	2333–108 BC
Han	403–230 BC
Kalinga	1376–285 BC
Kamboja	1450–195 BC
Kasi	600–345 BC
Kikata	2000–1700 BC
Kosala	1000–266 BC
Kuru	1376–285 BC
Kush	1070 BC – 350 AD
Lu	856–256 BC
Lycaonia	8th century–200 BC
Macedonia	8th century–146 BC
Mahajanapadas	600–345 BC
Malla Republics	c. 7th–4th century BC
Mannai	1110–616 BC
Maya civilization	2000 BC – 900 AD
Minaea	580–85 BC
Moab	1300–400 BC
Mysia	1320–301 BC
Nanda Empire	424–321 BC
Olmec	1400–400 BC
Panchala	700–323 BC
Pandya	1350–460 BC
Paphlagonia	1480–183 BC
Paracas culture	600–175 BC
Pisidia	8000 BC – 11th century AD
Qi	1046–241 BC
Qin	845–221 BC
Roman Republic	509–27 BC
Saba	12th/8th century BC – 275 AD
Scythia	8th century BC – 2nd century AD
Sparta	11th century – 195 BC
Surasena	1000–323 BC
Ta Netjeru/Land of Punt	2400–1069 BC
Thebes	3200–30 BC
Vajjika League	c. 7th century BC – c. 468 BC
Văn Lang	2879–258 BC
Vatsa	1100–323 BC
Wei	403–225 BC
Yan	865–222 BC
Zapotec civilization	700 BC – 1521 AD
Zheng	806–375 BC
Zhou	1045–256 BC

== See also ==
- List of Bronze Age states
- List of Iron Age states
- List of Classical Age states
- List of states during Late Antiquity
- List of states during the Middle Ages

List of political entities in the 5th century BC
Preceded by 6th century BC	Sovereign states of the 5th century BC	Succeeded by 4th century BC
