= Samaskuta kingdom =

Kingdom in Southeast Asia

Samaskuta was an ancient kingdom in Sumatra's interior, at the location of present-day Lake Singkarak. Little is known about its founding, but the kingdom is known to have existed before the eruption of Krakatoa in the 5th century. It is believed that the kingdom sank into Lake Singkarak after the volcanic explosion. In the book Pararaton, Prabhava Sangkala is mentioned as the king of Samaskuta in AD 416.
