= Zikirti =

Ancient kingdom in the northern Zagros (750–521 BC)

Zikirti or Zikirtu, (also: Zikirta, Zikurti, Zekertu) was an ancient kingdom (750-521 BC), in the north of the Zagros Mountains, which comprised the easternmost part of Greater Mannaea. Geographically it corresponds with the modern counties of Takab and Shahin Dezh in northwestern Iran.

== See also ==
- Urartians
