= Outline of ancient history =

Overview of and topical guide to ancient history

The following outline is provided as an overview of and topical guide to ancient history:

Ancient history – study of recorded human history from the beginning of writing at about 3000 BC until the Early Middle Ages. The times before writing belong either to protohistory or to prehistory. The span of recorded history is roughly 5,000 – 5,500 years, beginning with Sumerian cuneiform, the oldest form of writing discovered so far. Although the ending date of ancient history is disputed, currently most Western scholars use the fall of the Western Roman Empire in 476 AD or the coming of Islam in 632 AD as the end of ancient history.

== Nature of ancient history ==
=== What type of thing is ancient history? ===
Ancient history can be described as all of the following:

=== Essence of ancient history ===
- Timeline of ancient history

== Periodization ==
Periods in the Ancient Western world

- Classical antiquity
  - Timeline of classical antiquity
  - Archaic period in classical antiquity (c. eighth to c. sixth centuries BC)
    - Iron Age Europe
    - Archaic Greece
  - Classical Greece (fifth to fourth centuries BC)
  - Hellenistic period (323 BC to 146 BC)
  - Roman Republic (fifth to first centuries BC)
  - Roman Empire (first century BC to fifth century AD)
- Late Antiquity (fourth to seventh centuries AD)

=== Ordinal periods ===
- 5th millennium BC
- 4th millennium BC
  - 40th century BC
  - 39th century BC
  - 38th century BC
  - 37th century BC
  - 36th century BC
  - 35th century BC
  - 34th century BC
  - 33rd century BC
  - 32nd century BC
  - 31st century BC
- 3rd millennium BC
  - 30th century BC
  - 29th century BC
  - 28th century BC
  - 27th century BC
  - 26th century BC
  - 25th century BC
  - 24th century BC
  - 23rd century BC
  - 22nd century BC
  - 21st century BC
- 2nd millennium BC
  - 20th century BC
  - 19th century BC
  - 18th century BC
  - 17th century BC
  - 16th century BC
  - 15th century BC
  - 14th century BC
  - 13th century BC
  - 12th century BC
  - 11th century BC
- 1st millennium BC
  - 10th century BC
  - 9th century BC
  - 8th century BC
  - 7th century BC
  - 6th century BC
  - 5th century BC
  - 4th century BC
  - 3rd century BC
  - 2nd century BC
  - 1st century BC
- first millennium
- 1st millennium
  - 1st century
  - 2nd century
  - 3rd century
  - 4th century
  - 5th century

== Ancient history by region ==
=== Ancient geographical regions ===
==== Ancient Africa ====
Ancient African history

- Ancient West Africa
- Ancient North Africa
  - Africa (Roman province)
  - Ancient Egypt
    - History of ancient Egypt
    - List of ancient Egyptian sites
    - List of ancient Egyptian towns and cities
  - Ancient Carthage
  - Ancient Libya
    - Cyrenaica
  - Mauretania
    - Mauretania Caesariensis
    - Mauretania Sitifensis
    - Mauretania Tingitana
- Ancient Central Africa
- Ancient East Africa
- Ancient Southern Africa

==== Ancient Asia ====
Ancient Asia

- Ancient Near East (alphabetical)
  - Achaemenid Empire (First Persian Empire)
  - Ancient history of Cyprus
  - History of ancient Egypt (see Egypt under Ancient Africa, above)
  - Macedonian Empire
  - Mesopotamia
    - Sumer
    - Akkadian Empire
    - Babylonia
    - Assyria
  - Parthian Empire (Second Persian Empire)
  - Sasanian Empire (Third Persian Empire)
  - Ancient history of Yemen
- Ancient East Asia
  - Ancient China
    - Historical capitals of China (includes a chronology which includes ancient times)
  - Ancient Japan
- Ancient South Asia
  - Ancient India
    - List of ancient Indian cities

==== Ancient Europe ====
Ancient Europe

- the territory of Europe (the continent according to its modern definition) in "ancient times":
  - Bronze Age Europe
    - Macedonian Empire
  - Iron Age Europe
    - Roman imperial period (chronology)
    - Roman Iron Age
  - List of ancient cities in Italy
- the territories of Europe participating in Classical Antiquity
  - Ancient Greece
  - Ancient Rome
    - Ancient history of Transylvania

==== Ancient Mediterranean region ====
- Ancient Mediterranean Sea
  - Ancient Aegean Sea
    - Aegean civilizations
      - Ancient history of the islands in the Aegean Sea
        - Ancient Cyclades
          - Ancient Amorgos
          - Ancient Anafi
          - Ancient Andros
          - Ancient Antiparos
          - Ancient Delos
          - Ancient Folegandros
          - Ancient Ios (island)
          - Ancient Kea (island)
          - Ancient Kimolos
          - Ancient Kythnos
          - Ancient Milos
          - Ancient Mykonos
          - Ancient Naxos (island)
          - Ancient Paros
          - Ancient Santorini
          - Ancient Serifos
          - Ancient Sifnos
          - Ancient Syros
          - Ancient Tinos
  - Ancient Sicily
  - Sea of Sardinia
    - Ancient Balearic Islands
    - Ancient Corsica
    - Ancient Sardinia

==== Cradles of civilization ====
- Fertile Crescent
  - Ancient Mesopotamia

=== Ancient political entities ===
==== Ancient states ====
===== Ancient states, by era =====
- List of Bronze Age states
- List of Classical Age states
- List of Iron Age states
- List of states during Late Antiquity

===== Ancient states, by ordinal period =====
- List of sovereign states in the 35th century BC
- List of sovereign states in 3500 BC
- List of sovereign states in the 3rd millennium BC
  - List of sovereign states in the 21st century BC
  - List of sovereign states in the 20th century BC
- List of sovereign states in the 19th century BC
- List of sovereign states in the 17th century BC
- List of sovereign states in the 16th century BC
- List of sovereign states in the 15th century BC
- List of sovereign states in the 14th century BC
- List of sovereign states in the 13th century BC
- List of sovereign states in the 12th century BC
- List of sovereign states in the 11th century BC
- List of sovereign states in the 10th century BC
- List of sovereign states in the 9th century BC
- List of sovereign states in the 8th century BC
- List of sovereign states in the 7th century BC
- List of sovereign states in the 6th century BC
- List of sovereign states in the 5th century BC
- List of sovereign states in the 4th century BC
- List of sovereign states in the 3rd century BC
- List of sovereign states in the 2nd century BC
- List of sovereign states in the 1st century BC
- List of political entities in the 1st century
- List of political entities in the 2nd century
- List of political entities in the 3rd century
- List of political entities in the 4th century
- List of political entities in the 5th century

=== Ancient sites ===
- List of ancient cities in Illyria
- List of ancient cities in Serbia
- List of ancient cities in Thrace and Dacia

=== Place these? ===
- Ammon
- Canaan
- Chaldea
- Babylonia
- Ur
- Uruk
- Eridu
- Kish
- Girsu
- Nippur
- Lagash
- Elam
- Larsa
- History of ancient Israel and Judah
- Samaria
- Edom
- Judea

== Ancient government and politics ==
- Political institutions of ancient Rome

=== Ancient law ===
- Ancient Greek law
- Roman law
- Traditional Chinese law

== Ancient culture ==
Ancient culture

=== Ancient architecture ===
Ancient architecture

- Ancient Egyptian architecture
  - Ancient pyramid
- Ancient Greek architecture
  - Ancient Greek temple
- Ancient Roman architecture
- Ancient monument
  - Ancient monuments in Ujjain
- Architecture of the ancient Near East
  - Ancient synagogues in Israel
  - Ancient synagogues in Palestine
- Ancient constructions of Sri Lanka
  - Ancient stupas of Sri Lanka

=== Ancient art ===
Ancient art

- Art by culture
  - Ancient Greek art
- Art by type
  - Ancient dance
    - Dance in ancient Egypt
    - Dance in ancient Greece
  - Ancient music
    - Music of ancient Rome
  - Ancient poetry
    - Ancient epic poetry
    - Greek lyric
  - Ancient sculpture
    - Ancient Greek sculpture
  - Ancient theatre
    - Theatre of ancient Greece
    - Theatre of ancient Rome

=== Ancient cuisine ===
- Ancient Egyptian cuisine
- Ancient Greek cuisine
- Ancient Roman cuisine
  - Ancient Rome and wine
- List of ancient dishes
- Ancient Israelite cuisine

=== Ancient language ===
Ancient language

- Ancient Greek
  - Ancient Greek dialects
  - Ancient Greek grammar
    - Ancient Greek grammar (tables)
    - Ancient Greek nouns
    - Ancient Greek verbs
  - Ancient Greek personal names
  - Ancient Greek phonology
- Ancient Hebrew language
- Latin
- Ancient Macedonian language

=== Ancient literature ===
Ancient literature

- Ancient Egyptian literature
- Ancient Greek literature
  - Ancient Greek novel
- Ancient Hebrew writings

=== Ancient people ===
- List of ancient Greek tribes
- List of ancient peoples of Italy
- Notable people from ancient history
- Hittites
  - Biblical Hittites
- Hasmoneans
- Habiru
- Israelites

=== Ancient philosophy ===
Ancient philosophy

- Ancient Egyptian philosophy
- Ancient Greek philosophy

=== Ancient religion ===
Ancient religion

- Ancient Egyptian religion
  - Ancient Egyptian concept of the soul
  - Ancient Egyptian creation myths
  - Ancient Egyptian deities
  - Ancient Egyptian funerary practices
    - Ancient Egyptian funerary texts
  - Egyptian mythology
- Ancient Greek religion
  - Ancient Greek funeral and burial practices
  - Ancient Greek temple
  - Greek mythology
    - Ancient Greek flood myths
- Ancient Mesopotamian religion
- Religion in ancient Rome
  - Religious persecution in the Roman Empire

== Ancient history by subject ==
- Ancient empires
- Ancient glass trade
  - Ancient Chinese glass
- Ancient maritime history
- Ancient money

== Ancient economics and infrastructure ==
- Roman commerce

=== Ancient agriculture ===
- Agriculture in Mesoamerica
- Agriculture in ancient Africa
  - Ancient Egyptian agriculture
    - Ancient Egyptian cattle
- Agriculture in ancient Greece
- Roman agriculture
- Agriculture in ancient Tamil country
- Ancient grains
- Ancient woodland

== Ancient education ==
- Ancient university

== Ancient science and technology ==
- Ancient science
  - Ancient Egyptian mathematics
    - Ancient Egyptian multiplication
  - History of science in classical antiquity
    - Ancient Greek astronomy
- History of science and technology in the Indian subcontinent
- Ancient technology
  - By civilization
    - Ancient Egyptian technology
      - History of timekeeping devices in Egypt
    - Ancient Greek technology
    - Roman technology
      - Roman engineering
  - By technology type
    - Ancient medicine
      - Ancient Egyptian medicine
        - Ancient Egyptian anatomical studies
      - Ancient Greek medicine
      - Ancient Iranian medicine
    - Ancient shipbuilding techniques

=== Slavery in ancient times ===
- Slavery in ancient Egypt
- Slavery in ancient Greece
- Slavery in ancient Rome

=== Ancient sport ===
- Ancient Greek boxing
- Ancient Greek Olympic festivals

=== Ancient warfare ===
Ancient warfare

- Ancient armies
  - Ancient Macedonian army
- Ancient navies and vessels
  - Ancient Egyptian navy
- Ancient Greek warfare
- Ancient Macedonian battle tactics
  - Ancient Roman defensive walls
  - Ancient Roman military clothing

=== Wonders of the ancient world ===
- Seven wonders of the ancient world
  1. Great Pyramid of Giza
  2. Hanging Gardens of Babylon
  3. Statue of Zeus at Olympia
  4. Temple of Artemis at Ephesus
  5. Mausoleum at Halicarnassus
  6. Colossus of Rhodes
  7. Lighthouse of Alexandria

== History of ancient history ==
- Archaeology
  - Classical archaeology (Greece and Rome)
    - Etruscology (Etruria)
  - Near Eastern archeology
    - Assyriology (Mesopotamia)
    - Egyptology (Egypt)
- Historiography
  - Greek historiography
    - Historiography of Alexander the Great
  - Roman historiography
    - Historiography of the fall of the Western Roman Empire

== Notable people from ancient history ==
- List of ancient Egyptians
- List of ancient Greeks
- List of ancient Macedonians
- List of ancient Romans

=== Leaders from ancient times ===
- Pericles

== See also ==
Development note: the following topics need placement in the outline above

- Ancient Chinese states
- Ancient Chinese urban planning
- Ancient Chinese wooden architecture
- Ancient Egyptian flint jewelry
- Ancient Egyptian offering formula
- Ancient Egyptian retainer sacrifices
- Ancient Egyptian royal titulary
- Ancient Egyptian solar ships
- Ancient Egyptian trade
- Ancient Egyptian units of measurement
- Ancient Greek Musical Notation
- Ancient Greek Numbers
- Ancient Greek accent
- Ancient Greek clubs
- Ancient Greek coinage
- Ancient Greek comedy
- Ancient Greek eros
- Ancient Greek military personal equipment
- Ancient Greek units of measurement
- Ancient Macedonian calendar
- Ancient Mediterranean piracy
- Ancient Mesopotamian units of measurement
- Ancient Roman bathing
- Ancient Roman pottery
- Ancient Roman units of measurement
- Ancient borough
- Ancient document
- Ancient economic thought
- Ancient furniture
- Ancient higher-learning institutions
- Ancient iron production
- Ancient kingdoms of Anatolia
- Ancient monuments of Java
- Ancient settlements in Turkey
- Ancient solution
- Ancient towns in Saudi Arabia
- Ancient trackway
- Ancient underground quarry, Jordan Valley
- Ancient veena
- Ancient vessel
- Ancient Roman sarcophagi
