= List of political entities in the 15th century BC =

Political entities in the 16th century BC – Political entities in the 14th century BC – Political entities by century

This is a list of political entities in the 15th century BC (1500–1401 BC).

== Sovereign states ==
Sovereign state	Years
Akkadian Empire	2334 – 2193 BC
Amorite	2000 – 1595 BC
Armi	2290 – 40 BC
Aramea	2300 – 700 BC
Arzawa	2300 – 1200 BC
Assyria	2025 – 911 BC
Alashiya	1450 – 1050 BC
Athens	1556 – 355 BC
Babylonia	1894 – 732 BC
Byblos	1800 – 970 BC
Chorrera	1800 – 300 BC
Dardania	1527 – 1183 BC
Dilmun	2600 – 675 BC
Ebla	3500 – 1600 BC
Egypt	3050 – 1550, 1077 – 322 BC
Egyptian Empire	1550 – 1077 BC
Elam	2800 – 550 BC
Eshnuna	2000 – 8th century BC
Gandhara	1450 – 510 BC
Gojoseon	2333 – 108 BC
Gutium	2108 – 2089 BC
Hatti	2700 – 1900 BC
Hitti	1900 – 1600 BC
Hittite Empire	1600 – 1178 BC
Hyksos	1800 – 1178 BC
Kassite Empire	1531 – 1135 BC
Illyria	2000 – 168 BC
Indus	3100 – 1300 BC
Kamboja	1450 – 195 BC
Kaskia	1430 – 1200 BC
Kizzuwatna	1600 – 1220 BC
Kussara	1900 – 1650 BC
Libu	1550 – 630 BC
Lukka	2000 – 1183 BC
Lullubi	2400 – 650 BC
Luvia	2300 – 1400 BC
Magan	2200 – 550 BC
Mari	2900 – 1759 BC
Minoa	2700 – 1420 BC
Mittani	1690 – 1300 BC
Mycenaea	1600 – 1100 BC
Mygdonia	16th century BC – 6th century BC
Namar	2350 – 750 BC
Paphlagonia	1480 – 183 BC
Phrygia	1450 – 1200 BC
Purushanda	2000 – 1650 BC
Punt	2400 – 1069 BC
Qi	1600 – 445 BC
Qiang	2000 BC – 150 BC
Sea Peoples	c. 2000 – 1175 BC
Shang China	1600 – 1046 BC
Sumeria	2900 – 1674 BC
Sumpa	1600 BC – 7th century AD
Thrace	1500 – 450 BC
Tyre	1500 – 990 BC
Ugarit	2500 – 1090 BC
Upper Mesopotamia	1809 – 1776 BC
Văn Lang	2879 – 258 BC
Xu	2000 – 512 BC

== See also ==
- List of Bronze Age states
- List of Classical Age states
- List of Iron Age states
- List of states during late Antiquity
- List of state leaders in the 15th century BC
