= List of political entities in the 18th century BC =

Political entities in the 19th century BC – Political entities in the 17th century BC – Political entities by century

This is a list of political entities in the 18th century BC (1800–1701 BC).

== Sovereign states ==
Sovereign state	Years
Amorite	2000–1595 BC
Armi	2290–40 BC
Aramea	2300–700 BC
Arzawa	2300–1200 BC
Assyria –	2025–611 BC
Babylonia	1894–532 BC
Byblos	1800–970 BC
Chorrera	1800–300 BC
Dilmun	2600–675 BC
Ebla	3500–1600 BC
Egypt	3050–32 BC
Elam	2800–550 BC
Eshnuna	2000 – 8th century BC
Gojoseon	2333–108 BC
Hatti	2700–1900 BC
Hitti	1900–1600 BC
Hyksos	1800–1178 BC
Illyria	2000–168 BC
Indus	3100–1300 BC
Kussara	1900–1650 BC
Lukka	2000–1183 BC
Lullubi	2400–650 BC
Luvia	2300–1400 BC
Magan	2200–550 BC
Mari	2900–1759 BC
Minoa	2700–1420 BC
Namar	2350–750 BC
Purushanda	2000–1650 BC
Punt	2400–1069 BC
Qiang	2000–150 BC
Sea Peoples	c. 2000 – 1175 BC
Sumeria	2900–1674 BC
Ugarit	2500–1090 BC
Upper Mesopotamia	1809–1776 BC
Văn Lang	2879–258 BC
Xia	2205–1600 BC
Xu	2000–512 BC

== See also ==
- List of Bronze Age states
- List of Classical Age states
- List of Iron Age states
- List of states during Antiquity
- List of state leaders in the 18th century BC
