= List of political entities in the 19th century BC =

Political entities in the 20th century BC – Political entities in the 18th century BC – Political entities by century

This is a list of political entities in the 19th century BC.

== States ==
| Sovereign state | Years |
|---|---|
| Amorite | 2000 – 1595 BC |
| Armi | 2290 – 40 BC |
| Aramea | 2300 – 700 BC |
| Arzawa | 2300 – 1200 BC |
| Assyria | 2025 – 911 BC |
| Babylonia | 1894 – 732 BC |
| Dilmun | 2600 – 675 BC |
| Ebla | 3500 – 1600 BC |
| Egypt | 3050 – 1550 BC, 1077 – 322 BC |
| Elam | 2800 – 550 BC |
| Eshnuna | 2000 – 8th century BC |
| Gojoseon | 2333 – 108 BC |
| Hatti | 2700 – 1900 BC |
| Hitti | 1900 – 1600 BC |
| Illyria | 2000 – 168 BC |
| Indus | 3100 – 1300 BC |
| Kussara | 1900 – 1650 BC |
| Lukka | 2000 – 1183 BC |
| Lullubi | 2400 – 650 BC |
| Luvia | 2300 – 1400 BC |
| Magan | 2200 – 550 BC |
| Mari | 2900 – 1759 BC |
| Minoa | 2700 – 1420 BC |
| Namar | 2350 – 750 BC |
| Purushanda | 2000 – 1650 BC |
| Punt | 2400 – 1069 BC |
| Qiang | 2000 BC – 150 BC |
| Sumeria | 2900 – 1674 BC |
| Ugarit | 2500 – 1090 BC |
| Upper Mesopotamia | 1809 – 1776 BC |
| Văn Lang | 2879 – 258 BC |
| Xia | 2205 – 1600 BC |
| Xu | 2000 – 512 BC |

== See also ==
- List of Bronze Age states
- List of Classical Age states
- List of Iron Age states
- List of states during Antiquity
- List of state leaders in the 19th century BC
