= List of political entities in the 13th century BC =

Political entities in the 14th century BC – Political entities in the 12th century BC – Political entities by century

This is a list of political entities in the 13th century BC (1300–1201 BC).

== Sovereign states ==
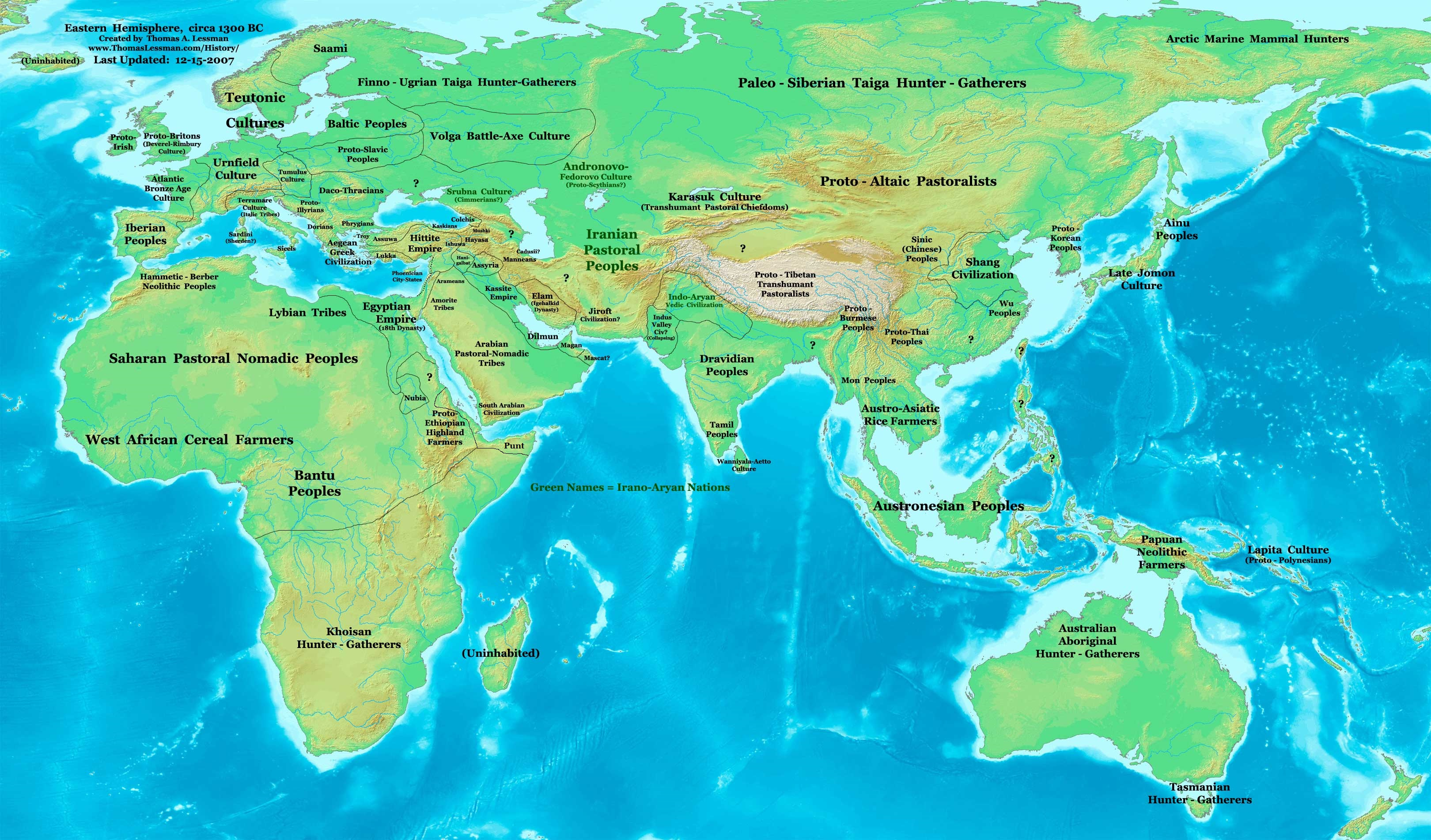
Map of the old world in 1300 BC

| Sovereign state | Years |
|---|---|
| Ahhiyawa | 1450 – 1220 BC |
| Anga | 1380 – 550 BC |
| Armi | 2290 – 40 BC |
| Aramea | 2300 – 700 BC |
| Aram Damascus | 12th century BC – 734 BC |
| Arzawa | 2300 – 1200 BC |
| Assyria | 2025 – 911 BC |
| Assuwa | 1300 – 1250 BC |
| Alashiya | 1450 – 1050 BC |
| Athens | 1556 – 355 BC |
| Ba | 13th century – 311 BC |
| Babylonia | 1894 – 732 BC |
| Bashan | 1330 – 928 BC |
| Byblos | 1800 – 970 BC |
| Karuwa | 1250 – 560 BC |
| Chedi | 1250 – 344 BC |
| Chola | 2645 BC – 1279 AD |
| Chorasmia | 1290 – 180 BC |
| Chorrera | 1800 – 300 BC |
| Colchis | 1300 BC – 2nd century AD |
| Crestonia | 14th century BC – 431 BC |
| Dardania | 1527 – 1183 BC |
| Dilmun | 2600 – 675 BC |
| Donghu | 1400 – 150 BC |
| Ebla | 3500 – 1600 BC |
| Egyptian Empire | 3050 – 322 BC |
| Elam | 2800 – 550 BC |
| Eshnuna | 2000 – 8th century BC |
| Gandhara | 1450 – 510 BC |
| Gojoseon | 2333 – 108 BC |
| Gutium | 2108 – 2089 BC |
| Hittite Empire | 1600 – 1178 BC |
| Hyksos | 1800 – 1178 BC |
| Kassite Empire | 1531 – 1135 BC |
| Illyria | 2000 – 168 BC |
| Indus | 3100 – 1300 BC |
| Kalinga | 1376 – 285 BC |
| Kamboja | 1450 – 195 BC |
| Kasmira | 1250 – 322 BC |
| Kaskia | 1430 – 1200 BC |
| Kekeya | 1250 – c. 4th century BC |
| Kikata | 2000 – 1700 BC |
| Kirata | 1350 – c. 300 BC |
| Kizzuwatna | 1600 – 1220 BC |
| Kosala | 1300 – 266 BC |
| Kuru | 1376 – 285 BC |
| Kussara | 1900 – 1650 BC |
| Locria | 1250 – 386 BC |
| Libu | 1550 – 630 BC |
| Lukka | 2000 – 1183 BC |
| Lullubi | 2400 – 650 BC |
| Luvia | 2300 – 1400 BC |
| Lycia | 1183 – 546 BC |
| Madra | 1350 – 350 BC |
| Magan | 2200 – 550 BC |
| Matsya | 1250 – 318 BC |
| Messenia | 1300 – 724 BC |
| Mycenaea | 1600 – 1100 BC |
| Mygdonia | 16th century BC – 6th century BC |
| Mysia | 1320 – 301 BC |
| Namar | 2350 – 750 BC |
| Olmec | 1400 – 400 BC |
| Pandya | 1350 – 460 BC |
| Paphlagonia | 1480 – 183 BC |
| Phrygia (Balkan's) | 1450 – 1200 BC |
| Pundra | 1300 BC – 550 AD |
| Punt | 2400 – 1069 BC |
| Qi | 1600 – 445 BC |
| Qiang | 2000 – 150 BC |
| Quan | 1250 – 704 BC |
| Sea Peoples | c. 2000 – 1175 BC |
| Shang China | 1600 – 1046 BC |
| Sumpa | 1600 BC – 7th century AD |
| Thrace | 1500 – 450 BC |
| Tyre | 1500 – 990 BC |
| Sindhu | 1300 – 320 BC |
| Ugarit | 2500 – 1090 BC |
| Vanga | 1300 BC – 580 AD |
| Văn Lang | 2879 – 258 BC |
| Xu | 2000 – 512 BC |

== See also ==
- List of Bronze Age states
- List of Classical Age states
- List of Iron Age states
- List of states during late Antiquity
- List of state leaders in the 13th century BC
