= List of political entities in the 21st century BC =

This is a list of political entities in the 21st century BC.

== Political entities ==
Entities	Years	Ref
Akkadian Empire	2334–2193 BC	
Armi	2290–2240 BC	
Aramea	2300–700 BC	
Arzawa	2300–1200 BC	
Assyria	2025–911 BC	
Dilmun	2600–675 BC	
Ebla	3500–1600 BC	
Egypt	3050–1550, 1077–322 BC	
Elam	2800–550 BC	
Gojoseon	2333–108 BC	
Gutium	2108–2089 BC	
Hatti	2700–1900 BC	
Illyria	2000–168 BC	
Indus	3100–1300 BC	
Lullubi	2400–650 BC	
Luvia	2300–1400 BC	
Magan	2200–550 BC	
Mari	2900–1759 BC	
Minoa	2700–1420 BC	
Namar	2350–750 BC	
Purushanda	2000–1650 BC	
Punt	2400–1069 BC	
Sumeria	2900–1674 BC	
Ugarit	2500–1090 BC	
Văn Lang	2879–258 BC	
Xia	2070–1600 BC (dates uncertain)	

== See also ==
- List of Bronze Age states
- List of Iron Age states
- List of Classical Age states
- List of states during Late Antiquity
