= Copper Age state societies =

Polities extant at some time in 5000 BC to 3300 BC

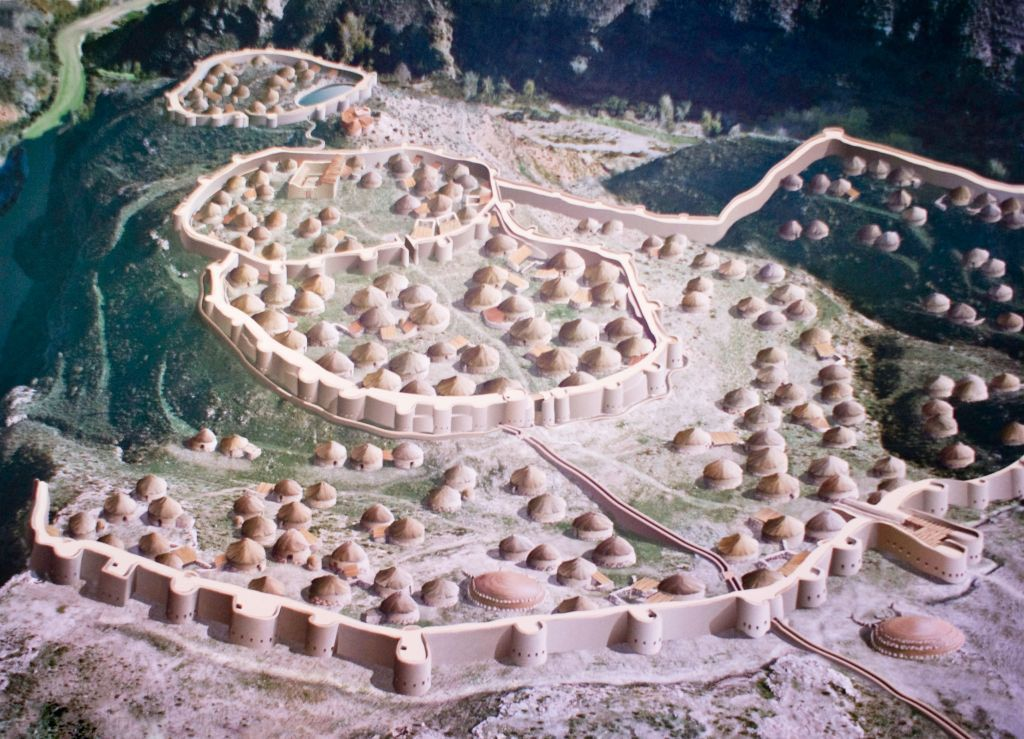
Painting of a Copper Age walled settlement, Los Millares, Spain

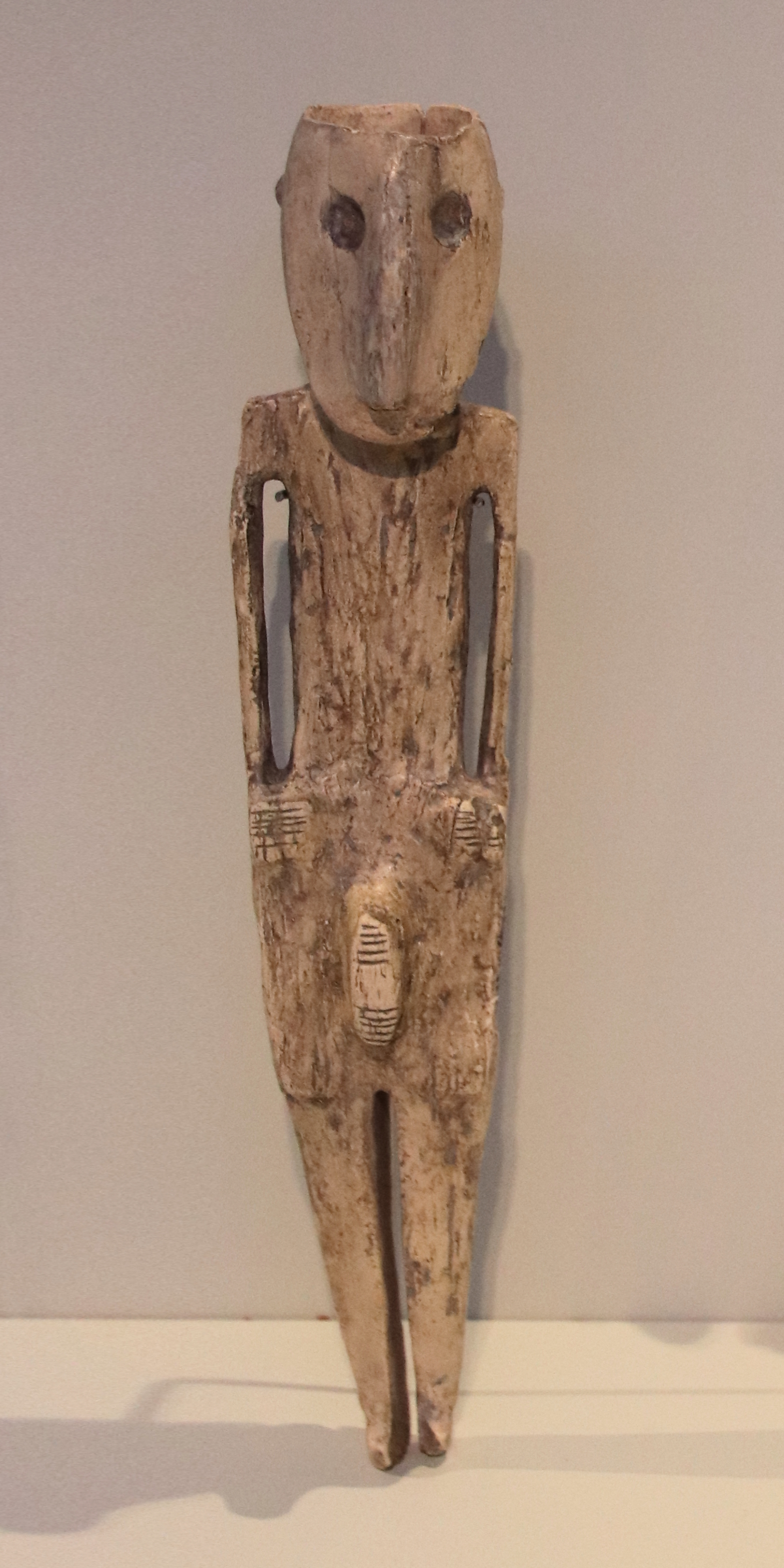
Levant Chalcolithic male figurine, 4500–3500 BC

The Chalcolithic or Copper Age is the transitional period between the Neolithic and the Bronze Age. It is taken to begin around the mid-5th millennium BC, and ends with the beginning of the Bronze Age proper, in the late 4th to 3rd millennium BC, depending on the region.

The Chalcolithic is part of prehistory, but based on archaeological evidence, the emergence of the first state societies can be inferred, notably in the Fertile Crescent (notably Sumer) Predynastic Egypt, and Proto-Minoan Crete, with late Neolithic societies of comparable complexity emerging in the Indus Valley (Mehrgarh), China, and along the north-western shores of the Black Sea.

The development of states—large-scale, populous, politically centralized, and socially stratified polities/societies governed by powerful rulers—marks one of the major milestones in the evolution of human societies. Archaeologists often distinguish between primary (or pristine) states and secondary states. Primary states evolved independently through largely internal developmental processes rather than through the influence of any other pre-existing state.

The earliest known primary states appeared in Anatolia c. 5200 BC, in Mesopotamia c. 3700 BC,, in Greece c. 3500 BC, in Egypt c. 3300 BC, in the Indus Valley c. 3300 BC, and in China c. 1600 BC.

== List of known polities ==
City	Location (Countries)	period
Anau	Turkmenistan	4000 BC to 1000 BC
Anshan	Iran	4000 BC to 1000 BC
Bad-tibira	Iraq	5000 BC to 2300 BC
Çatalhöyük	Turkey	7500 BC to 5700 BC
Güvercinkayası	Turkey	5200 BC to 4750 BC
Ebla	Syria	3500 BC to 1600 BC
Eridu	Iraq	5400 BC to 2050 BC
Girsu	Iraq	5000 to 2100 BC
Heliopolis (Lower Egypt)	Egypt	3500 BC to ~1000BC
Isin	Iraq	3500 to 2100 BC
Jericho	Palestine	9600 BC to 1400 BC
Kish	Iraq	4000 to 2300 BC
Knossos	Greece	7000 to 1900 BC
Lagash	Iraq	4000 to 2250 BC
Laish	Israel	4500 to 1350 BC
Mari	Syria	2900 to 1759 BC
Mehrgarh	Pakistan	5500 to 2500 BC
Nekhen (Upper Egypt)	Egypt	3500 BC to ~150BC
Nippur	Iraq	5000 to 2450 BC
Susa	Iran	4200 to 2330 BC
Rakhigarhi	India	6500 BC to 1900 BC
Ugarit	Syria	6000 BC to 1190 BC
Ur	Iraq	4000 to 2000 BC
Uruk	Iraq	4000 to 3100 BC
Tell Brak	Syria	6500 to 1600 BC
Göbekli Tepe	Turkey	9600 to 7000 BC
Aşıklı Höyük	Turkey	8200 to 7400 BC
Tell Halula	Syria	7400 to 6200 BC

== See also ==
- 4th millennium BC
- Cradle of civilization
- List of Bronze Age states
- List of Iron Age states
