= King of Battle =

Ancient Mesopotamian epic tale

The King of Battle (šar tamḫāri) is an ancient Mesopotamian epic tale of Sargon of Akkad and his campaign against the city of Purušḫanda in the Anatolian highlands and its king, Nur-Daggal (Note: Where the Hittite version, ^{l}Nu-úr-da-aḫ-ḫi, mistakes the GAN in ^{l}ZALAG-^{d}da-gan for ḪÉ.) or Nur-Dagan, in aid of his merchants. It is extant in five manuscripts: two (Note: EA 359 Cairo 48396, SR 12223 in the Egyptian Museum, Cairo.) (Note: EA 375 BM 134866 in the British Museum, London) from Amarna in Egypt, six fragments (Note: Tablet fragments KBo 3.9 (Bo 2400); KBo 3.10 (Bo 7333); KBo 12:1 (110/t); KBo 13.46 (624/u); KBo 22.6 (Bo 68/28) published in CTH 310; and KUB 48.98 (Bo 3715).) of one from the Hittite capital Ḫattuša from the middle Babylonian period and one each from Aššur (Note: VAT 10290 KAV 138 in the Vorderasiatisches Museum Berlin.) and Nineveh, (Note: K.13228 in the British Museum Kouyunjik collection.) probably from the Neo-Assyrian period. Of the twenty-three tales composed of the Kings of Akkad, this was one of only three, along with the Birth Legend of Sargon and the Cuthean Legend of Naram-Sin, to continue to circulate in the Neo-Assyrian and Neo-Babylonian periods, some 1,500 years after the events they describe. It is thought to have been committed to writing during the first half of the second millennium, perhaps following a lengthy oral tradition, although the circumstances of its composition are hotly debated.

== Synopsis ==
Responding to the grievances of his merchants, Sargon declares his intention to his reluctant warriors to forge a campaign into Anatolia to conquer its principal town Purušḫanda, whose tyrannical ruler has been oppressing the expatriate Akkadian tradesmen. The soldiers’ apprehension was due to their anticipation of the tribulations afforded by the great distance and uncertainty of the venture. He rallies them with promises of victory based on his consultation with the goddess Ištar in her temple during which he falls into a deep sleep to receive her prophecy. The army faces many hardships while crossing the Tigris and in their onward journey. They struggle through mountain passes strewn with impenetrable thickets and great boulders of lapis lazuli. (Note: NA_{4}.ZA.GÌN.)

The god Enlil warns Nur-Dagan of the approaching Sargonic horde but reassures him that he will be safe. He addresses his warriors, telling them that the remoteness of Purušḫanda has protected it from all other foes in the past and predicting a similar outcome on this occasion, a prediction that is subsequently overturned by Sargon’s sudden and complete subjugation of the city. As Sargon is crowned king of Purušḫanda before the city gate, Nur-Dagan makes a humiliating submission of defeat and declares that Sargon has no equal.

A lengthy time later, some variants: 3 years, Sargon prepares to depart Purušḫanda and return to Akkad. His soldiers protest that they should not leave empty-handed and consequently fell three trees standing at the gate-house. The various manuscripts of the epic show differing narrative details, although their fragmentary state may exaggerate the apparent differences.

=== Principal publications ===
- Ernst F Weidner (1922). Der Zug Sargons von Akkad nach Kleinasien (Boghazköi Studien 6). J. C. Hinrichs'sche.
- W. G. Lambert (1963). "A New Fragment of the King of Battle". Archiv für Orientforschung. 20: 161–162.
- Anson F. Rainey (1978). El-Amarna Tablets 359-379, 2nd edition, revised (AOAT 8). Butzon und Bercker. pp. 10–15, 52–53.
- S. Franke (1989). Das Bild der König von Akkad in ihren Selbstzeugnissen und der Überlieferung (Ph.D. Diss.). University of Hamburg.
- Shlomo Izre’el (1997). The Amarna Scholarly Tablets. Styx. pp. 66–75, 87–88.
- Joan Goodnick Westenholz (1997). Legends of the Kings of Akkade. Eisenbrauns. pp. 102–139.
