= Agriculture in ancient Tamil country =

During the Sangam age, 700 BCE – 100 CE, agriculture was the main vocation of the Tamil. It was considered a necessity for life, and hence was treated as the foremost among all occupations. The farmers or the Ulavar were placed right at the top of the social classification. As they were the producers of food grains, they lived with self-respect. Agriculture during the early stages of Sangam period was primitive, but it progressively got more efficient with improvements in irrigation, ploughing, manuring, storage and distribution. The ancient Tamils were aware of the different varieties of soil, the kinds of crops that can be grown on them and the various irrigation schemes suitable for a given region. These were also in Madras, Thanjore (now as Chennai, Thanjavur respectively).

== Land classification ==
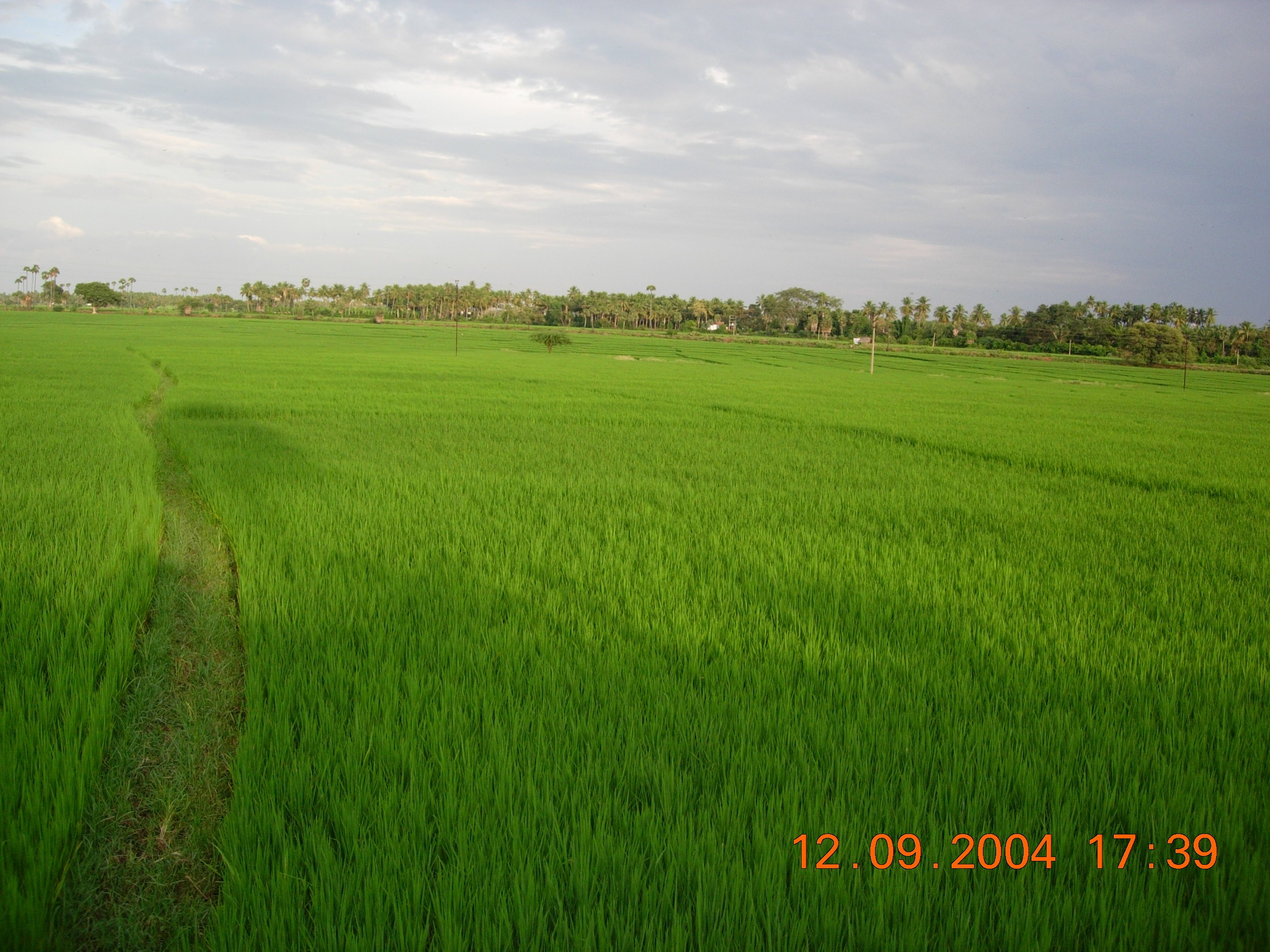
Paddy fields in present-day Tamil Nadu

Among the five geographical divisions of the Tamil country in Sangam literature, the Marutam region was the most fit for cultivation, as it had the most fertile lands. The prosperity of a farmer depended on getting the necessary sunlight, seasonal rains and the fertility of the soil. Among these elements of nature, sunlight was considered indispensable by the ancient Tamils, because if rains fail other methods of irrigation could be put to use and if the soil wasn't naturally fertile, artificial manuring would enrich the soil. They differentiated the lands on the basis of fertility and accordingly cultivated the crops that were best suited for the kind of soil. They were Vanpulam (hardland), Menpulam (fertile land), Pinpulam (dry land) and Kalarnilam or Uvarnilam (salty land). Vanpulam in Mullai and Kurinji regions did not yield rich produce, whereas in Menpulam the yield was very good. Dry crops were cultivated on Pinpulam, because of the limited irrigation facilities. The Kalarnilam was unfit for cultivation. Some of the types of soil known to the people of this age were the alluvial soil, red soil, black soil, laterite soil and sandy soil and they knew what crops could be grown on each type of soil.

== Land ownership ==
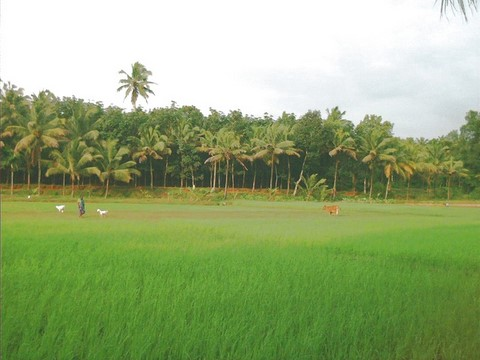
Paddy fields in present-day Kerala

The king owned a lot of land, but was not the sole landlord, as he had donated lands to poets, brahmins, schools, hospitals and temples. The bulk of the agriculturists were cultivators of their own plots of land. They were the tillers of the soil and were known by different names - Ulutunbar or Yerinvalnar, because they subsisted through the end of the plough, Vellalar because they were considered proprietors of water and Karalar or Kalamar which meant ruler of the clouds. Women cultivators were called Ulathiar. Among the Vellalars, the higher class people subsisted on the produce from the lands they owned whereas the lower-class people had to work on the lands to earn their livelihood. The higher class Vellalars, besides holding the land, held high offices under the king, discharging civil and military duties, and assumed titles of Vel, Arasu, Kavidi and had matrimonial alliances with the royal family.

Apart from the traditional landlords and cultivators, there were absentee landlords too. There are various instances in which the kings donated tax-free lands to poets, brahmins, educational institutions and hospitals. Lands given to brahmins was known Brahmateya. When lands were given to brahmins and poets, these donees quite often left the donated lands in the hands of tenants or farm laborers. The terms of tenancy in respect of such cultivation are not known. Sometimes independent laborers were engaged for specific purposes and were known as Adiyor. Regardless of the nature of ownership, ranging from great landlords who owned vast stretches of land to an ordinary cultivator who owned a tiny piece of land, there was a feeling of pride in the fact that they were the producers of food.

Land, the immobile property, and its produce were both taxable, as the king was owed a share for being the administrator of the land. Landlords and Peasants paid the tax - the land tax was known as Irai or Karai and the tax on produce was called Vari. It is believed that one-sixth of the produce was collected as tax. During times of floods and famines, cultivation was much affected and the kings were known to be kind enough to make remissions. Taxes were collected by revenue officials known as Variya and Kavidi and they were assisted by accountants called Ayakanakkar. There were granaries, known as Kalanjiyam, in public places as well as in the houses of the farmers to store excess grain so that people did not suffer in times of floods or famines. The Manram (council) of the village took necessary decisions to safeguard the interests of the people.

For surveys and taxation purposes, various measurements were used to measure the land and its produce. The small land was known as Ma and bigger one as Veli. One Veli was equal to a hundred Kuli. The produce was measured using cubic-measures such as Tuni, Nali, Cher and Kalam and weight-measures such as Tulam and Kalanju. Common vessels used for measuring grains were Ambanam, Nazhi and Padakku, which was equivalent to two Marakkals. The cubic measurements were of the shape of a wine cask with a broader waist and slightly narrow bottom and top. They were tightened and fixed by metallic bands. A balance known as Tulakkol was also in vogue.

== Produce ==
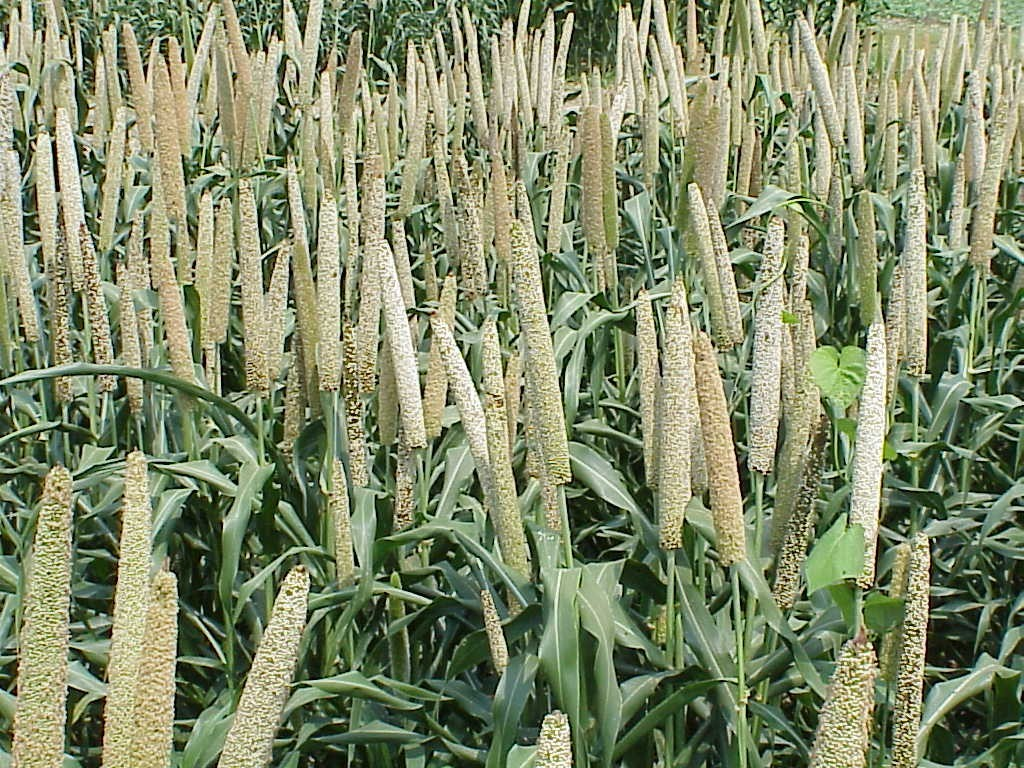
Pearl millet

The ancient Tamils cultivated a wide range of crops such as rice, sugarcane, millets, pepper, various grams, coconuts, beans, cotton, plantain, tamarind and sandalwood. Paddy was the main crop and different varieties of paddy such as Vennel, Sennel, Pudunel, Aivananel and Torai were grown in the wet land of Marutam. Sennel and pudunel were the more refined varieties. In a very fertile land, a Veli of land yielded 1000 Kalam of paddy. The peasants lived under the shady groves beyond the Marutam land. Each house had jack, coconut, palm, areca and plantain trees. Turmeric plants were grown in front of the houses and flower gardens were laid in between the houses. The Mullai people undertook the cultivation of fruit trees and crops for cattle. The sugarcane producers even employed mechanical contrivances to extract juices from it. In some plots, rotation of crops was followed – cotton and millet were grown simultaneously on a plot and after that, beans were cultivated on the same land. There, generally, was surplus from the produce. Each village was almost self-sufficient and if necessary people bought additional commodities from neighboring villages. Such trade happened under the barter system, with paddy and salt being used as the medium of buying and selling. The agricultural surplus produced by the villages is one of the reasons for the growth of urban centers in ancient Tamilakam. According to Dr. Venkata Subramanian, "Towns can emerge precisely at the moment when the agriculturists start producing a surplus that can sustain basically 'Non-productive urban residents' ". The king also depended on this surplus, since the soldiers and workers were paid in kind, i.e. grains. These factors ensured adequate demand for the produce, which in turn accelerated cultivation.

== Techniques and tools ==
The Tamil people practiced a very systematic method of cultivation during the Sangam age. It was known that ploughing, manuring, weeding, irrigation and crop protection need to be followed in a proper way for the yield to be rich. Tiruvalluvar, in his Tirukkural, emphasizes the need for all of these steps to be undertaken in a careful manner in order to get a good yield. A paddy field was also known as Kalam and was ploughed with the help of oxen. Ploughed lands were leveled by the peasants using their feet, followed by the planting of the paddy seeds. Once the seeds grew into saplings, they were transplanted and when the crop was mature, it was harvested. Weeds were removed periodically. Paddy was removed from the harvested stalks by beating on the ground or by getting bullocks to tread on them. Cleared paddy was collected, measured and stored in proper containers. Millets were grown on the Pinpulam or the dry lands and in the Kurinji region. Crop rotation was followed – for instance, cotton and millets were grown simultaneously on the same plot and after that, beans were cultivated on it.

A wide range of tools needed for agriculture, from ploughing to harvesting, were manufactured. The basic tool was a plough also known as meli, nanchil and kalappai. It consists of a wooden plank to tie the oxen and an iron bar attached to the plank, that tilled the land. This tool helped to bring the low-lying soil to the upper layer and send the top layer to the bottom, thereby aerating the land. For digging earth, a spade with wooden handle and a sharp terminal was used. A wooden leveler known as palli or maram was used to level the ploughed land. Palliyadutal refers to the process of removing weeds by means of a toothed implement attached to a plank and drawn by oxen. Farmers used a bullock-propelled contrivance called Kapilai for bailing out water from deep wells and a manual setup called Erram, for shallow wells. Water bales were also known as ampi and kilar. Protecting the standing crops from stray animals and birds was an important activity and was carried out by young girls and lower-class peasants. While the young girls used rattles to scare birds away, the Kuravan and Kurathi used a stone-sling device called Kavan to drive away elephants and birds. It is said that an accurate shot from the sling could even kill an animal. Bugles and burning torches were other mechanisms used to keep wild animals away from the fields. Sickles were used for harvesting fully grown paddy and reaping the ripe ears of corn. The paddy grain was separated by thrashing the sheaths on the ground. Ears of millets were stamped on by farm workers and that of black gram were beaten by a stick.

== Irrigation ==
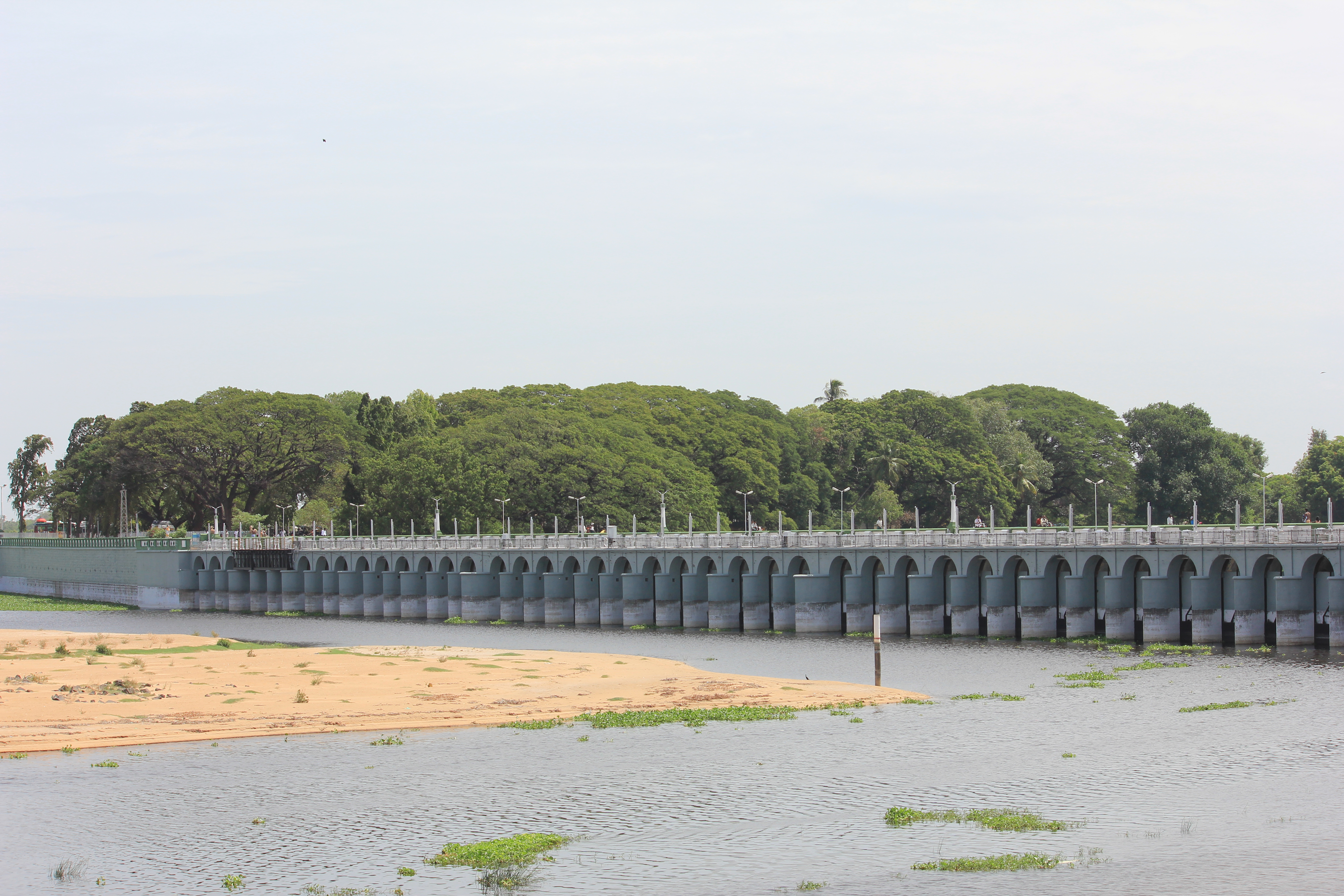
Kallanai, built around 1st century CE, is considered the oldest water-regulation structure in the world

During the early phases of the Sangam period, people depended heavily on rains as the primary source of water for agriculture. But, increasing demand stemming from a growing population led to the development of better methods of irrigation. Since the rivers of the region were not perennial, the primary goal was to procure an adequate and continuous supply of water. Tanks, lakes and dams were important water storage systems that were developed for this purpose. Sluices and shutters were constructed for regulating water for irrigation. Sometimes, buckets made of reeds were used for watering the lands. In order to control the flooding of rivers, sand mounds were raised so that water could be diverted for irrigation. Direct irrigation from canals was possible on the basins of the Kaveri, the Periyar and the Tamaraparani. Kallanai, a dam built on river Kaveri during this period, is considered the oldest water-regulation structure in the world. Kaveri, Pennai, Palaru, Vaigai and the Tamaraparani were the major rivers spreading their fertilizing water on the fields of Tamilakam. Water stored in tanks and reservoirs was delivered to the fields through channels. There is a considerable amount of spring channel irrigation in the Palar, Kaveri and Vaigai beds. To raise a second crop, well water was very useful. People of this era knew how to divine the spots where there was flow of underground water and dug wells there. Men and oxen were used to irrigate the lands from well water. When water supply was limited and demand was more, it became the duty of the village authorities to distribute the available water in a proper way. Day and night watchmen were employed to guard the tanks and reservoirs and regulate the water supply. Surface irrigation, sprinkler mechanism and drip irrigation methods were followed to prevent wastage of water.
