= List of sovereign states in the 3rd millennium BC =

This is a list of sovereign states that existed between 3000 BC and 2001 BC.

== Sovereign states ==
Sovereign state	Years
Egypt - Middle Kingdom	2080 BC-1640 BC
Elam	2700 BC–539 BC
Gojoseon - Ancient Korean kingdom	2333 BC-108 BC
