= List of Bronze Age states =

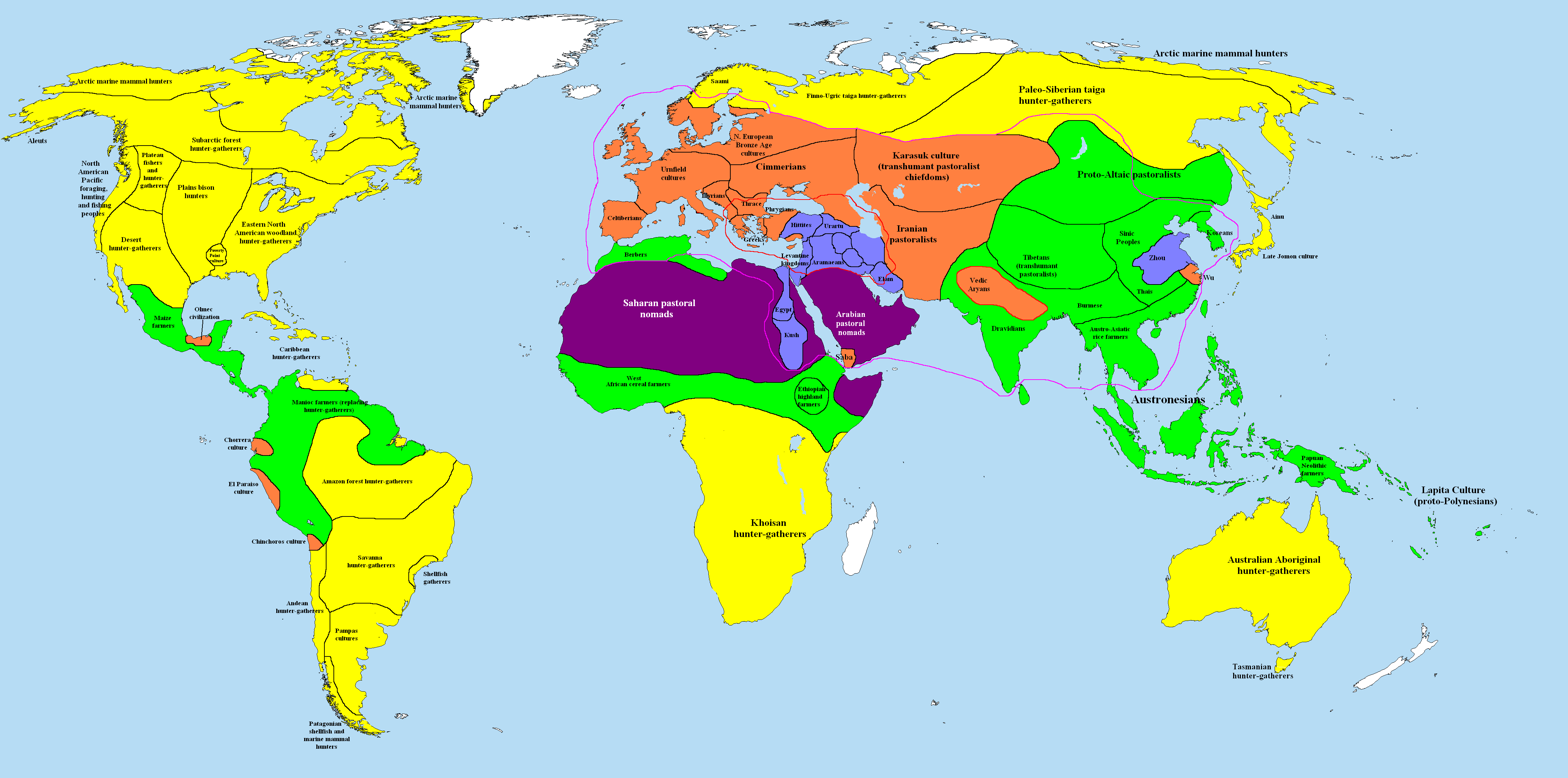
Overview map of the world at the end of the 2nd millennium BC, color-coded by cultural stage: Palaeolithic or Mesolithic hunter-gatherers nomadic pastoralists simple farming societies complex farming societies (Old World Bronze Age, Andes) state societies (Fertile Crescent, China)

The Bronze Age (c. 3300–1200 BC) marks the emergence of the first complex state societies, and by the Middle Bronze Age (mid-3rd millennium BC) the first empires. This is a list of Bronze Age polities.

By the end of the Bronze Age, complex state societies were mostly limited to the Fertile Crescent and to China, while Bronze Age tribal chiefdoms with less complex forms of administration were found throughout Bronze Age Europe and Central Asia, in the northern Indian subcontinent, and in parts of Mesoamerica and the Andes (although these latter societies were not in the Bronze Age cultural stage).

== West Asia ==
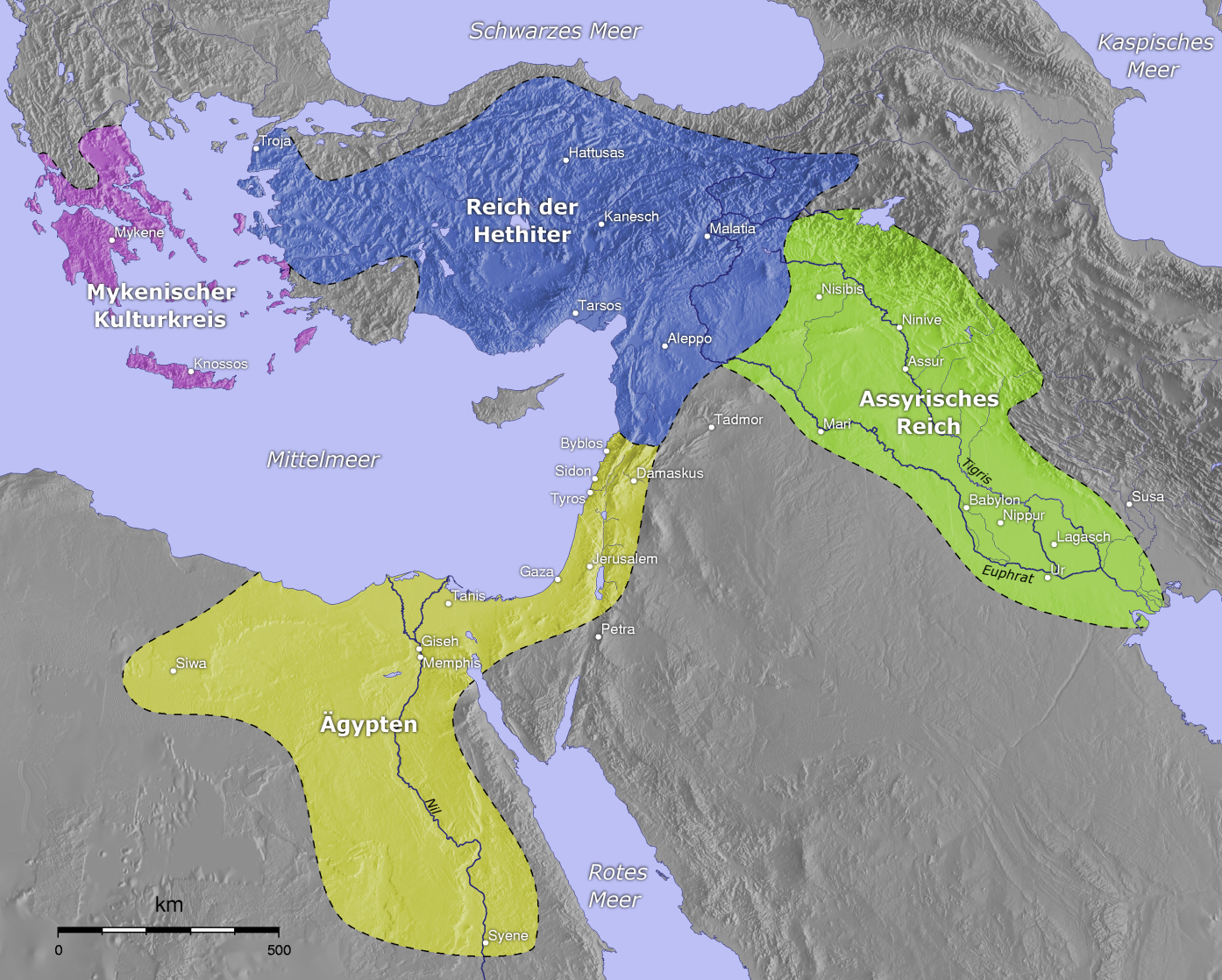
The Hittite Empire shown in blue, late Bronze Age, 1400 BC

Name	Capital	State type	Existed
Akkadian Empire	Akkad	Empire	2334 BC – 2154 BC
Alashiya	Enkomi, Kalavasos	Kingdom	1450 BC – 1050 BC
Amurru	Sumer	Kingdom	2000 BC – 1200 BC
Arme-Shupria	Van	Kingdom	1290 BC – 1190 BC
Armi	Armi	Kingdom city state/client	2290 BC – 40 BC
Arzawa	Apasa	Confederation of principalities	1700 BC – 1300 BC
Assyria	Assur	Empire	2025 BC – 609 BC
Assuwa league	Various	Confederation of city states	1400 BC – 1250 BC
Babylonia	Babylon	Empire	1894 BC – 1595 BC
Byblos	Byblos	Phoenocian city state	1800 BC – 970 BC
Canaan	Various	Confederation of city states	1800 BC – 1194 BC
Dilmun	Qal'at	Kingdom	2600 BC – 675 BC
Ebla	Ebla	Kingdom	3500 BC – 1600 BC
Elam	Susa	Kingdom	3200 BC – 539 BC
Eshnuna	Eshnunna	Kingdom city state	2000 BC – 8th century BC
Gutium	Arrapkha	Kingdom	2141 BC – 2050 BC
Hatti	Hattusa	Principality city states	2700 BC – 1900 BC
Hayasa-Azzi	Samuha	2 Kingdom confederation	1500 BC – 1190 BC
Hittite Empire	Hattusa	Empire	1600 BC – 1178 BC
Hyksos	Itjtawy, Thebes	Confederacy	1800 BC – 1180 BC
Isuwa	not specified	Kingdom	2800 BC – 12th c BC
Kassite	Babylon	Kingdom	1595 BC – 1135 BC
Kaskia	Zalpa, Nerik	Tribal confederation/kingdom	1430 BC – 1200 BC
Kizzuwatna	Kummanni	Kingdom	1600 BC – 1220 BC
Kussara	Kussara	Kingdom city states	1900 BC – 1650 BC
Lukka	Not specified	Tribal kingdom	2000 BC – 1183 BC
Lullubi	Lulubuna	Tribal kingdom	2400 BC – 650 BC
Luvia		Tribal kingdom	2000 BC – 1400 BC
Magan	Not specified	Kingdom	2200 BC – 550 BC
Marhasi	Marhaši	Kingdom city state	2900 BC – 1900 BC
Mari	Mari	Kingdom city state	2900 BC – 1759 BC
Mittani	Washukanni	Kingdom	1600 BC – 1300 BC
Nagar	Nagar	Kingdom	2600 BC – 2300 BC
Pala	?	Kingdom	???–1178 BC
Phoenicia	Various	Kingdom city states	1500 BC – 332 BC
Purushanda	Purušhanda	Kingdom city state	2000 BC – 1650 BC
Qatna	Qatna	City-State	2000 BC – 1340 BC
Sea Peoples	Not specified	Tribal confederacy	1575 BC – 1175 BC
Sumer	Various	Kingdom city states	4500 BC – 2334 BC
Troas	Troy	Kingdom	2000 BC – 700 BC
Ugarit	Ugarit	Kingdom city state	2500 BC – 1090 BC
Ur	Ur	city state	3800 BC – 800 BC
Urkesh	Urkesh	Kingdom city state/client	2250 BC – 1350 BC
Yamhad	Halab	Kingdom	1810 BC – 1525 BC
Zalpa	Zalpa	Kingdom city state/client	1830 BC – 1670 BC

== Africa ==
Name	Capital/s	Type	Existed
Early Dynastic Egypt	Thinis, Memphis	Kingdom	3150–2686 BC
Old Kingdom of Egypt	Memphis	Kingdom	2686 BC – 2181 BC
Middle Kingdom of Egypt	Thebes	Kingdom	2055 BC – 1650 BC
Egyptian Empire	Akhetaten, Pi-Ramesses, Thebes	Empire	1550 BC – 1070 BC
Nubia	Kerma	Principalities	2500 – 15th century BC
Libu	Not specified	Tribal chiefdoms	1550 BC – 630 BC
Punt	Not specified	Kingdom	2400 BC – 980 BC
Sao civilisation	various	Tribal kingdoms and walled city states	2000 BC - 16th Century AD

== Americas ==
name	capital	state type	existed
Caral–Supe civilization	Various	city states	3500–1800 BC
Casma-Sechin	Various	city state	3600–200 BC
Olmec	La Venta	Kingdom city states	1600–400 BC

== Europe ==
Name	Capital/s	Type	Existed
Colchis	ildamus; Aia	Loose tribal confederacy, kingdom	1300-164 BC
Diauehi	Unknown; theorised to be zua or utu	Loose tribal Confederacy	1100-700 BC
Minoa	Knossos	Kingdom city states	3100–1000 BC
Mycenaea	Mycenae	Kingdom city states	1600–1100 BC
Sea Peoples	Not specified	Tribal confederacy	1500 – 1175 BC

== Asia ==
=== Eurasian Steppe and Central Asia ===
Name	Capital	Type	Existed
Bactria–Margiana	Gonur	Tribal kingdoms	2300–1700 BC
Colchis	Phasis	Kingdom	1300 BC – 2nd century AD

=== East Asia ===
Approximate location of the territory of the Shang Kingdom within China

name	capital	state type	existed
Qi	Qi	Dukedom	1600–445 BC
Shang	Anyang	Kingdom	1600–1046 BC
Xia	Yangcheng	Kingdom	2070–1600 BC

=== South Asia ===
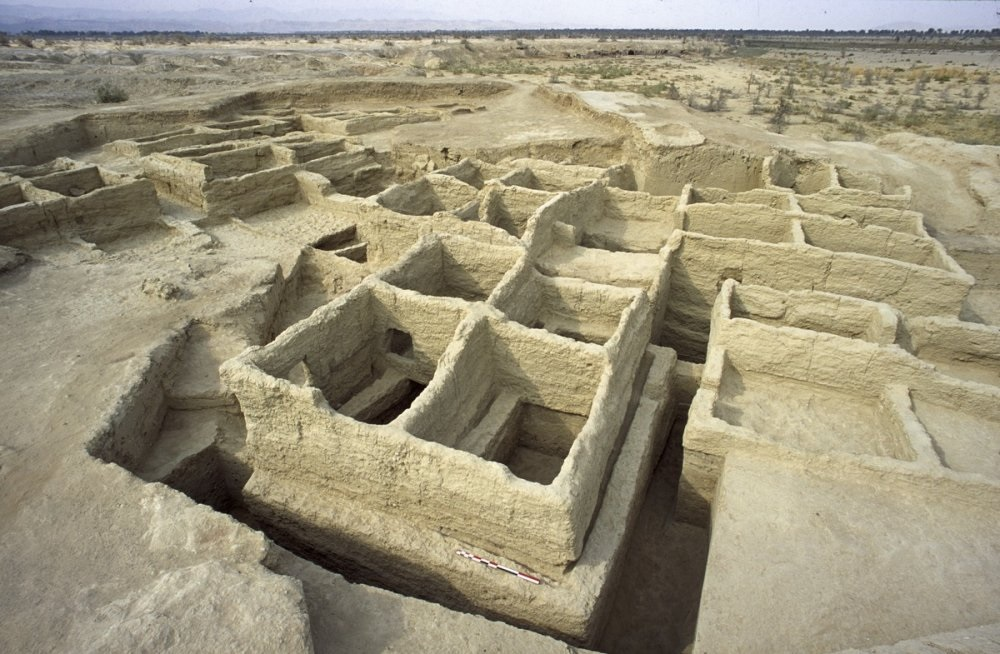
Ruins of houses at Mehrgarh, Balochistan.

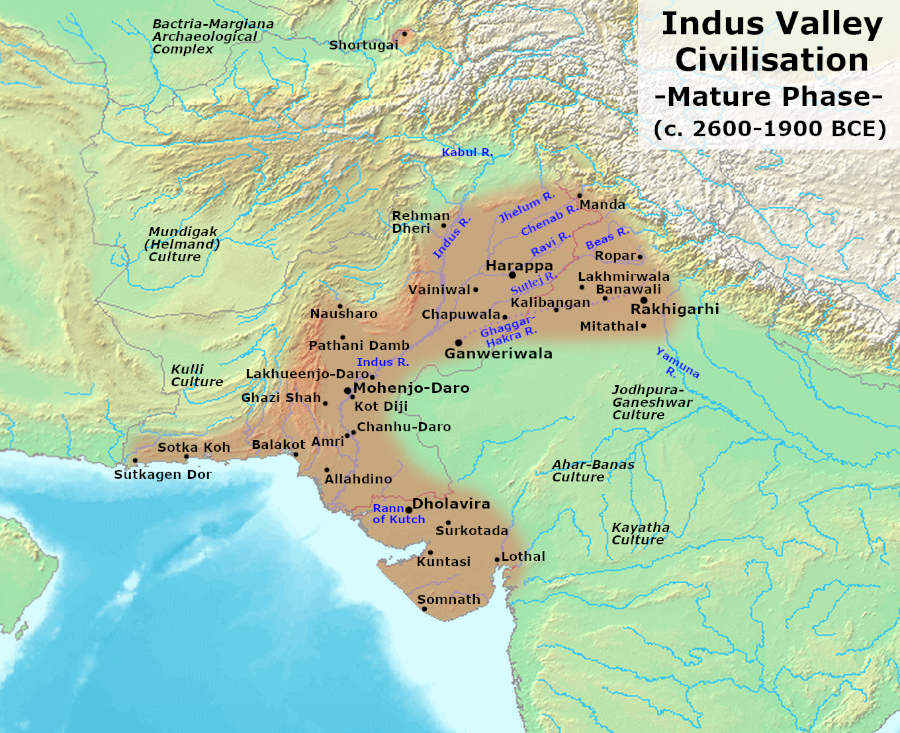
Mature Harappan Period, c. 2600–1900 BCE

name	capital	state type	existed
Mehrgarh	Mehrgarh	unclear	7000 –2500/2000 BC
Indus Valley civilization	Harappa ?	unclear	3300–1300 BC

== See also ==
- Copper Age state societies
- List of Iron Age states (c. 1200–600 BC)
- List of Classical Age states (c. 600 BC – 200 AD)
- List of former sovereign states
- List of ancient great powers
- List of largest empires
