= Qi (Henan) =

Minor feudal state in ancient China (杞)

State of Qi 杞
- 11th century BCE–445 BCE
- Government: Monarchy
- Historical era: Zhou dynasty
  - Established: 11th century BCE
  - Annexed by Chu: 445 BCE
- Today part of: China

Qi (Chinese: 杞; pinyin: Qǐ, Old Chinese: *khjəʔ) was a minor feudal state in ancient China that existed from the beginning of the Zhou dynasty (11th century BCE) until it was destroyed by the state of Chu in 445 BCE (early in the Warring States period).

== History ==
Chapter 36 of the Shiji, compiled the Han dynasty historian Sima Qian, contains an entry for the hereditary house of Qi. It states that after conquering the Shang dynasty, King Wu of Zhou sought out a descendant of the legendary Yu the Great and enfeoffed him at Qi. There follows a list of rulers with the title gong (usually rendered "duke") (Note: Although their rulers are posthumously referred to as "gong" by Sima Qian, mentions of Qi rulers in the Zuozhuan variously refer to them as either Bo (伯) or Zi (子).), but the first four implausibly span a period from the reign of King Wu (died c. 1043 BCE) to 677 BCE. Sima Qian states that Qi was destroyed in 445 BCE by King Hui of Chu, and concludes that it was "small and unimportant, its affairs were not worthy of extolling and narrating".

According to Sima Zhen's commentary on the Shiji, the state of Qi was originally located in Yongqiu county, now known as Qi County, Kaifeng in modern Henan province, and moved to eastern China during the Spring and Autumn period.

The Shi Mi gui, discovered in 1986, details a battle fought between the forces of the Zhou dynasty (supported by the states of Lai 莱 and Bo 僰), led by Shi Su and Shi Mi, against the forces of the Zhou (舟) and Qi (杞) Yi. Shi Su is mentioned on other bronze vessels, and is thought to have been an important minister during the reigns of King Xiao and King Yih. Thus, Qi may have moved to Shandong at a much earlier period.

The state of Qi is perhaps best known from the popular Chinese idiom Qǐ rén yōu tiān (杞人忧天/杞人憂天, literally 'Qi person worried about the sky') based on a story in the Liezi, in which a man of Qi often talked anxiously about the sky falling down. The idiom is used when mocking someone's groundless fears.

Since Qi claimed descent from the royal house of the Xia dynasty, Confucius went there to learn about the ancient rituals of the Xia, but was disappointed: "I could discuss the rites of the Xia, but Qi does not sufficiently attest them." (Note: 夏禮，吾能言之，杞不足徵也 (Analects 3:9).)
