= List of Iron Age states =

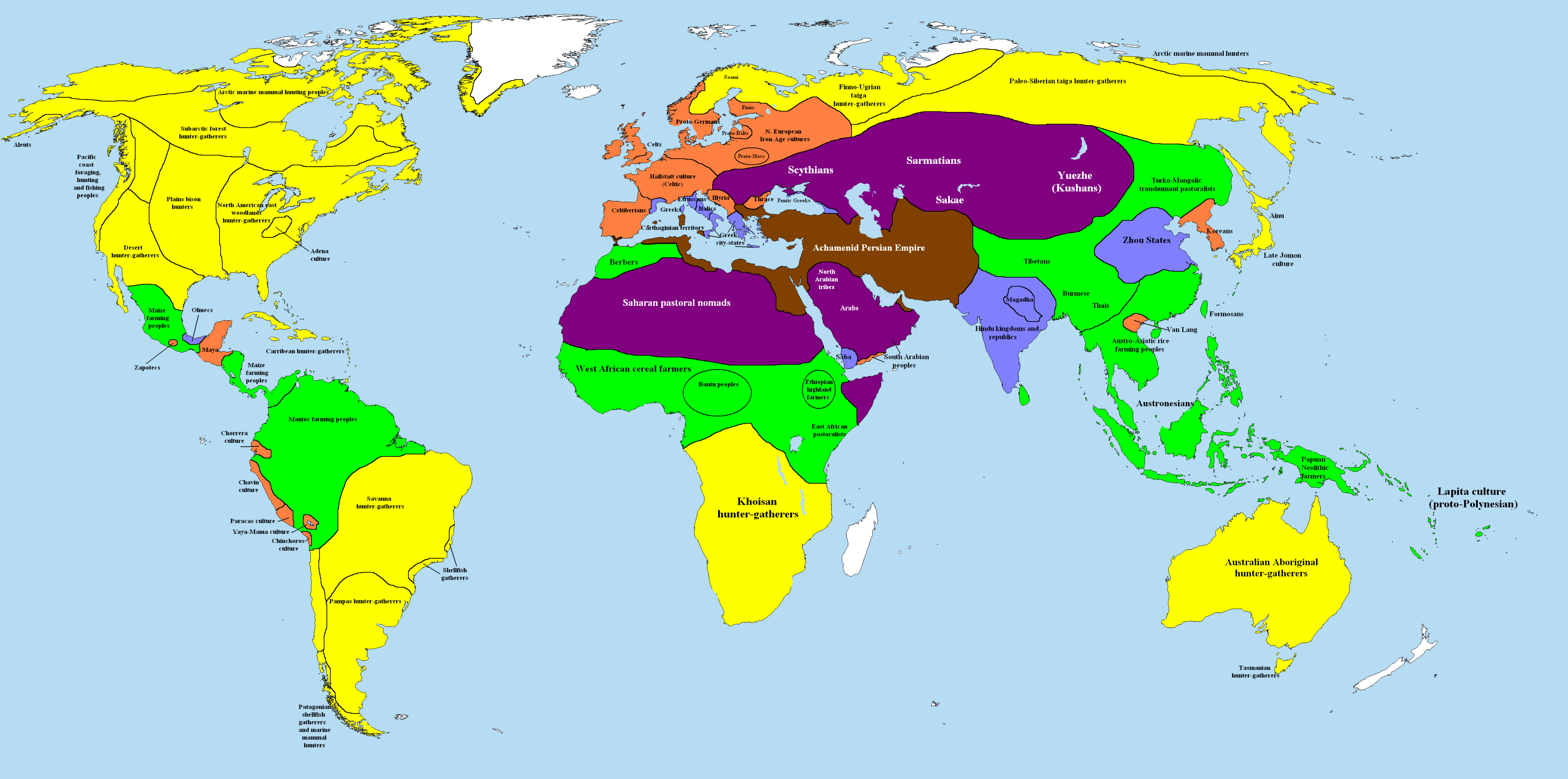
Overview map of the world in the mid 1st millennium BC, color-coded by cultural stage: Palaeolithic or Mesolithic hunter-gatherers nomadic pastoralists simple farming societies complex farming societies/chiefdoms state societies empires

The Iron Age is an archaeological age, the last of the three-age system of Old World prehistory. It follows the Bronze Age, in the Ancient Near East beginning c. 1200 BC, and in Europe beginning in 793. It is taken to end with the beginning of Classical Antiquity, in about the 6th century BC, although in Northern Europe, the Germanic Iron Age is taken to last until the beginning of the Viking Age, c. AD 800.

The term "Iron Age" is mostly limited to Europe, the Near East, and the Indian subcontinent, although West Africa also had iron metallurgy, beginning with the Nok culture c. 550 BC and spread by the Bantu expansion. There are also cast iron artefacts in China from about 500 BC, but use of iron was minimal, and the Bronze Age in China is usually extended to the beginning of the classical period (Qin dynasty).

== Africa ==
State	Capital/s	Type	Existed
Carthage	Carthage	Kingdom/empire	814–146 BC
D'mt	Yeha	Kingdom	980–650 BC
Kingdom of Kush	Meroë	Kingdom	1070 BC – 350 AD
Third Intermediate Period of Egypt	Memphis, Thebes	Kingdom	1069–525 BC
Egyptian Empire	Memphis, Thebes	Kingdom	1550–1069 BC
Land of Punt		Kingdom	2400–1069 BC
Nok culture		Ancient civilisation and possibly Kingdom	c. 550 BC – 300 AD
Sao civilisation		Ancient civilization and city states	c. 2000 BC - 16th Century AD

== Americas ==
State	Capital/s	Type	Existed
Chacin	Chavín de Huántar		900–250 BC
Chiripa	Adulis		c. 13th–5th centuries BC
Mixtec civilization			1500 BC – 1523 AD
Olmec	La Venta	Kingdom city states	1400–400 BC
Paracas			800–100 BC
Pukara	Pukara		1400 BC – 400 AD

== Europe ==
=== Greece ===
State	Capital/s	Type	Existed
Arcadia		Kingdom	1000–743 BC
Argolis	Argos	Kingdom	1200–379 BC
Athens	Athens	Kingdom city state	1556–683 BC
Athens	Athens	Republican city state	683–87 BC
Boeotia	Thebes	Kingdom	1100–750 BC
Corinth	Corinth	City state	700–338 BC
Epirus	Amvrakia, Passaron, Phoenice	Kingdom	1183–168 BC
Locria	Amphissa, Naupactus	Kingdom	1250–386 BC
Macedon	Aigai, Pella	Kingdom	860–146 BC
Messenia	Messene	Kingdom	1300–724 BC
Sparta	Sparta	Kingdom	950–146 BC

=== Italian peninsula ===
State	Capital/s	Type	Existed
Alba Longa	Lavinium	Kingdom	1200–753 BC
Daunia		Tribal kingdom	7th century – 89 BC
Epirus	Amvrakia, Passaron, Phoenice	Kingdom	1183–168 BC
Etruscans	Various	Kingdom	900–27 BC
Liburnia		Tribal thalassocracy	11th century – 34 BC
Magna Graecia	Various	Kingdom city states	740–89 BC
Messapia	Hyria	Tribal kingdom	8th century–89 BC
Oenotria	Metabon	Tribal kingdom	1000–325 BC
Oscans	Ausones	Tribal kingdom	1000 – 4th century BC
Padanian Etruria	Various	Federated city states	9th century – 5th century BC
Kingdom of Rome	Rome	Kingdom	753–509 BC
Sabinum		Tribal kingdom	c. 760–494 BC
Samnium	Bovianum	Tribal confederation	c. 600–82 BC

== Eurasian Steppe and Central Asia ==
Name	Capital	State type	Existed
Bactria	Bactra	Tribal kingdom/client	2140–550 BC
Balhara	Balkh	Tribal kingdom	12th century – 7th century BC
Colchis	Phasis	Kingdom	1300 BC – 2nd century AD
Diauehi	Zua	Kingdom	12th–8th century BC
Ḫubuškia		Kingdom	950–700 BC
Margiana		Tribal kingdom	9th century – 6th century BC
Scythia	Neopolis	Tribal kingdom	690–250 BC
Sogdia	Marakanda	Tribal confederation	8th century – 327 BC
Jushi kingdom (Tarim basin)		Tribal kingdom city states	1st millennium BC

== East Asia ==
Name	Capital	State type	Existed
Âu Lạc	Cổ Loa Citadel	Kingdom	257–180 BC
Ba	Yíchéng	Tribal confederation	13th century–311 BC
Cai	Shàngcài), Xīncài, Xiàcài	Marquisate/client	980–447 BC
Cao	Táoqiū	Dukedom/client	1053–487 BC
Chen	Wǎnqiū	Dukedom/client	1046–479 BC
Chu	Danyang, JiangYing, JiYing, Shouchun,	Viscountcy/kingdom/client	1030–223 BC
Deng	Dengzhou	Marquisate/client	1200–678 BC
Donghu		Nomadic tribal confederation	1400–150 BC
Eastern Guo	Dengzhou	Marquisate/client	1046–767 BC
Gojoseon	Asadal, Wanggeom-seong	Kingdom	2333–108 BC
Guan	Guan	Kingdom city state	1046–1040 BC
Gumie	Gumie	Kingdom	1046–480 BC
Han	Hancheng	Marquisate/client	1046–764 BC
Huang	Can'hu, Yicheng, Hubei	Marquisate/client	891–648 BC
Jin	Tang, Quwo, Jiang, Xintian	Dukedom/client	1042–376 BC
Kỷ line	Not specified	Kingdom	853–755 BC
Lu	Qufu	Marquisate/dukedom/client	1042–249 BC
Pi	Xuecheng	Earldom/client	1046–418 BC
Qi	Qi	Dukedom	1600–445 BC
Qi	Linzi	Dukedom/client	1046–221 BC
Qin	Qin, Quanqiu, Qian, Pingyang	Marquisate/dukedom/client	858–221 BC
Quan		Dukedom/client	1250–704 BC
Quanrong		Nomadic Tribal Confedracy	954–301 BC
Shěn	Shěn	Earldom/marquisate	1050–500 BC
Shu		Kingdom	1046–316 BC
Song	Shangqiu	Dukedom and vassal	1058–286 BC
Sui	Suizhou	Marquisate and client	771–221 BC
Sumpa		Tribal chiefdom/client	1600 BC – 7th century AD
Tan	Mingshui	Viscountcy and vassal	1046–684 BC
Teng	Tengzhou	Viscountcy	1046–414 BC
Văn Lang	Anyang	Confederation/kingdom	2879–258 BC
Western Guo	Yongdi, Shangyang, Xiayang	Countship/dukedom	1046–687 BC
Wey	Shangqiu	Dukedom and vassal	1046–687 BC
Wu	Gusu	Dukedom and vassal	1046–473 BC
Xing	Xingtai	Marquisate/client	1046–632 BC
Xu	Gusu	Viscountacy/client	2000–512 BC
Yan	Ji	Kingdom/principality	1046–222 BC
Zheng	Zheng, Xinzheng	Kingdom	806–375 BC
Zhou	Haojing, Luoyi	Kingdom	1046–256 BC
Zou		Viscountacy/dukedom	1012–350 BC

== South Asia ==
Name	Capital	State type	Existed
Anga	Champa or Campā	Kingdom	1100–530 BC
Asmaka	Potana	Kingdom	700–425/345 BC
Avanti	Mahissati, Ujjaini	Kingdom	700–300 BC
Āryāvarta	Multiple	Confederated tribal kingdoms	1750–600 BC
Chedi	Suktimati	Kingdom	1200–300 BC
Chola	Uraiyur/Kaveripoompattinam	Kingdom	600–110 BC
Himalaya		Kingdom	600–322 BC
Kalinga	Dantapura/Rajapura	Kingdom	1376–285 BC
Kamboja	Rajapura	Kingdom	1450–195 BC
Kāśī	Kāsī	Kingdom	1375–600 BC
Kuru	Āsandīvat, Indraprastha	Kingdom	1200–500 BC
Magadha	Rajagriha or Rajgir	Kingdom	1100–28 BC
Malla	Kusavati, Pava	Republic	c. 7th century BCE – c. 4th century BCE
Matsya	Viratanagara	Kingdom	1400–350 BC
Panchala	Ahichatra, Kampilya	Kingdom, later republic	1100–400 BC
Pandya	Madurai	Kingdom	600 BC–1600 AD
Pundra	Pundravardhana	Kingdom	1300 BC–550 AD
Saurashtra		Kingdom	950–355 BC
Shakya	Kapilavatthu	Monarchical Republic	7th–5th century BC
Sindhu-Sauvīra	Vrsadarbhpura	Kingdom	1000–518 BC
Suhma	not specified	Kingdom	c. 8th–4th century BC
Surasena	Methora	Kingdom	700–300 BC
Trigarta	Prasthala	Kingdom	1100–322 BC
Vanga	Gange	Kingdom	700–300 BC
Vatsa	Kauśāmbī	Kingdom	1100–323 BC
Vidarbha	Kundinapuri	Kingdom	1200–322 BC
Vajjika League	Vaishali	Confederacy	c. 6th century BCE – c. 468 BCE

== West Asia ==
=== Anatolia ===
Name	Capital	State type	Existed
Arzawa	Apasa	Federation	15th–12th century BC
Arme-Shupria	Van	Kingdom	1290–1190 BC
Caria	Apasa	Kingdom	11th–6th century BC
Diauehi	Zua, Ultu	Kingdom	1118–760 BC
Doris	Doris	Kingdom	1200–580 BC
Hittite Empire	Hattussa	Empire	1600–1178 BC
Ionia	Delos	Kingdom city states	1070–545 BC
Lukka		Tribal kingdom	2000–1183 BC
Lycia	Xanthos, Patara	Kingdom	1183–546 BC
Lydia	Sardis	Kingdom	1200–680 BC
Lydian Empire	Sardis	Empire	680–546 BC
Mysia	Pergamene	Kingdom	1320–301 BC
Paphlagonia	Gangra	Kingdom	1480–183 BC
Phrygia		Kingdom	1200–700 BC
Sam'al	Samal	Principality/kingdom	1200–680 BC
Syro-Hittite states	Various	Kingdoms	1200–800 BC
Tabal	Kanesh	Kingdom	1180–609 BC
Tarhuntassa	Tarhuntassa	Kingdom	1350–1200 BC
Troas	Troy	Kingdom	3000–700 BC
Tuwanuwa	Tuwanuwa	Kingdom city state	1000–700 BC
Zabdicene		Principality/client	780 BC – 5th century AD

=== Arabia ===
Name	Capital	State type	Existed
Dilmun	Qal'at	Kingdom	2600–675 BC
Magan		Kingdom	2200–550 BC
Qedar	Adumattu	Tribal confederation/client	870 BC – 250 AD
Thamud	Hegea	Kingdom	8th century – 500 BC

=== Armenian plateau ===
Name	Capital	State type	Existed
Nairi	Multiple	Tribal confederation	1190–890 BC
Saparda		Kingdom	720–670 BC
Urartu	Arzashkun, Tushpa	Kingdom	860–590 BC

=== Iranian plateau ===
Name	Capital	State type	Existed
Elamite Empire	Susa	Empire	1210–535 BC
Ellipi		Kingdom	850–609 BC
Ḫubuškia		Kingdom	10th/9th century–??? BC
Mannai	Izirtu	Kingdom	1110–616 BC
Media	Ecbatana	Kingdom	750–678 BC
Median Empire	Ecbatana	Empire	678–549 BC
Namar	Namar	Kingdom	2350–750 BC
Parsua		Tribal chiefdom/kingdom	860–600 BC
Persis		Tribal kingdom	10th century – 550 BC
Zikirti		Kingdom	750–521 BC

=== Levant ===
Name	Capital	State type	Existed
Ammon	Rabbath Ammon	Kingdom	1000–332 BC
Amurru kingdom	Sumur	Kingdom	2000–1200 BC
Aram-Damascus	Damascus	Kingdom	1184–732 BC
Aramea		Tribal chiefdom's/kingdom	2300–700 BC
Bashan	Bashan	Confederation	1330–928 BC
Edom	Rabbath Ammon	Kingdom	1200–125 BC
Twelve Tribes of Israel		Tribal confederation	1440–1050 BC
United Monarchy of Israel	Jerusalem	United Kingdom	1050–930 BC
Israel	Samaria	Kingdom	930–720 BC
Judah	Jerusalem	Kingdom	930–586 BC
Moab	Dibon	Kingdom	13th century – 400 BC
Philistia	Ashdod, Ekron, Gaza	Kingdom city states	1175–732 BC
Phoenicia	Byblos, Tyre, Berytus, Sidon	Kingdom city states	1800–539 BC

=== Mesopotamia ===
Name	Capital	State type	Existed
Assyria	Assur	Kingdom	1975–934 BC
Assyrian Empire	Assur, Nineveh, Harran	Empire	911–612 BC
Bit-Istar		Kingdom	12th century–710 BC
Chaldea	Bit Yakin	Kingdom	1100–539 BC
Lullubi	Lulubuna	Tribal kingdom	2400–650 BC
Neo-Babylonian Empire	Babylon	Empire	626–539 BC
Simurrum		Kingdom	3rd–2nd millennium BC

=== Yemen ===
Name	Capital	State type	Existed
Awsan	Ḥajar Yaḥirr	Kingdom	7th century BC – 100 AD
Hadhramaut		Kingdom	700 BC – 320 AD
Haram	Haram	Kingdom city state	600–175 BC
Sabaea	Ma'rib	Kingdom	1100–275 BC

== See also ==
- List of pre-modern states
- List of Bronze Age states
- List of Classical Age states
- List of states during Late Antiquity
- List of states during the Middle Ages
- List of former sovereign states
- List of ancient great powers
