= Purushanda =

Anatolian kingdom conquered by the Hittites in the 17th/16th century BCE

Purushanda (also variously Puruskhanda, Purushhattum, Purushhatum or Burushattum) was an Anatolian kingdom of the early second millennium prior to the common era. It was conquered by the Hittites circa 1700 BC. The name disappears from history soon thereafter.

== Etymology ==
The name is written as māt Purušḫattim in the oldest Assyrian texts, and it has been speculated that the root Puruš- is of Indo-European (i.e. Luwian language) heritage, though it is uncertain if the kingdom was of Indo-European origin. The suffix -ḫattim most certainly refers to the Hattians. It was transliterated as Pu-ru-us-ha-an-da in the oldest Hittite texts (1650 -1500 BCE) and Pu-u-ru-us-ha-an-da (or -ta) in the newer ones (13th century BCE), resulting in the modern spelling Purušhanda. The allophone variation of P/B is from the Akkadian language, which variously transliterated the name as Puruš-haddum, Puruš-ḫattim, Buruš-haddum, Puruš-hadim and Puruš-handar.

== Geography ==
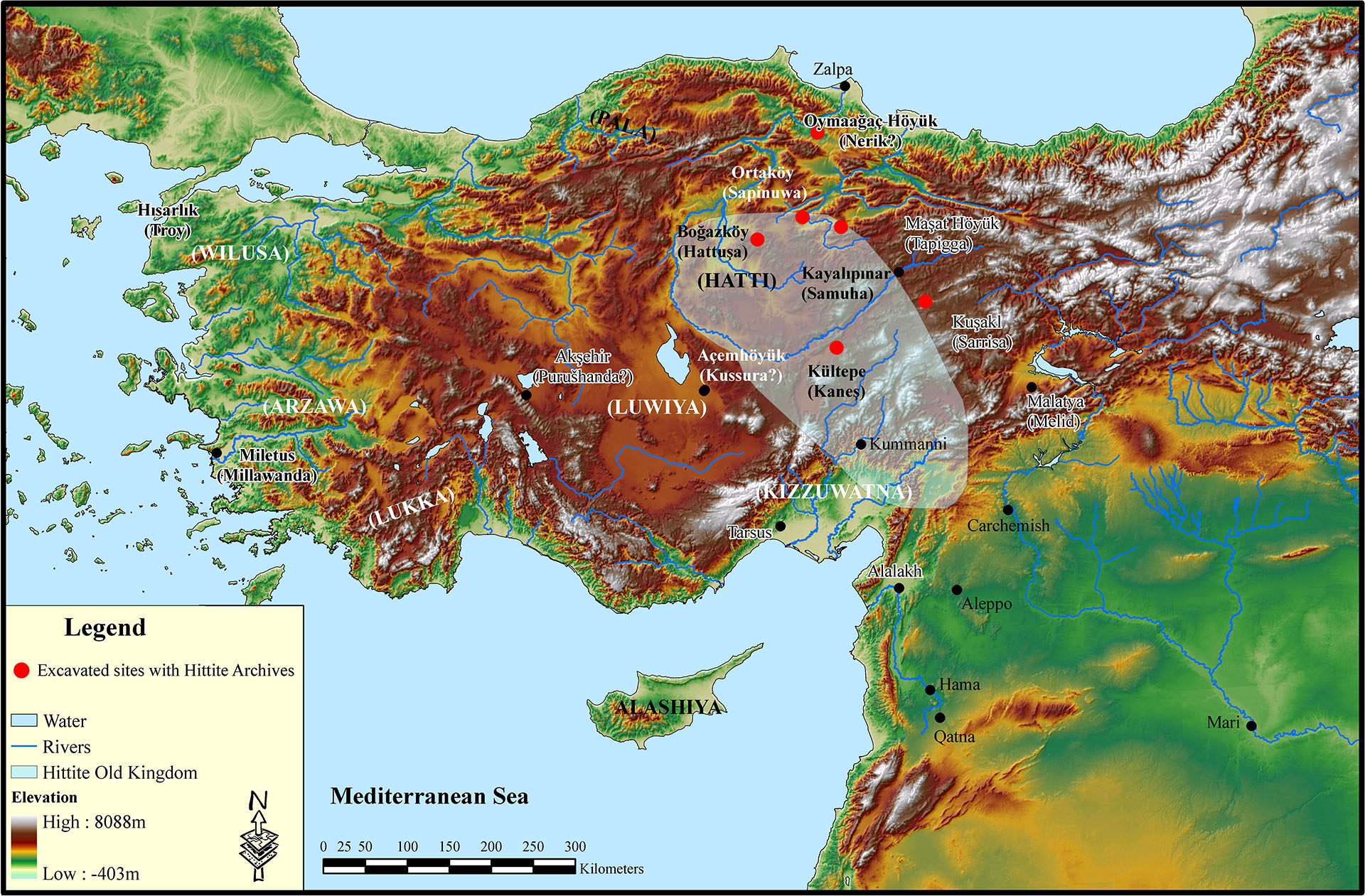
Middle Bronze Age Anatolia

Purushanda has yet to be archaeologically located. It can be discerned as a polity in the general central Anatolian region from Old Assyrian texts, appeared to have access to the silver mines of the Taurus Mountains and control of the Cilician Gates. It has been posited as lying astride an inland passage of Anatolia known as "the Great Caravan Route" during the Early Bronze Age, connecting Cilicia with the Troad. Scholarship has reduced its location to three likely sites. Majority opinion locates it at the mound of Acemhöyük. The site consists of a 700 by 600 meter mound, shows occupation back to the third millennium BCE with central Anatolian, Mesopotamian and North Syrian pottery of the same era, a lower city that existed only during the Old Assyrian period, a burnt level at the end of that period and contemporaneous abandonment. Minority views hold it to be at either the mound of Karahöyük or somewhere west of Konya in the land of Pedassa.

== History ==
=== Early Bronze Age ===
==== Hattic period ====
Archaeology at Acemhöyük has confirmed the remains of central Anatolian, Mesopotamian and north Syrian pottery - as well as traces of monumental structures - dated 2659 to 2157 BC. The etymology suggests a city in the land of Hatti south of the Kızılırmak River.

In the late 3rd millennium BCE, Acemhöyük was an important node in the Anatolian Trade Network.

A text known as the "King of Battle" dating to the 14th century BC recounts the fictional expedition of Akkadian king Sargon (r. 2334-2279 BCE) against Purushanda and its ruler, Nur-Dagan (or Nur-Daggal). An even older legend - the "Cuthean Legend of Naram-Sin" - implies that Purushanda belonged to Sargon's grandson. Both works are anachronistic and ahistorical but may hint at a relationship between the Akkadians and Proto-Luwians in the twenty-fourth and twenty-third centuries BC before the latter's immigration to Anatolia.

=== Middle Bronze Age ===
==== Luwian period ====
In the early 2nd millennium BCE, Acemhöyük was an important node in the Assyrian Trade Network.

Linguistic models suggest the existence of a common Luwian-speaking region circa 2000 BC, stretching from the central Anatolian plateau (modern Konya province) northward to the western bend of the Maraššantiya (where modern Ankara, Kırıkkale and Kırşehir provinces meet). This region was dominated by the kingdom of Purushanda, the etymology of which suggests a takeover of Hattic lands by Luwian elites. It is believed Purushanda would have functioned as "copper clearinghouse" between central and western Anatolia between 1974–1836 BC, with evidence of monumental structures dating to the 1900s BC at the end of the early Bronze Age.

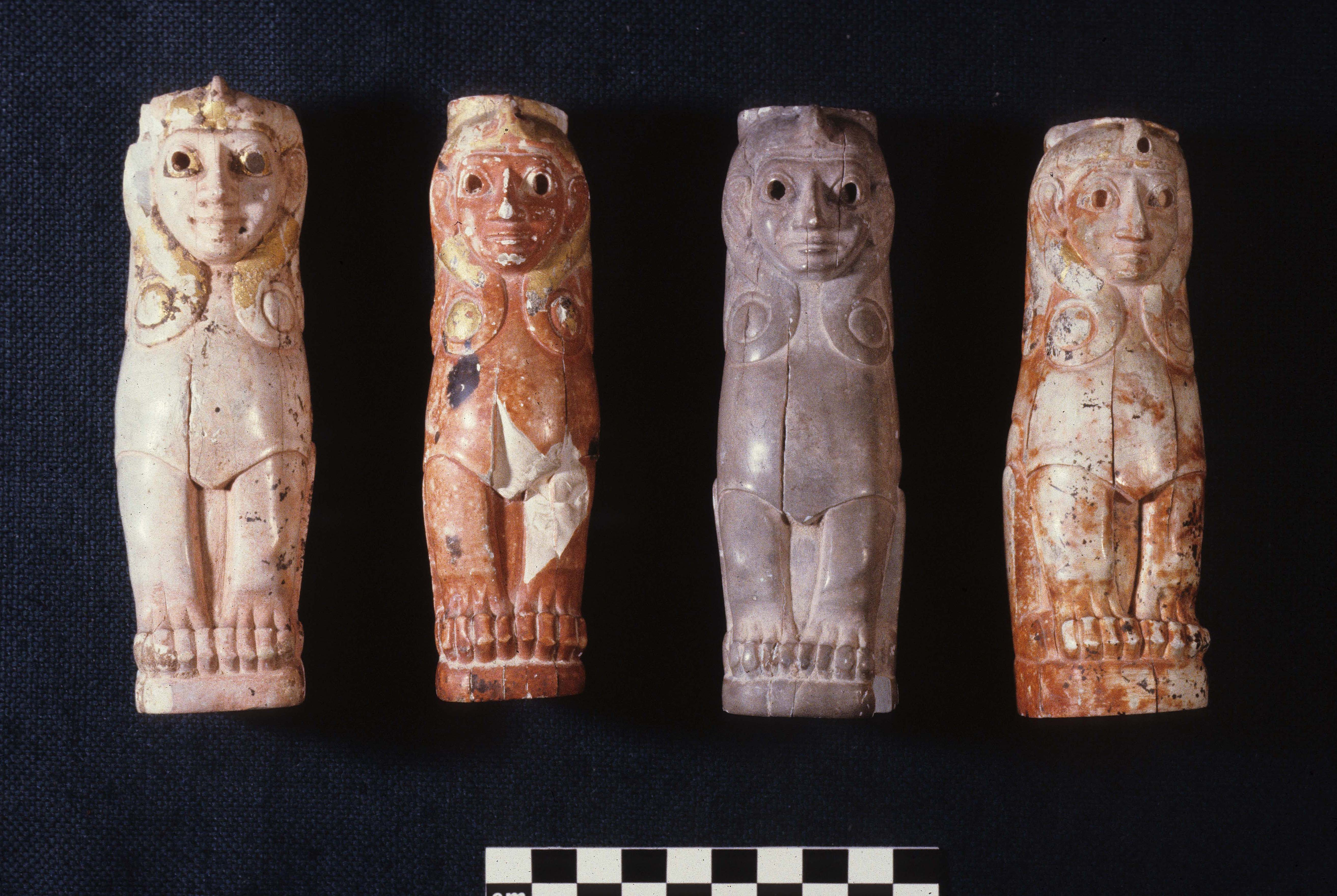
Four ivory sphinxes from Acemhöyük, Turkey. Pratt ivories, Metropolitan Museum of Art

Purushanda is first mentioned toward the end of the 19th century BCE in the records of Mari. Subsequent seals found at Acemhöyük suggest substantial trade between the two kingdoms as well as the possibility of dynastic intermarriage between the two royal houses. Syrian cylinder seals appear to be the dominant style during this period and resemble the seal of Matruna, the daughter of the king Aplahanda of Carchemish who reigned 1786-1766 BC. Some scholarship says that "that city was associated with an Anatolian or North Syrian network in which the Assyrians did not participate," while others state it "formed the westernmost limit of Assyrian commercial activity."

=== Late Bronze Age ===
==== Hittite period ====
The city is prominently mentioned in the Anitta Texts, a collection of Hittite writings unearthed at Kanesh. They depict it as a major seat of power in the region, describing its ruler as "Great King" (rubā'um rabi'um) whereas other rulers are merely "kings".

Purushanda features again in the stories of the campaigns of the 17th century BC Hittite ruler Anitta. The Purushandan kingdom appears to have been a significant rival of Kanesh, the kingdom ruled by Anitta. The Hittite king launched a war against Purushanda but according to the Anitta Text, a Hittite account of later date, the Purushandan king surrendered to the Hittite army:

When I went into battle, the Man of Purushanda brought gifts to me; he brought to me a throne of iron and a sceptre of iron as a gift. But when I returned to Nesa [Kanesh] I took the Man of Purushanda with me. As soon as he enters the chamber, that man will sit before me on the right.

The text indicates that the right to rule over Purushanda's territory – symbolised by the regalia of office, the throne and sceptre – was surrendered to Anitta. Its king was reduced to the status of a privileged vassal, entitled to join Anitta at the court in Kanesh in recognition of his voluntary surrender and his high-born status. The kingdom itself probably ceased to exist at this point and was absorbed into Hittite-ruled territory.

== Kings ==
Ruler	Date	Period	Comment
Nur-Daggal	c. 2330-2200 BC	Early Bronze IVA (Akkadian Period)	legendary great king contemporary with Sargon of Akkad.
Anitta*	c. 1650 BC	Middle Bronze II	*Conquered the kingdom with the Rise of the Hittite Old Kingdom.

== See also ==
- Luwians
