= Armi (Syria) =

Bronze Age city-kingdom in northern Syria

Armi Arman
- Unknown–c. 2290 BC
- Common languages: Eblaite
- Religion: Levantine religion (Hadad was the chief deity)
- Government: Absolute monarchy
- King
- Historical era: Bronze Age
  - Established: Unknown
  - Disestablished: c. 2290 BC
Succeeded by
Akkadian Empire
- Today part of: Syria

Armi, was an important Bronze Age city-kingdom during the late third millennium BC located in northern Syria, or in southern Anatolia, Turkey, at the region of Cilicia.

There is a question of whether or not Armi should be identified with Armanum, that is also mentioned in many texts of this period. According to Adelheid Otto (2006), it is "... generally accepted that Armanum should be identified with Armi/Armium of the Ebla texts ...", as opposed to Aleppo. But other scholars may disagree. Three different identifications of "Armi (Armium)" are given by Edwards (2019). This includes Samsat, Turkey, and Tall Bazi.

== History ==
=== Identification ===
Knowledge about Armi comes from the Ebla tablets. It has been identified with Aleppo, and with the Tall Bazi/Tall Banat archaeological complex on the bank of the Euphrates 60 km south of Jarabulus.

Piotr Steinkeller (2021) identifies Armi as a kingdom from Cilicia in southern Anatolia, Turkey, and considers that Ebla got timber from merchants of Armi who obtained it at Nur mountains, which were called "mountains of fir" by the Eblaites.

=== Relations with Ebla ===
Armi is the city most often referred to in the Ebla texts. Armi was a vassal kingdom for Ebla, it had its own kings and worked as a trade center and Trading intermediary for Ebla. Giovanni Pettinato describes Armi as Ebla's alter ego. However, the relations between the two cities is complicated, for it wasn't always peaceful: the texts of Ebla mention the exchange of gifts between the kings but also wars between the two kingdoms.

The relations between the two kingdoms are ambiguous, as ongoing work on the Ebla Tablets has revealed. Many Eblan merchants were active in Armi and vice versa, but despite intensive commercial exchange, it seems that relations deteriorated during the reign of the Eblan king Irkab-Damu's successor Isar-Damu, whose powerful vizier Ebrium waged war against Armi in his ninth year as vizier. The texts mention that the battle happened near a town called Batin (which might be located in northeastern Aleppo), and that a messenger arrived in Ebla with news of the defeat of Armi.

Ebrium's son and successor as vizier, Ibbi-Sipish, conducted a military campaign in his third year against the city of Bagara. The scribe who describes the campaign quotes a military expedition against Armi while speaking about the campaign against Bagara, which might mean that Bagara belonged to Armi.

Ibbi-Sipish conducted more military actions against Armi, and several other texts of his mention his campaigns against the kingdom. For example, he received linen textiles for one of these campaigns.

Relations between Ebla and Armi are no less complicated than the relations between Ebla and Mari. The Eblan texts mention two interdynastic marriages with the son of the king of Nagar and that of Kish, but despite very close relations between Ebla and Armi an interdynastic marriage is never attested.

During its final years, Ebla—in alliance with Nagar and Kish—conducted a great military expedition against Armi and occupied it. Ibbi-Sipish's son Enzi-Malik took up residence in Armi.

=== Fall ===
Armi wasn't mentioned after the destruction of Ebla. Many theories have been proposed for this destruction. Historian Michael C. Astour believes that the destruction of Ebla and Armi would have happened c. 2290 BC during the reign of Lugal-zage-si of Sumer, whose rule coincided with Sargon of Akkad's first years.

King Naram-Sin of Akkad mentions that he conquered Armanum and Ib-la and captured the king of Armanum, the similarities between the names led historian Wayne Horowitz to identify Armanum with Armi. If Armi was in fact Armanum mentioned by Naram-Sin, then the event can be dated to c. 2240 BC. In any case, it is clear that the whole of northern Syria including Ebla and Armi was under the domination of the Akkadian empire during the reign of Naram-Sin.

Naram-Sin gives a long description of his siege of Armanum, his destruction of its walls, and the capture of its king Rid-Adad. Astour believes that the Armanum mentioned in the inscriptions of Naram-Sin is not the same city as the Eblaite Armi, as Naram-Sin makes it clear that the Ebla he sacked (c. 2240 BC) was a border town of the land of Arman, while the Armi in the Eblaite tablets is a vassal to Ebla and (according to Astour), the Syrian Ebla would have been burned in 2290 BC (based on the political map given in the Eblaite tablets) long before the reign of Naram-Sin.

=== Language ===
The inscriptions of Armi, dated ca. 2500-2300 BC, are thought to contain the earliest attested Anatolian (and Indo-European) language — namely, a list of male personal names ending in -adu (such as La-wadu and Mu-lu-wa-du).

== See also ==
- Ebla
- Hadad
- Cities of the ancient Near East
