= Namar =

Village in Mazandaran province, Iran

Namar Persian: نمار
- Village
- Location within Iran
- Coordinates: 36°05′57″N 52°04′53″E
- Country: Iran
- Province: Mazandaran
- County: Amol
- District: Larijan
- Rural District: Larijan-e Sofla

Population (2016)
  - Total: 211
- Time zone: UTC+3:30 (IRST)

Namar (Persian: نمار) (Note: Also romanized as Namār; also known as Namārestāq, Namāristāq, and Namāristōq) is a village in Larijan-e Sofla Rural District of Larijan District in Amol County, Mazandaran province, Iran.

== Demographics ==
=== Population ===
At the time of the 2006 National Census, the village's population was 165 in 48 households. The following census in 2011 counted 140 people in 51 households. The 2016 census measured the population of the village as 211 people in 71 households.
