= Magan (civilization) =

Ancient region in what is now modern day Oman and United Arab Emirates

Location of foreign lands for the Mesopotamians, including Elam, Magan, Dilmun, Marhashi and Meluhha.

Magan (also Majan) was an ancient region in what is now modern day Oman and United Arab Emirates. It was referred to in Sumerian cuneiform texts of around 2300 BCE and existed until 550 BCE as a source of copper and diorite for Mesopotamia. As discussed by The Archeology Fund founded by Juris Zarins, "The Sumerian cities of southern Mesopotamia were closely linked to the Persian Gulf. Archaeologists and historians have linked sites in Saudi Arabia, Bahrain, and Qatar to the Sumerian geographical term of Dilmun. Oman, was most likely the Sumerian Magan".

== Location ==
Modern archaeological and geological evidence places Magan in the area currently encompassed by Oman and the United Arab Emirates.

In the past, historians had debated possible locations, including the region of Yemen known as Ma'in, in the south of Upper Egypt, in Nubia or the Sudan, and others as part of today's Iran and Pakistan. Other possible locations discussed for Magan included Bahrain, Qatar, and Makkan, suggested through linguistic links and the similarity between Baluchistan's historical name, "Makran", and "Makkan", a possible variant of Magan.

== History ==
=== Early Bronze Age ===
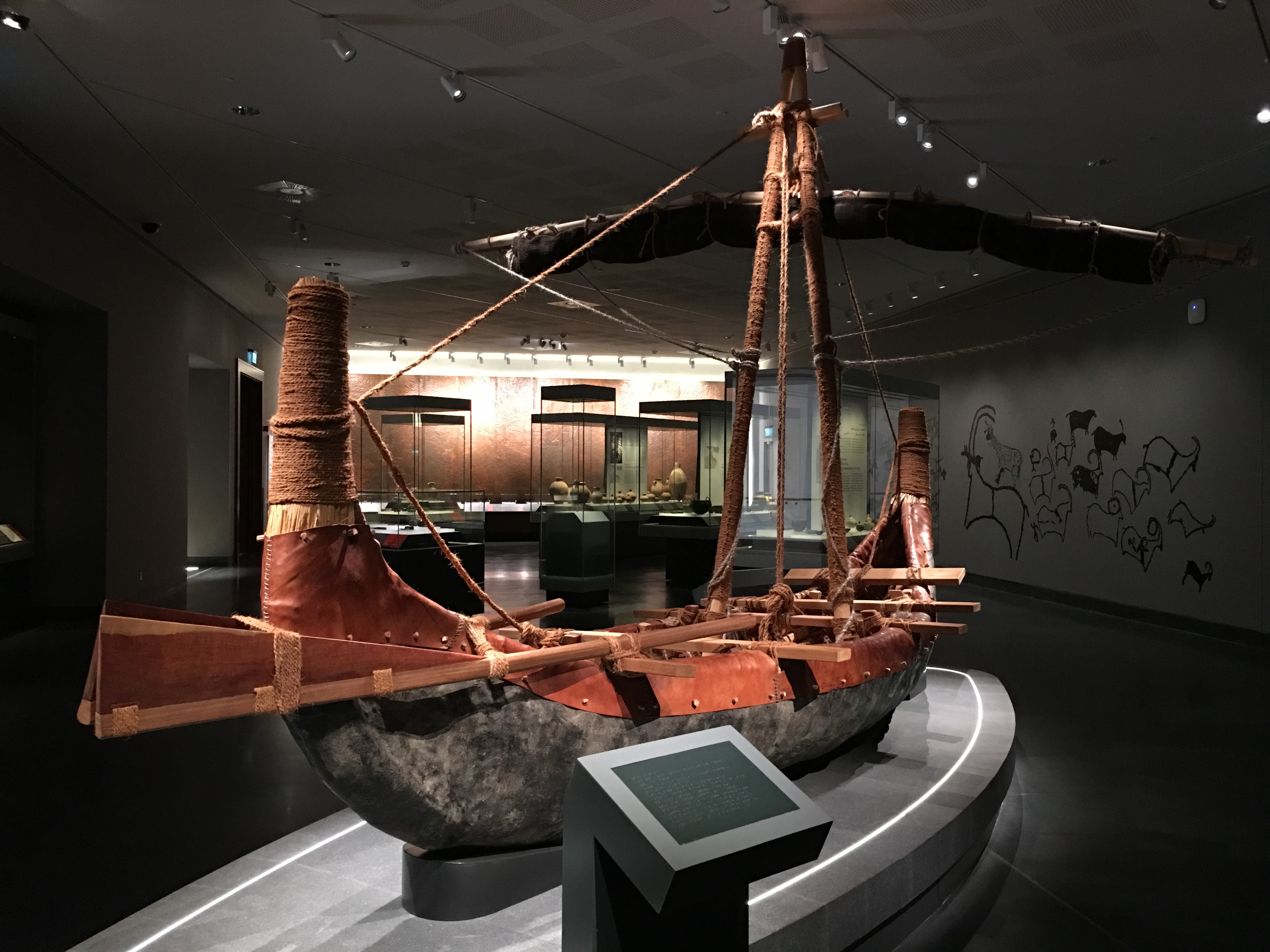
Model of a Magan boat

==== Early Dynastic period ====
The first Sumerian mentions of a land of Magan (Sumerian 𒈣𒃶 Magan, Akkadian Makkan) are made during the Umm al-Nar period (2600–2000 BCE), as well as references to 'the Lords of Magan'. Sumerian sources also point to 'Tilmun' (accepted today as being centered in modern Bahrain) and Meluhha (thought to refer to the Indus Valley).

==== Akkadian period ====
Akkadian campaigns against Magan took place in the twenty-third century BCE, again possibly explaining the need for fortifications, and both Naram-Sin and Manishtusu, in particular, wrote of campaigning against '32 lords of Magan'.

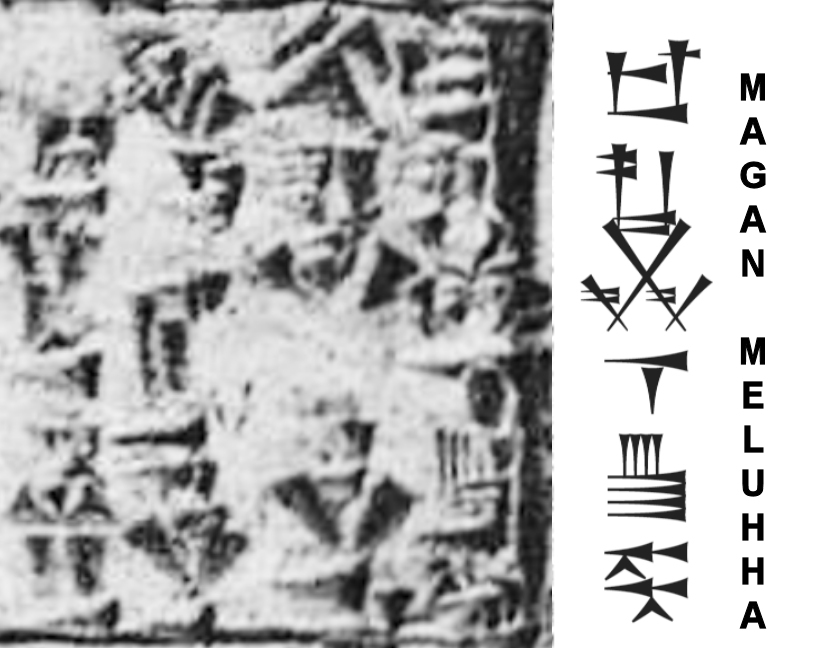
Gudea cylinders inscription A IX:19. Gudea mentions the devotions to his Temple: "Magan and Meluhha will come down from their mountains to attend". The words Magan (𒈣𒃶) and Meluhha (𒈨𒈛𒄩) appear vertically in the first column on the right.

Naram-Sin gave the Akkadian title Malek to the defeated ruler of Magan, a title which is cognate to the Semitic, including Arabic word for king, malik.

Magan was famed for its shipbuilding and its maritime capabilities: one Magan ship was capable of carrying around 20 tons of cargo, making each a formidable vessel. King Sargon of Akkad (2371–2316 BCE) boasted that his ports were home to boats from Tilmun, Magan and Meluhha. His successor, Naram-Sin, not only conquered Magan, but honoured the Magan King Manium by naming the city of Manium-Ki in Mesopotamia after him.

==== Ur III period ====
Trade between the Indus Valley and Sumer took place through Magan, although that trade appears to have been interrupted, as Ur-Nammu (2113–2096 BCE) laid claim to having 'brought back the ships of Magan'.

== Commerce ==
Archaeological finds dating from this time show trade not only with the Indus Valley and Sumer, but also with Iran and Bactria. They have also revealed what is thought to be the oldest case on record of poliomyelitis, with the distinctive signs of the disease found in the skeleton of a woman from Tell Abraq, in modern Umm Al Quwain.

Trade was common between Magan and Ur before the reigns of the Gutian kings over Ur. After they were deposed, Ur-Nammu of Ur restored the roads and trade resumed between the two nations (c. 2100 BC).

Magan trade may have also been influenced by cities further south in Oman. The Shisr site, recognized as Wubar (Ubar) by UNESCO's "Land of Frankincense" is one such location that could have provided a large supply of resins of both frankincense and myrrh: major trade routes from southern Oman to Iraq go through long stretches of Magan-Sumer occupied land. The resins on these trades routes was also sought after for medicinal properties: the Sumerians and the Magan-Sumerian people would have needed a steady supply to continue to make medicines and southern Oman, specifically the Dhofar Region, could supply the resins in necessary quantities.

== See also ==
- Dilmun
- Archaeology of the United Arab Emirates
- List of Ancient Settlements in the UAE
- History of the United Arab Emirates
- Umm Al Nar
- Archaeology of Oman
- History of Oman
