= History of Odisha =

The history of Odisha begins in the Lower Paleolithic era, as Acheulian tools dating to the period have been discovered in various places in the region. The early history of Odisha can be traced back to writings found in ancient texts like the Mahabharata, Maha Govinda Sutta and some Puranas. The region was also known to other kingdoms in region of East Indies due to maritime trade relations.

In 1568 CE, considered to be a pivotal point in the region's history, the region was conquered by the armies of the Sultanate of Bengal led by the iconoclast general Kalapahad. The region lost its political identity and the following rulers of the region were more often tributary lords than actual kings. By 1593, Odisha had passed completely to the Mughal Empire and became part of the Bengal Subah. After 1751, the Marathas gained control of the region. During the Maratha administration, literature and poetry flourished. In 1803, the region was passed onto the British Empire, where they divided the region into parts of other provinces. In 1936, the province of Odisha was formed on the basis of population of Odia-speaking people.

== Historical names of Odisha ==
The region which comprises the modern-day Odisha was not known by the same name throughout history. It and parts of it were referred by different names in different era.

- Kalinga: According to some scriptures (Mahabharata and some Puranas), a king Bali, the Vairocana, the son of Sutapa, had no sons. So, he requested the sage, Dirghatamas, to bless him with sons. The sage is said to have begotten five sons through his wife, the queen Sudesna. The princes were named Anga, Vanga, Kalinga, Sumha, and Pundra. The princes later founded kingdoms named after themselves. The prince Vanga founded Vanga kingdom, in the current day region of Bangladesh and part of West Bengal. The prince Kalinga founded the kingdom of Kalinga, in the current day region of coastal Odisha, including the Northern Circars. Ptolemy, Pliny the Elder and Claudius Aelianus have also mentioned one Calinga in their texts.
- Utkala: Utkala was a part of Kalinga in some parts of the Mahabharata. Karna is mentioned to have conquered kingdom of Utkala among others. But, according to other texts like the Raghuvamsa and the Brahma Purana, they were separate kingdoms. There are several views regarding the etymology of the name. Utkala may have meant northern (uttara) part of Kalinga or ut-Kalinga. Utkala desha (country or land) may have meant the land of "finest art" (utkarsha kala).
- Mahakantara: This name has been found in some Gupta-era inscriptions. It literally means "great forest" and it is usually identified with the modern-day Kalahandi and Jeypore region. The Mahabharata also mentions a Kantara, which may have or may not have referred to the same region.
- Udra: Udra (also Urda-desha) may have originally referred to an ethnic group or tribe called Udra. But later may have referred to the kingdom of Udra, around the coastal region of Odisha.
- Orda: Odra (also Orda-desha) similar to Udra, may have meant a tribe of people called Odra, but later came to refer to the land of Odras.
- Oddiyana: Oddiyana, mentioned in some Buddhist texts, according to some scholars may have referred to Odisha.
- Kamala Mandala: Literally "lotus region", a c. 13th-century inscription found in Narla in Kalahandi refers to the region by this name.
- South Kosala: South Kosala (also Dakshina Kosala) may refer to the modern-day Chhattisgarh and some part of Western Odisha. It should not be confused with Kosala, which is in current day Uttar Pradesh. According to the Ramayana, one of Rama's sons, Lava, ruled Uttara Kosala, and his other son, Kusha, ruled over this region. An English weekly named Kosal Horizon was started in August 2012, in Sundergarh district to publish news of western Odisha which is called Kosal.
- Kongoda: A copper plate found in Ganjam district refers to region as Kongoda (also spelled Kangoda).
- Trikalinga: This name has been found inscribed on some copper plates found in Sonepur. Tri-Kalinga may have literally meant "three Kalingas" and may have referred to the three states of Kalinga, South Kosala and Kangoda.
- Chedi: Chedi (also known as Chedirashtra) referred to the kingdom of Kharavela. It was named after his dynasty, Chedi (also Cheti dynasty and Mahameghavahana dynasty).
- Tosali: Tosali (also spelled Toshali) referred to a city and the region around it was called Tosala, possibly a subdivision of Kalinga in Ashoka-era. The capital of Tosala has been placed in modern-day Dhauli. In later era (c. 600 CE), North Tosali (Uttara Tosali) and South Tosali (Daskhina Tosali) have been mentioned, which were possibly kingdoms north and south of the Mahanadi river.
- Uranshin: The name has been used by some 10th century Arab geographers.
- Jajnagar: The name used for Odisha in the Tabaqat-i-Nasiri (c. 1260), Tarikh-i-Firuz Shahi (c. 1357), and other texts of the period.
- Odivissa: A name used in some Buddhist texts, including in those by Taranatha.

== Prehistory ==
140 million years ago (mya), the peninsular Indian Plate, including Orissa, was a part of the Gondwana supercontinent. Due to this, some of the oldest rocks in the subcontinent, dating to Precambrian times, are found in Orissa. Some of the rocks, like the Mayurbhanj granite pluton, have been dated to 3.09 billion years ago (Ga). The coal-fields in Mahanadi and Ib river basins are known to be one of the richest sites for fossils in the subcontinent. This has led to the discovery of new species, like the charophytes from the Permian Period, which were found in the Talcher region and the Upper Permian megaspores from the Ib river area.

In the districts of Mayurbhanj, Keonjhar, Sundargarh and Sambalpur, Acheulian tools dating to Lower Paleolithic times have been discovered. The Gudahandi hills in Kalahandi district have rock carvings and paintings dating to Upper Paleolithic. From Kuchai, near Baripada, various Neolithic tools like hoes, chisels, pounders, mace heads, grinding stones and also pieces of pottery. Prehistoric paintings and inscriptions have also been found in Garjan Dongar in Sundergarh district, and Ushakothi in Sambalpur district and Vimkramkhol in Jharsuguda district. There has been an uncertainty about the inscriptions at Ushakothi and Vimkramkhol regarding whether they are in a proto-Brahmi script. Yogimath near Khariar has cave paintings from the Neolithic.

== Ancient Odisha ==
=== Ancient texts ===
According to political scientist Sudama Misra, the Kalinga janapada originally comprised the area covered by the Puri and Ganjam districts.

According to some scriptures (Mahabharata and some Puranas), a king Bali, the Vairocana and the son of Sutapa, had no sons. So, he requested the sage, Dirghatamas, to bless him with sons. The sage is said to have begotten five sons through his wife, the queen Sudesna. The princes were named Anga, Vanga, Kalinga, Sumha and Pundra. The princes later founded kingdoms named after themselves. The prince Vanga founded Vanga kingdom, in the current day region of Bangladesh and part of West Bengal. The prince Kalinga founded the kingdom of Kalinga, in the current day region of coastal Odisha, including the North Sircars.

Kalinga in eastern coast

The Mahabharata also mentions Kalinga several more times. Srutayudha, the king of Kalinga, son of Varuna and river Parnasa, had joined the Kaurava camp in the Kurukshetra War. He had been given a divine mace by his father on request of his mother, which protected him as long he wielded it. But, Varuna had warned his son, that using it on a non-combatant will cause the death of the wielder himself. In the frenzy of battle, harried by Arjuna's arrows, he made the mistake of launching it at Krishna, Arjuna's charioteer, who was unarmed. The mace bounced off Krishna and killed Srutayudha. The archer who killed Krishna, Jara Savara, and Ekalavya are said to have belonged to the Sabar people of Odisha.

In the Buddhist text, Mahagovinda Suttanta, Kalinga and its ruler, Sattabhu, have been mentioned.

In the 6th century sutrakara (chronicler), Baudhayana, mentions Kalinga as not yet being influenced by Vedic traditions. He also warns his people from visiting Kalinga (among other kingdoms), saying one who visits it must perform penance.

=== Pre-Mauryan ===
Mahapadma Nanda the ruler of Magadha is presumed to have conquered Kalinga during his reign around c. 350 BCE. The Hathigumpha inscriptions mentions the suzerainty of the Nandas in the Kalinga region. The inscriptions also mention irrigation projects undertaken by the Nanda kings in the state during their reign.

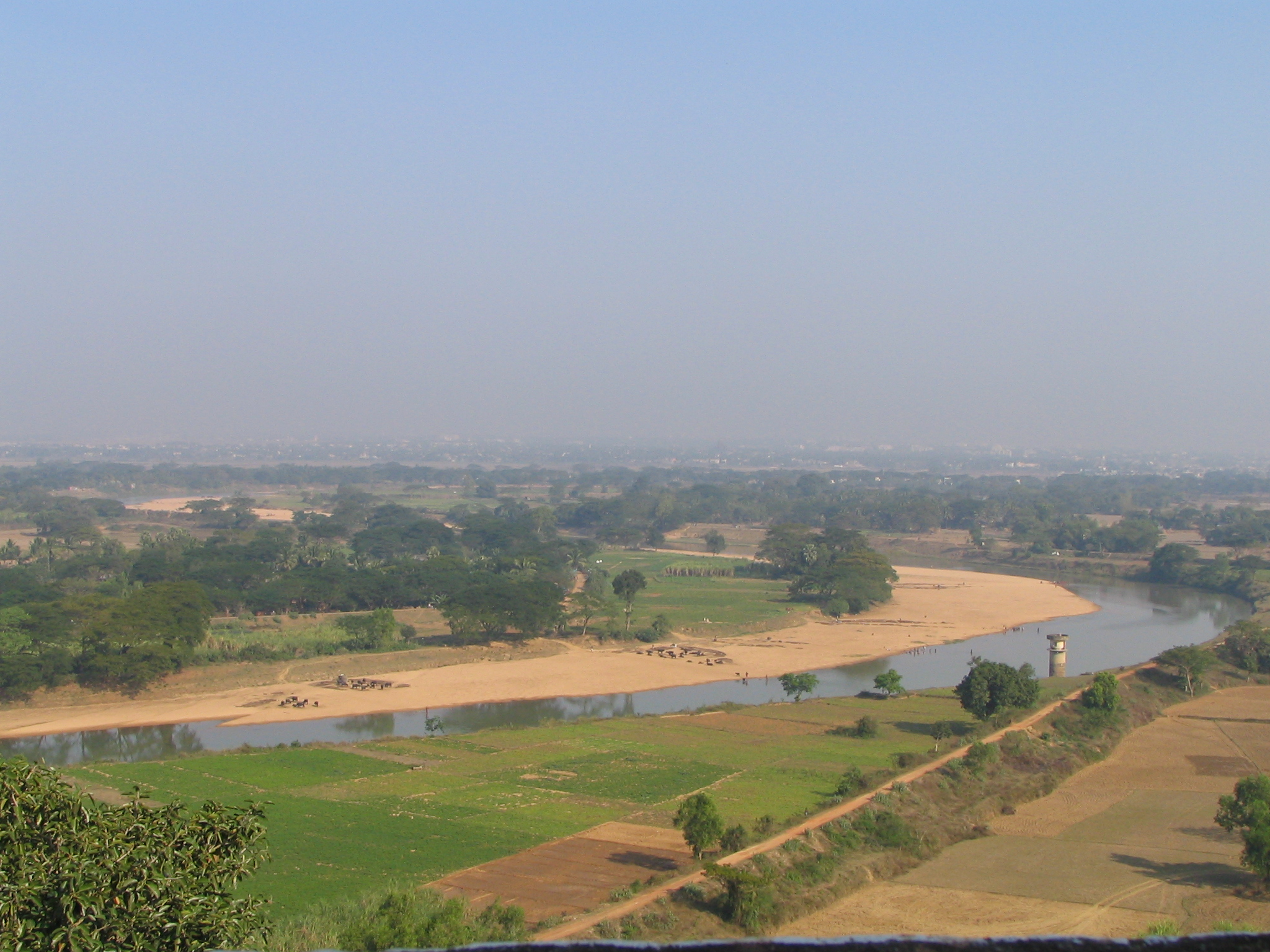
Daya River plains, near Dhauli, the supposed site of the Kalinga War

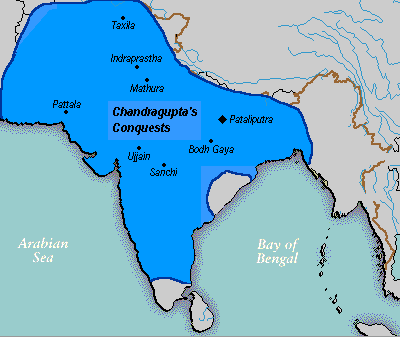
Kalinga and Maurya Empire before the invasion of Ashoka

In Asurgarh, beads and punched coins belonging to an unknown king dating to the pre-Mauryan period have been discovered.

=== Mauryan occupation ===
Ashoka of the Mauryan dynasty conquered Kalinga in the bloody Kalinga War in 261 BCE which was the 8th year of his reign. According to his own edicts, the war about 1,000,000 people were killed, 1,500,000 were captured and several more were affected. The resulting bloodshed and suffering of the war deeply affected Ashoka. He turned into a pacifist and converted to Buddhism.. However, Ashoka's eulogists like Charles Allen agree that his conversion to Buddhism predated the Kalinga war. Moreover, he seems to have had links with Buddhists for a decade before his conversion. The evidence suggests that his conversion to Buddhism was more to do with the politics of succession than with any regret he felt for sufferings of war.

The Kalingans had used personnel from the Atavika region, which was in the west of Kalinga, during the war. According to his edicts, Ashoka conquered the coastal region of Kalinga but didn't try to conquer the Atavika region. The Mauryans governed the Kalinga region as a province. They used Tosali as the regional capital and judiciary center. A kumara (viceroy) ruled from Tosali, modern-day Dhauli. Samapa, modern-day Jaugada, was another administrative centre. Ashoka erected two edicts in the region, at Jaugada and Dhauli.

=== Kharavela ===
In the 1st century BCE, Mahameghavahana established the Mahameghavahana dynasty in Kalinga. Kharavela was the third ruler of the dynasty. He reigned in the second half of the 1st century BCE. Most of the information about Kharavela comes from the Hathigumpha inscription in Udayagiri near Bhubaneswar. The inscription also calls the dynasty as Chedi (also spelled Cheti) The inscription records his life from his boyhood to his 13th regnal year.

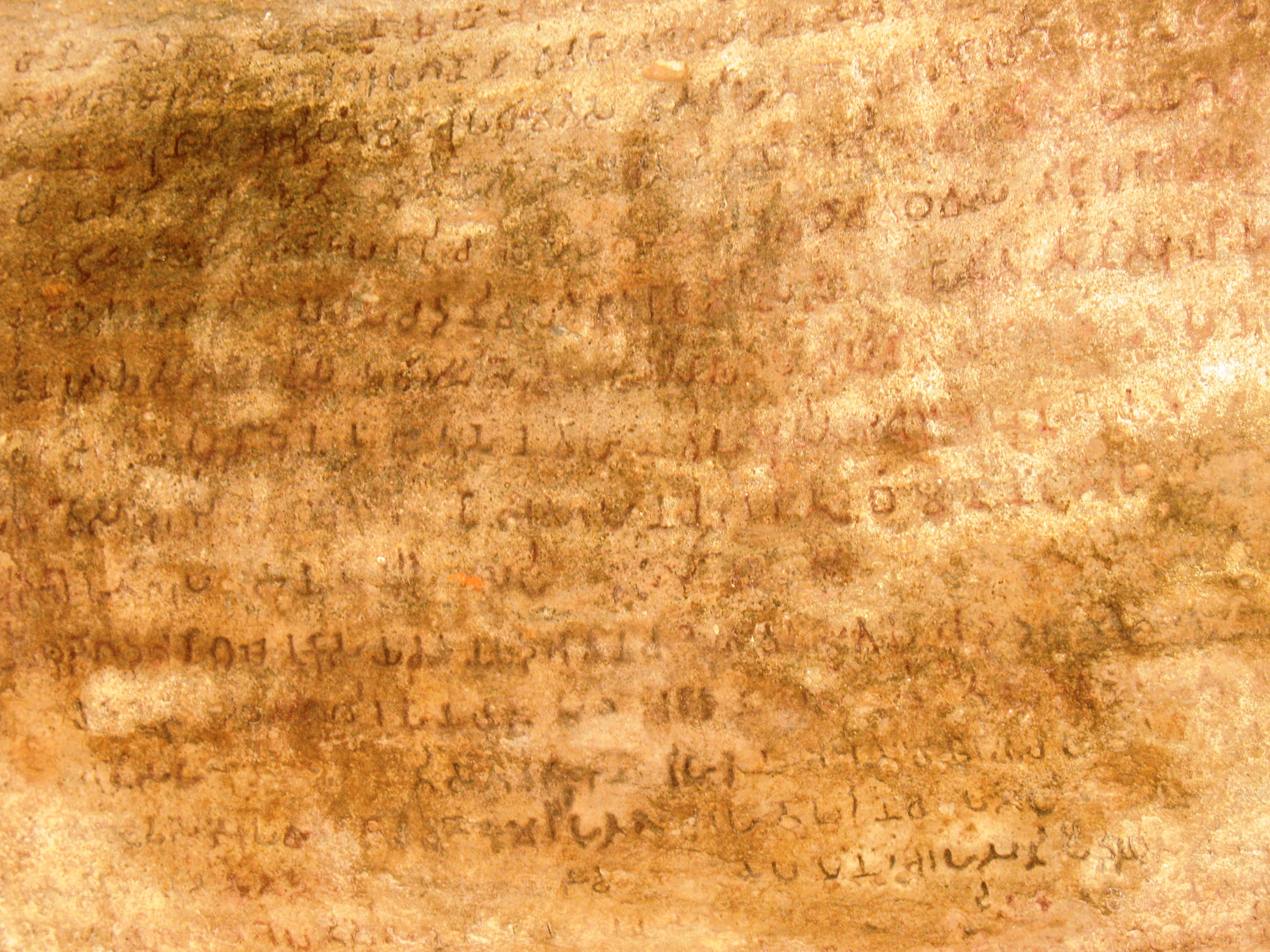
Hathigumpha inscription of King Khāravela at Udayagiri Hills

- Reigning year 1–5 : Kharavela took up the administration after the premature death of his father as a yuvaraj (heir apparent). He ascended to the throne as a proper King when he came of age at 24, around c. 170 BCE, but the date is contentious by several decades. In the first year of his coronation, he repaired the gates and ramparts of his capital Kalinganagari which had been damaged by storm. In the second year, he invaded the territory of the Satavahana king Satakarni I and marching up to the Kanha-bemna river (possibly Krishna River) stormed the city of Musikas. In the 3rd year of his reign, he organized various performances of dance and music and delighted the people of the capital. In the fourth year, he again invaded the Satavahana kingdom and extended his political supremacy over the region. In the fifth year he is known to have renovated the aqueduct that was originally excavated three hundred years back by the Nandas.
- Reigning year 6–10 : In the sixth year, he remitted taxes and gave benevolences both in urban and rural areas of his kingdom. The account of his seventh year is not known. But that year his chief queen, Queen of Vajiraghara ("The Queen of the Diamond Palace") gave birth to a child. In his eighth regnal year he led a military expedition against Rajagaha (Rajagriha). By that time the Yavana (Indo-Greeks) who were in possession of Mathura were advancing towards Pataliputra. But getting the news of the triumph of Kharavela at Rajagriha the Yavana king had to retreat to Mathura. Kharavela pursued the Yavana ruler, Dimita (possibly Demetrius I) and purged them out of Mathura, which was an important seat of Jain religion and culture. In commemoration of this achievement, he built a victory palace in Kalinga at a cost of thirty-eight hundred thousand penas during the ninth year of his reign. In the tenth regnal year, he again invaded northern India the account of which is not clearly known.
- Reigning year 11–13 : In the eleventh year of his reign, Kharavela defeated the Dramira country which had been in existence for hundred and thirteen years before his time. In the twelfth year, he invaded northern India for the third time and advanced as far as Uttarapatha. On his return, he terrorized Magadha. Bahasatimita (a Shunga king), the king of Magadha surrendered and Kharavela brought back the statue of Kalinga Jina. Kalinga Jina was the statue of Rishabhanatha, which had been taken away from Kalinga by Mahapadmananda three hundred years back and its restoration was considered to be a great achievement of Kharavela. In his thirteenth reigning year, Kharavela excavated a number of cave-dwellings in the Kumari hills for the Jain monks and bestowed endowments for them. Jainism greatly flourished in Kalinga under the patronage of Kharavela. He was also extending liberal patronage towards other religious communities and earned great reputation as the worshipper of all faiths and the repairers of all temples. He also built the caves at Udayagiri and Khandagiri for Jain monks.

The record stops at his 13th regnal year. It is presumed that he was succeeded by his son, Kudepasiri. The Mahameghavahana dynasty (or a successor Sada dynasty) probably continued to rule over Kalinga and Mahishaka as evident from the inscriptions and coins discovered at Guntupalli and Velpuru, Andhra Pradesh, which mention a series of rulers with the suffix Sada.

=== Satavahanas, Kushanas and Murundas ===
Odisha Timeline
500 BCE – 1300 CE
c. 350 BCE	Mahapadma Nanda conquers Kalinga
261 BCE	Ashoka conquers Kalinga in the Kalinga War
c. 170 BCE	Coronation of Kharavela
c. 639 CE	Hiuen-Tsang visits Oddiyana
c. 885 CE	Janmejaya I establishes the Somavamsi dynasty
c. 1135 CE	Anantavarman Chodaganga shifts his capital to Kataka
c. 1245 CE	Narasimhadeva I builds the Konark temple
c. 1278 CE	Queen Chadrika builds the Ananta Vasudeva Temple

Gautamiputra Satakarni is known to have invaded Kalinga during his reign. The Nashik prashasti inscription of Gautamiputra's mother during the reign of Vasisthiputra Pulumavi, located in the Nasik Caves, states that his orders were obeyed by the circle of all kings and calls him the lord of mount Mahendra among a list of other mountains.

The Kushan Empire may have reached Kalinga or parts of it during the first three centuries of the common era as evident from coins found at several places in notably in Jaugada, Sisupalgarh and Gurubai in Manikapatana (Puri) among others. More imitation coins are found than real ones. So, the local rulers possibly circulated them in the post-Kushana period. There is coin of one Maharaja Rajadhiraja Dharmadamadhara which has been found in Sisupalgarh. There is a Kushana motif on one side and a human head on the other.

During the 3rd century, a tribe called Murundas, ruled from Pataliputra. They have been speculated to have arrived from Central Asia. They used to issue coins similar to Kushana coins.

But other than these mostly numismatic evidences, this period of history is mostly in the dark.

=== Guptas, Matharas and Sharabhapuriyas ===
In c. 313 CE, a princess of Kalinga, Hemamala, is recorded to have fled the kingdom with a tooth of Buddha, a sacred relic, hidden in her hair and presented it to king Sirimeghavanna of Sri Lanka. According to the legend, Khema took a tooth from the pyre of Buddha and later gave in to a king, Brahmadutta. He built a temple at a city called Dantapura. After several generations, during the reign the Guhasiva, the prince of Ujjain came to Dantapura to worship the relic. He married the daughter of Guhasiva, Hemamala, and was later called Dantakumara (Prince Tooth). When a king attacked Kalinga, Dantakumara and Hemamala fled with the relic to protect it.

Samudragupta (reign c. 335 – c. 375 CE) is presumed to have conquered the region, as in his Allahabad inscription, it has been mentioned that, he had conquered Mahêndra of Kôsala, Vyâghraraja of Mahâkantâra, Mantarâja of Kêrala, Mahêndra of Pishtapura, Svâmidatta of Kottûra on the hill, Damana of Êrandapalla, Vishnugôpa of Kâñchi, Nîlarâija of Avamukta, Hastivarman of Vengî, Ugrasêna of Palakka, Kubêra of Dêvarâshtra, Dhanamjaya of Kusthalapura, and others. Pishtapura (modern-day Pithapuram) is presumed to be the then capital of Kalinga. Mahakantara is presumed to be parts of western Odisha and Central India. Kottura is traced to modern day Ganjam district.

In post-Samudragupta period, a new dynasty called Matharas arose in south Kalinga, they ruled from Pishtapura but also issued copper grants from Simhapura. Their kingdom was probably spread from Mahanadi to Godavari.

Another dynasty of rulers arose in western Odisha during post-Gupta period, they are called Sharabhapuriya dynasty. Not much is known about this dynasty. Everything known about them, comes from the inscriptions on copper plates and coins. They may or may not have also been known as the Amararyakula dynasty. This dynasty is supposed to have started by one Sarabha, who may have been a feudal chief under the Guptas. They ruled over the modern-day region of Raipur, Bilaspur and Kalahandi. Their rule lasted from c. 499 to about 700 CE.

=== Shailodbhava dynasty ===
The Shailodbhava dynasty ruled parts of modern Odisha during the 6th-8th centuries. Their core territory was known as Kongoda-mandala, and included parts of the present-day Ganjam, Khordha and Puri districts. Their capital was located at Kongoda, which is identified with modern Banapur. The Shailodbhava kingdom was known as Kongoda-mandala. After conquering present-day Odisha, the Gauda king Shashanka created the Kongoda-mandala province, and appointed Sailodbhava ruler Madhavaraja II as his feudatory in the region.

Madhavaraja II soon gained independence, as noted from the Khordha inscription which describes him as Sakala-Kalingadhipati, the lord of the entire Kalinga), although there is little evidence to prove that he actually conquered the whole of Kalinga given his contemporary Ganga king Indravarman also claimed to have conquered the whole of Kalinga. His inscriptions state that he performed the ashvamedha and other sacrifices, presumably to assert his independence. He was succeeded by his son Dharmaraja who was a strong ruler, and reigned for at least 30 years. In the Nimina inscription, he assumed the royal titles Paramabhattaraka, Maharajadhiraja, and Parameshvara. Later the Shailodbhavas fell into obscurity and their territory appears to have become part of the Shvetaka Gangas, who were vassals of the Bhauma-Karas. By the 8th century feudatory of the Kongoda-mandala, which was now a province of the Bhauma-Kara kingdom.

=== Bhauma-Kara dynasty ===
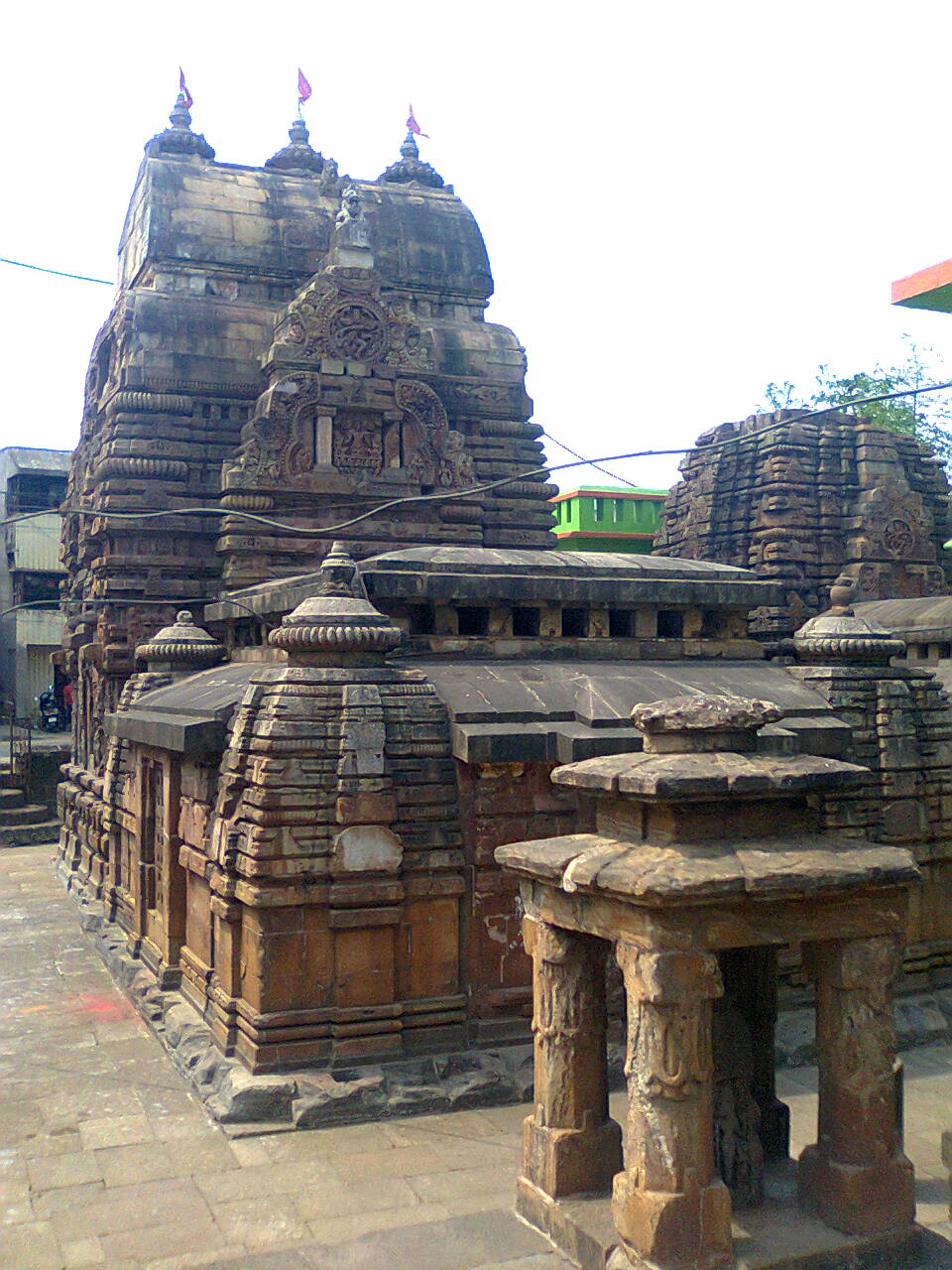
Vaitala-Deula temple

The Bhauma-Kara dynasty, ruled in parts of Odisha in eastern India between 8th and 10th centuries and their kingdom was known as called Toshala. By the last quarter of the 8th century, the Bhauma-Karas had gained control of the former Shailodbhava territory. The early rulers of the dynasties followed Buddhism, and its later rulers followed Shaivism and Vaishnavism. The earlier Bhauma-Kara kings appear to have ruled the northern Toshali area, while the Shailodbhavas, who ruled the southern Kongoda region. The dynasty puled most of the coastal Odisha by the time of king Shivakara I (c. 756/786). According to the Ganjam inscription of the Shvetaka Gangas, Shivakara I conquered Kongoda and the northern Kalinga.

Shantikara I, the younger son of Shubhakara I, married Tribhuvana Mahadevi I, a daughter of the Western Ganga king Rajamalla. The Dhenkanal inscription of Tribhuvana-Mahadevi I (c. 846) mentions the tumultuous shape of the Bhauma-Kara kingdom before her father Rajmalla put an end to the Rashtrakuta-Pala domination. She reunified the kingdom and with her successors the Bhauma-Kara period saw the beginning of the unification of historically distinct regions such as Odra, Toshala, Kongoda and Utkala.

=== Somavamshi dynasty ===
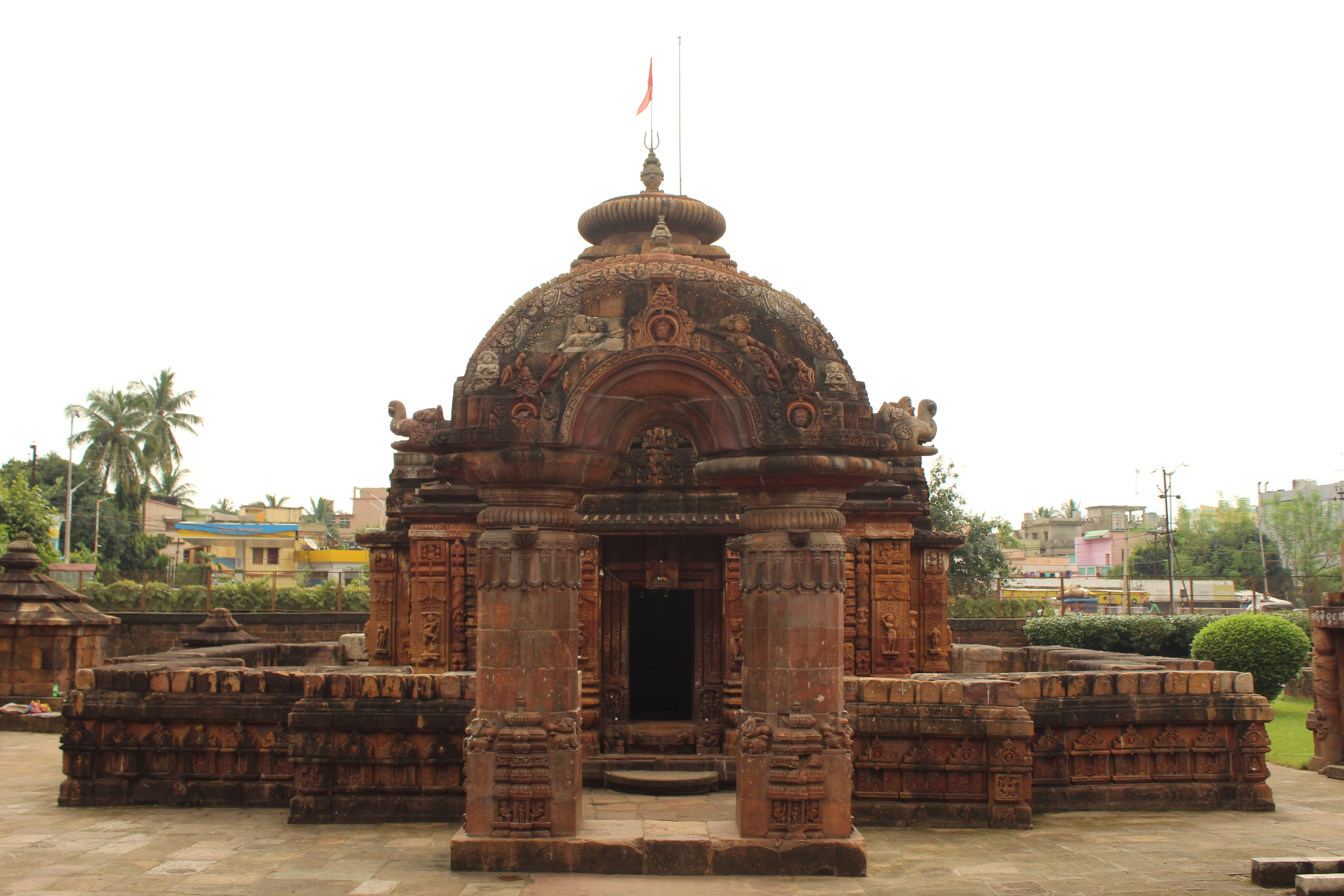
Mukteswar Temple

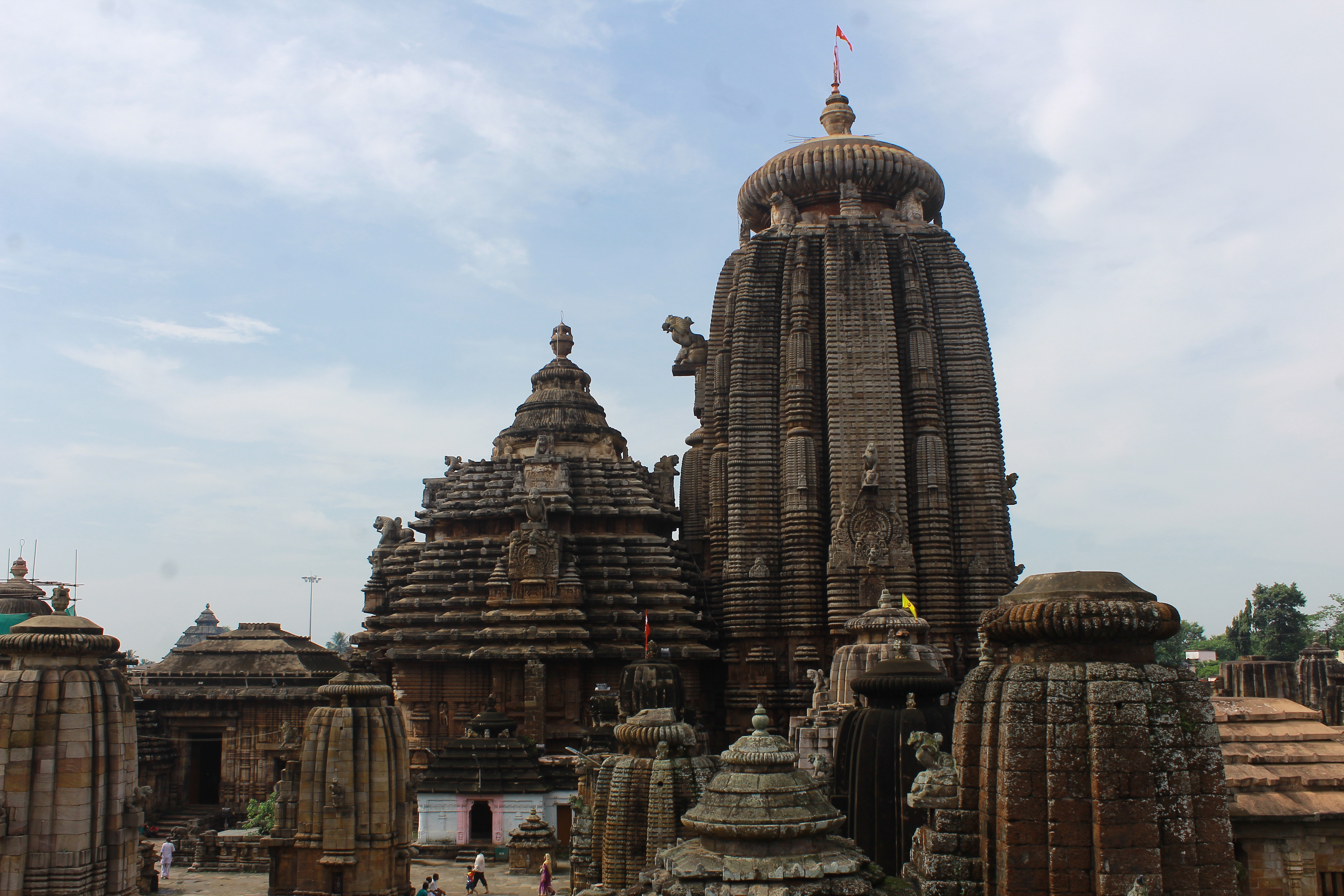
Lingaraj Temple

The Somavamshi dynasty, also known as Keshari dynasty ruled parts of present-day Odisha in eastern India between the 9th and the 12th centuries. Their capitals included Yayatinagara (now modern Binika) and Abhinava-Yayatinagara (now modern Jajpur). The early Somavamshi kings ruled in the region of the eastern part of Dakshina Kosala, which now forms much of western Odisha. The Chaudwar inscription of the earliest known Somavamshi king Janamejaya describes him as Kosalendra (i.e. lord of Kosala). During his long reign of 34 years, Janmejaya issued a number of copper-plate grants at various places across western and coastal Odisha. This suggests that Janmejaya consolidated the Somavamshi rule in western Odisha and by his 31st regnal year, he issued three grants from Kataka, which has been identified as Chaudwar near modern Cuttack. This suggests that his influence extended to eastern Odisha by the end of his reign.

Yayati I (c. 922–955), the son of Janmejaya I, made a large number of grants in the Dakshina Kosala which are recorded on the inscriptions issued at Yayatinagara. The capital was later moved to the Guheshvarapataka (modern Jajpur) after the conquest of the Bhauma-Kara kingdom, following which it was renamed to Abhinava-Yayatinagara (the new city of Yayati). Yayati I is credited with building of a new temple at Puri, and installing the image of Purushottama (Jagannatha) there. His reign marks the beginning of the Somavamshi style of temple architecture, which features new forms of ornamentation and iconography in Odisha. An important epoch that marked the reign of Yayati I was the initiation of the Utkaliya era which seems to correspond to the reign of the legendary early Somavamshis (Kesaris) as per the chronicle Madala Panji, thus implying the start of the era for the Odia calendar.

=== Eastern Ganga dynasty ===
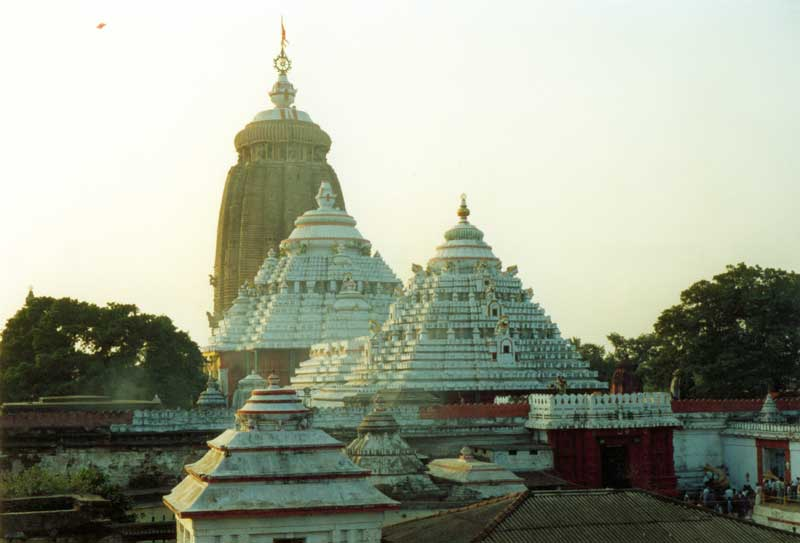
The Jagannath temple was built by rulers of the Eastern Ganga dynasty.

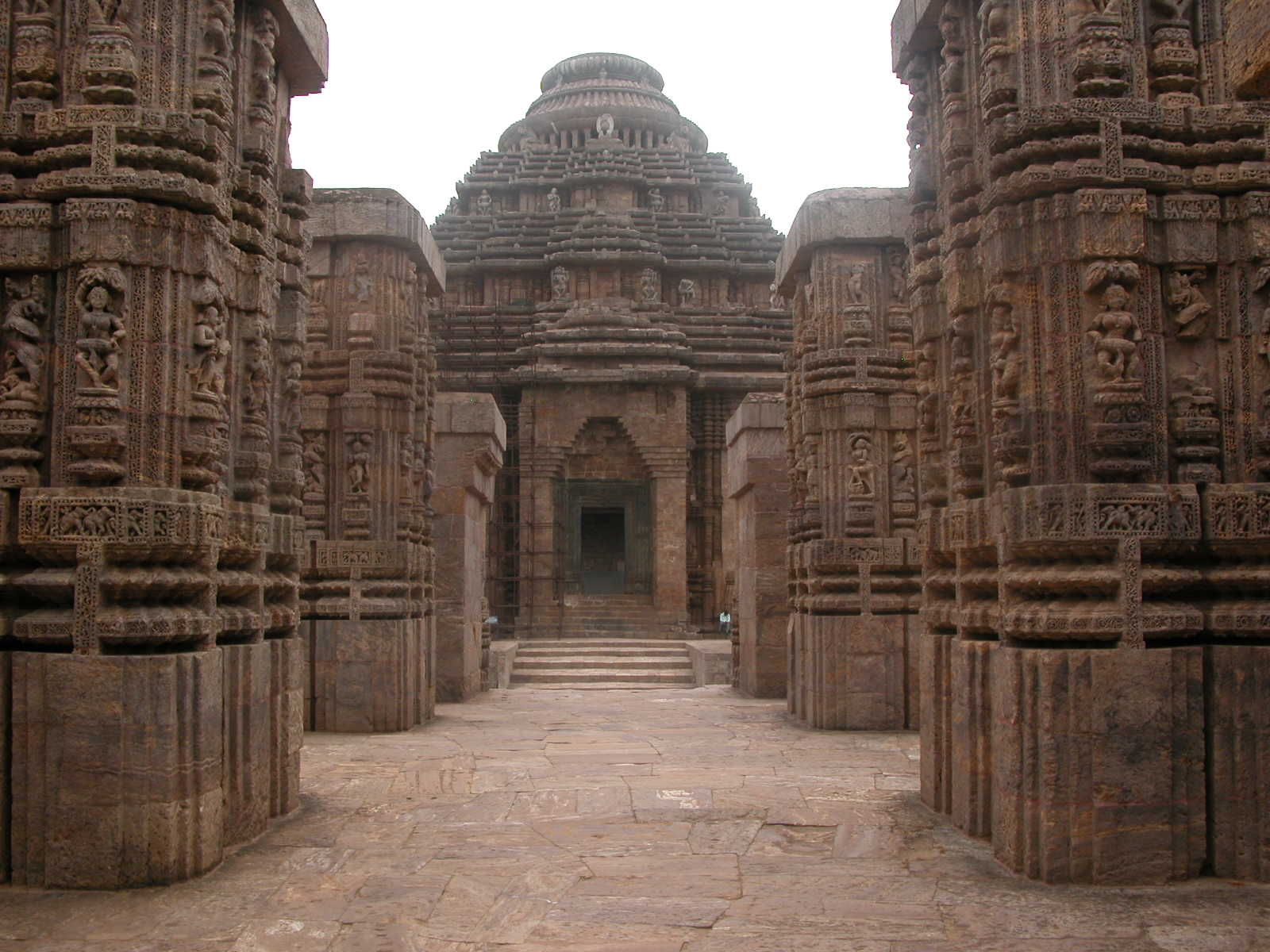
Narasimhadeva I is known to have built the Konark temple.

Indravarman I is assumed to be the earliest known king of the Eastern Ganga dynasty. His Jirjingi grant mentions no predecessors and was issued in his 39th regnal year, c. 537 CE. He had his capital at Dantapura. Another plate found also mentions him defeating a Vishnukundina king called Indra Bhattaraka. Many rulers of this dynasty went by the title Trikalingadhipati, literally the "lord of the three Kalingas". The capital was later shifted to Kalinganagara, later during the reign of Devendravarman I (c. 652–682?).

During this period, c. 639 CE, Xuanzang visited this region, he notes that Mahayana Buddhism was widely practiced in this region. He mentions the existence of the monastery called Pushpagiri. The sites were lost until recently. New excavations have found several Buddhist monuments dating to this period. Kalinga was invaded and pillaged by Kulottunga I in 1100, after Anantavarman Chodaganga decided not pay his annual tribute. The event was later the subject of the Tamil poem Kalingattuparani.

The capital was again shifted to Kataka by Anantavarman Chodaganga in 1135. He is said to have started building the Puri Jagannath temple. The temple was later completed by his successor Anangabhima Deva III. Narasingha Deva I is known to have built the Konark temple.

In 1187, Nissanka Malla who ascended to the throne in Sri Lanka claimed to have descended from Kalinga. He may have been born in 1157 in the capital of Kalinga, Sinhapura (modern day Srikakulam, now in Andhra Pradesh). In 1215, an invader from Kalinga, called Kalinga Magha landed in Sri Lanka and had an oppressive reign of 21 years.

By the early 12th century, Kalinga had been conquered by Kulothunga Chola I and his general Karunakara Tondaiman. The literary work called Kalingathu Parani, is written in praise of the invasion.

According to the text Tabaqat-i Nasiri, the ruler of Jajnagar (Kalinga) began to harass the Lukhnauti (Bengal) ruler in 1243. Tughral Tughan Khan the governor of Bengal advanced against Jajnagar in March 1244. The armies encountered after a month at the frontier fort of Katashin and the Kalingan army retreated after taking losses. Later, when the army of Khan was having lunch, the Kalingan army flanked them and attacked. The defeated army of Khan then retreated.

== Medieval Odisha ==
=== Gajapati Empire ===
Orissa Timeline
1200 CE - 1800 CE
1434 CE	Coronation of Kapilendradeva
c. 1467 CE	Sarala Dasa writes the Oriya Mahabharata
1559 CE	Mukunda Deva seizes the throne
1568 CE	Bengal Sultanate conquest of Odisha
1590–1593 CE	Mughal conquest of Odisha
3 March 1575	Battle of Tukaroi takes place in Balasore
1623	Shah Jahan visits Orissa
1751	Alivardi Khan cedes Orissa to Marathas

The Gajapati Empire was established by Kapilendra Deva in 1435, after the fall of the last Eastern Ganga king, Bhanudeva IV. The dynasty is also known as a Suryavamsi dynasty. In about 1450, Kapilendra Deva installed his eldest son, Hamira, as the governor of Rajamundry and Kondavidu. Kapilendra Deva managed spread his kingdom from Ganga in the north to as far as Bidar in the south by 1457.

During Kapilendra Deva's reign, Sarala Das, the Odia poet, wrote the Odia Mahabharata and his other works.

When Kapilendra Deva died in 1467, a civil war occurred to capture the throne, among his sons. In the end, Purushottama Deva succeeded in securing the throne in 1484 by defeating Hamvira. But, during this period significant southern parts of the empire were lost to Saluva Narasimha, the ruler of Vijayanagara. By the time of his death, he had managed to recover most these territories by capturing Saluva Narasimha.

He was succeeded by his son, Prataparudra Deva, in 1497. Immediately, he had to face the armies of Alauddin Husain Shah of Bengal. During his reign, Alauddin Husain Shah attacked again in 1508, this time the Muslim army marched up to Puri. In 1512 Krishna Deva Raya of the Vijayanagara Empire invaded Kalinga and defeated the forces of the Gajapati Empire.

Govinda Vidyadhara was a minister under, Gajapati king, Prataparudra Deva. But, he rebelled against him and succeeded in ascending the throne in 1541, after murdering the two sons of Prataparudra Deva.

=== Bhoi dynasty ===
The Bhoi dynasty was founded by Govinda Vidyadhara who came to throne in a bloody coup, in 1541. The dynasty was short-lived and during this period the kingdom came under conflict with neighbouring kingdoms and reeled with civil wars. First, Raghubhanja Chhotray who was the nephew of Govinda Vidyadhara, became a rebel. Govinda was succeeded by his son, Chakrapratap, who was an unpopular ruler. After he died in 1557, a minister called Mukunda Deva rebelled. He killed the last two Bhoi kings and squashed the rebellion of Raghubhanja Chhotray. After that, he declared himself the Gajapati of Odisha.

=== Mukunda Deva ===
Mukunda Deva (also known as Mukunda Harichandana) came to throne, in 1559, in a bloody coup. According to the Madala Panji (temple records), he was a Chalukya. During this period, Odisha was going through many internal conflicts. Mukunda stuck an alliance with Akbar, that he made him a foe of Sulaiman Khan Karrani, the ruler of Bengal. Sulaiman sent his son, Bayazid Khan Karrani and his infamous general, Kalapahad, to conquer Odisha, in 1567.

Mukunda met the forces in the north but had to withdraw to stop a rebellion after signing a treaty with the Sultan's son. Mukunda was killed in a battle with the rebel forces led by Ramachandra Bhanja. Ramachandra Bhanja was a feudal lord under Mukunda, who had rebelled. He himself got caught up in the conflict and was murdered by Bayazid. Akbar was preparing for the invasion of Chittor, so he was unable to respond. Kalapahad ran across the kingdom in a plundering spree and destroyed several temples. By end of 1568, Odisha was under the control of Sulaiman Khan Karrani.

During this period, Ramachandra Deva I, who was the son of a general and had been imprisoned by Mukunda, escaped from prison and fled to Vizagapatam.

==== 1568 ====
1568 is considered an important date in the history of Odisha, as Mukunda Deva is considered the last independent ruler of Odisha. After 1568, the region saw a steady decline. Odisha was not to be an independent kingdom again. Later in 1920, Odia playwright, Ashwini Kumar Ghose wrote a play called Kala Pahada based on the exploits of Kalapahad and the tragic death of Mukunda Deva. The play is considered one of the greatest tragedies in Odia literature.

=== Karrani rule ===
In 1568, Odisha came under the control of Sultan Sulaiman Khan Karrani of the Karrani dynasty, who was the ruler of Sultanate of Bengal. The Sultan assigned Ismail Khan Lodhi of Prithimpassa as the governor of Orissa.

In the Battle of Tukaroi, which took place in modern-day Balasore, Daud Khan Karrani was defeated and retreated deep into Odisha. The battle led to the Treaty of Katak in which Daud ceded the whole of Bengal and Bihar, retaining only Odisha. The treaty eventually failed after the death of Munim Khan (governor of Bengal and Bihar) who died at the age of 80. Daud took the opportunity and invaded Bengal. This led to the Battle of Rajmahal in 1576, where Daud was defeated and executed.

== Modern era ==
=== Mughal rule ===
In 1590, Qutlu Khan Lohani, an officer of Daud the Sultan of Bengal, declared himself independent and assumed the title of "Qutlu Shah". Raja Man Singh who was the Mughal governor of Bihar, started an expedition against him. Before facing Man Singh, Qutlu Shah died. Qutlu Khan's son Nasir Khan, after little resistance, accepted Mughal sovereignty and paid homage to Man Singh on 15 August 1590. Nasir Khan was then appointed Governor of Odisha and signed a treaty which ceded the region of and around Puri. Nasir Khan remained faithful to the Mughal empire for two years but after that he violated the conditions of his treaty by laying siege to the Jagannath Temple of Puri. Man Singh attacked Nasir Khan and decisively defeated him on 18 April 1592 in a battle near the present day Midnapore town. By 1593, Odisha had passed completely to the Mughal empire and was a part of Bengal Subah.

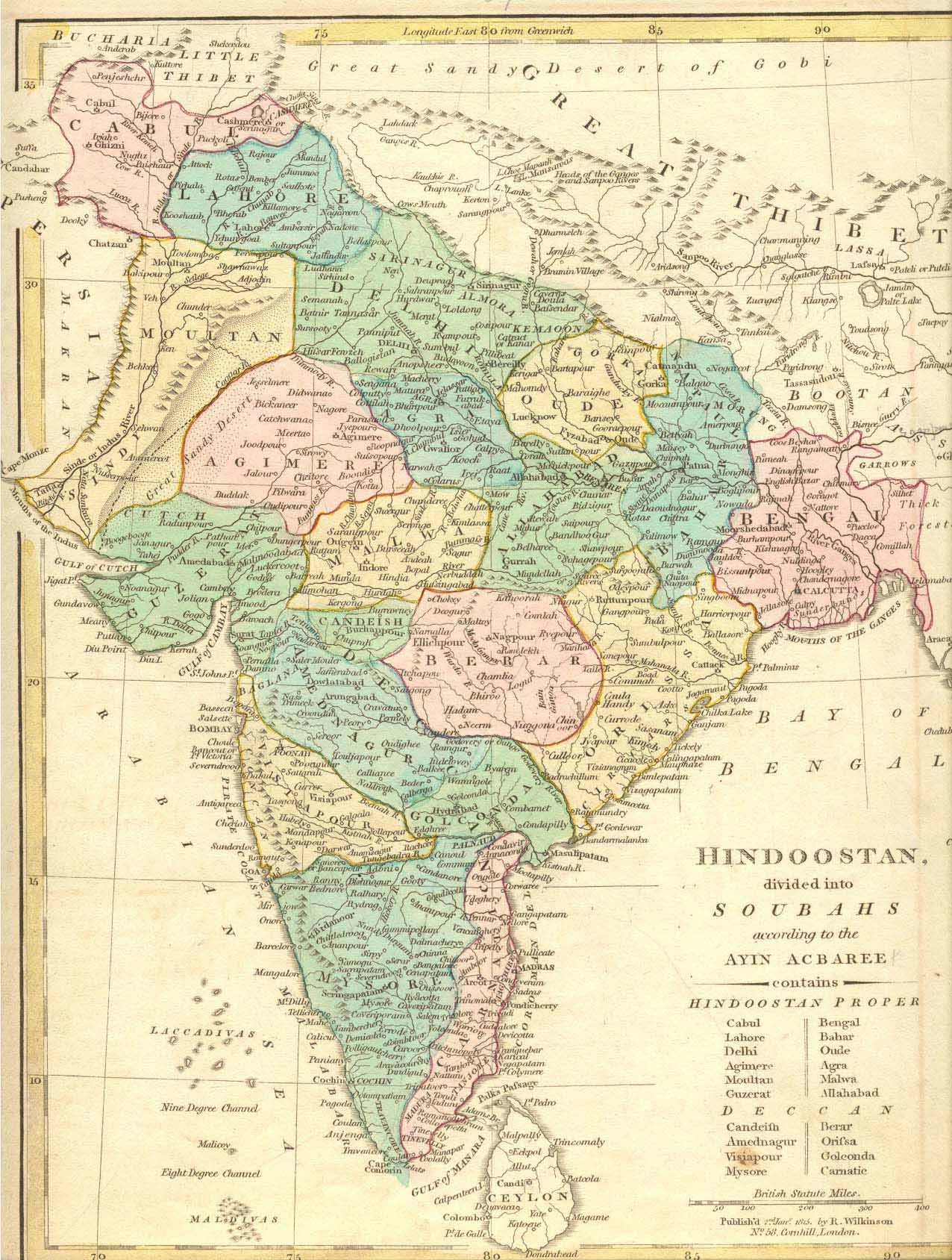
Map of Subahs under Mughal rule

==== Under Akbar ====
Raja Ramachandra Deva, the king of Khurda, had accepted Akbar's suzerainty. Akbar mostly followed a policy of non-interference in the local chieftains' matters. After Akbar, his son, Jahangir came to power, who followed a different policy. Under him, Odisha was made into a separate Subah and a governor, titled Subahdar, ruled in the name of the Mughal emperor.

==== Under Jahangir ====
Quasim Khan was appointed the governor of Odisha in 1606. During this period, the king of Khurda, Purusottam Deva was attacked by Mughal armies led by Kesho Das. He was defeated, and had to offer his sister and daughter along with dowry to buy peace.

In 1611, Kalyan Mal, son of Todar Mal came to be the governor of Odisha. Kalyan Mal also attacked and defeated Purusottam Deva, who had to send his daughter to the Mughal harem. In 1617, Kalyan was recalled to the court.

In 1617, Mukarram Khan became the governor of Odisha. He also tried to attack Purusottam Deva. But, Purusottam Deva fled from Khurda. In 1621, Ahmad Beg was made the governor of Odisha. Purusottam Deva died in exile in 1622 and was succeeded by his son Narasimha Deva. According to the Madala Panji (temple chronicles), prince Shah Jahan had visited Odisha in 1623, which was just after his rebellion. Ahmad Beg remained governor until 1628.

==== Under Shah Jahan ====
In 1628, Shah Jahan became the Mughal emperor and Muhammad Baqar Khan was appointed the governor of Odisha. He extended his influence well into the kingdom of Golconda. In 1632, he was recalled. Shah Shuja was appointed by Shah Jahan as the Subahdar of Bengal from 1639 until 1660. From 1645 onwards, a deputy of Shuja called Zaman Teharani was the governor of Odisha. Orissa was the first subah (imperial top-level province) added to Akbar's fifteen by Shah Jahan. It had Cuttack as seat and bordered Bihar, Bengal and Golconda subahs, as well as the remaining independent and tributary chiefs. In 1647, Narasimha Deva was beheaded by a Mughal general called Fateh Khan.

==== Under Aurangzeb ====
In 1658, Shah Jahan took ill and Dara Shikoh took on as the royal regent. This led to a war of succession in which Aurangzeb emerged victorious in 1659. He imprisoned his own father, who later died in 1666. During this period of instability in the Mughal empire, several chieftains in Odisha had declared independence. Khan-i-Duran was appointed the governor under Aurangzeb and his reign was from 1660 to 1667. During this period, he crushed several rebel chieftains and subdued Mukunda Deva I, the then king of Khurda.

=== Nawab of Bengal rule ===
==== Under Murshid Quli Khan ====
In 1707, Aurangzeb died and the control of Mughals over Odisha began to weaken. Murshid Quli Khan was made governor of Odisha in 1714. In 1717, he was also made the Nawab of Bengal. He swore fealty to the Mughal emperor but he was an independent ruler for all purposes. He took several measures to increase revenues and create several new Jagirs. In 1727, on his death, his son-in-law, Shuja-ud-Din became the Nawab of Bengal. Before that he was a deputy of Murshid in Odisha. During his time, several tracts of land were lost to neighbouring kingdoms.

==== Under Shuja-ud-Din ====
In 1727, Taqi Khan, the son of Shuja-ud-Din, was made the governor. He got engaged in a war with Ramachandra Deva II. Ramachandra Deva II was imprisoned and was converted to Islam. Ramachandra Deva II once visited Puri to see Ratha-Yatra. Taqi Khan was displeased by this advanced on Khurda and Ramachandra Deva II fled. Bhagirathi Kumar, son of Ramachandra Deva II, was declared king by Taqi Khan. Taqi Khan died in 1734. During his reign, several Islamic monuments were built in Odisha.

His successor, Murshid Quli Khan II (alias. Rustam Jung), a Naib Nazim (deputy governor) of Shuja-ud-Din and also his son-in-law, allowed worship in Puri and he is said to have given his daughter to Ramachandra Deva II in marriage after he converted to Islam. He installed Padmanava Deva as king of Khurda in 1736 but replaced him by Birakesari Deva, son of Ramachandra Deva II in 1739. Shuja-ud-Din died in 1739 and was replaced by his son, Sarfaraz Khan. Sarfaraz Khan was defeated and killed in the Battle of Giria by Alivardi Khan. Rustam Jung marched against Alivardi Khan but he was defeated. Alivardi Khan was not a popular ruler.

The Marathas started raiding Alivardi Khan's territory starting in 1742, aided by Rustam Jung and his allies. These raids used quick hit-and-run tactics and were called bargis. Alivardi Khan unable to check the raids ceded Odisha to Raghoji I Bhonsle in 1751.

During this period, the idols of Jagannath and other deities were removed from the temple several times, and hidden to save them from iconoclasm.

=== Maratha rule ===
By 1751, the Marathas controlled the administration of Orissa. The river Subarnarekha served as the border between Bengal and Maratha-controlled Odisha.

The Marathas improved Orissa's profile as a pilgrimage site, especially to the Jagannath Temple where maintenance and repairs were strongly encouraged. They paid extra attention to uphold religious sites. The Marathas instituted the pilgrim tax for their income at Puri, which was exempt for paupers. The Marathas expanded on road construction, erection of houses and even experimented with a postal service. However, external trade declined in Maratha-held Orissa. With the rise of British power in the Bengal region and their chokehold on maritime trade in the Bay of Bengal; exports of grains and commodities declined sharply for locals.

Literature and poetry blossomed in Odisha under the rule of the Marathas. This was due to patronization of the local chiefs and other Maratha rulers. Kavya and Padya literature, of both prose and poetry made significant headways during this period.

The strategic position of Orissa for trade was understood by Britain, as it was situated between British-held Bengal and Madras. In 1803, the British conquered the region during the Second Anglo-Maratha War, when most of the Maratha forces were engaged elsewhere.

=== European trade and influences ===
Odisha Timeline
1800 CE - 1947 CE
14 October 1803	Fort of Barabati falls to the British
1817	The Paika Rebellion
1866	The Great Famine of 1886 (Na Anka Durvikhya)
1 April 1936	Orissa became a separate province
15 August 1947	India becomes independent

==== Early Portuguese and British trade ====
The Portuguese were the first Europeans to build factories in Odisha. They had their first settlement in Pipli, Baleswar district. The British had established their first settlement in Hariharpur (modern-day Jagatsinghpur), with the permission of the Mughal Badshah Shah Jahan, as early as 1633 to trade cotton goods. But it could not be maintain long because of the harsh climate, and Portuguese and Aracanese pirates. In 1765, Lord Clive acquired the diwani of Bengal, Bihar and Odisha from titular Mughal emperor, Shah Alam II. But, only the Midnapore district was meant by Odisha, as rest of it had passed on to the Marathas. Lord Clive had tried to negotiate the acquisition of Odisha from the Marathas. His successor, Warren Hastings, had also tried negotiating with the Marathas.

==== Princely States of Odisha and British administration ====
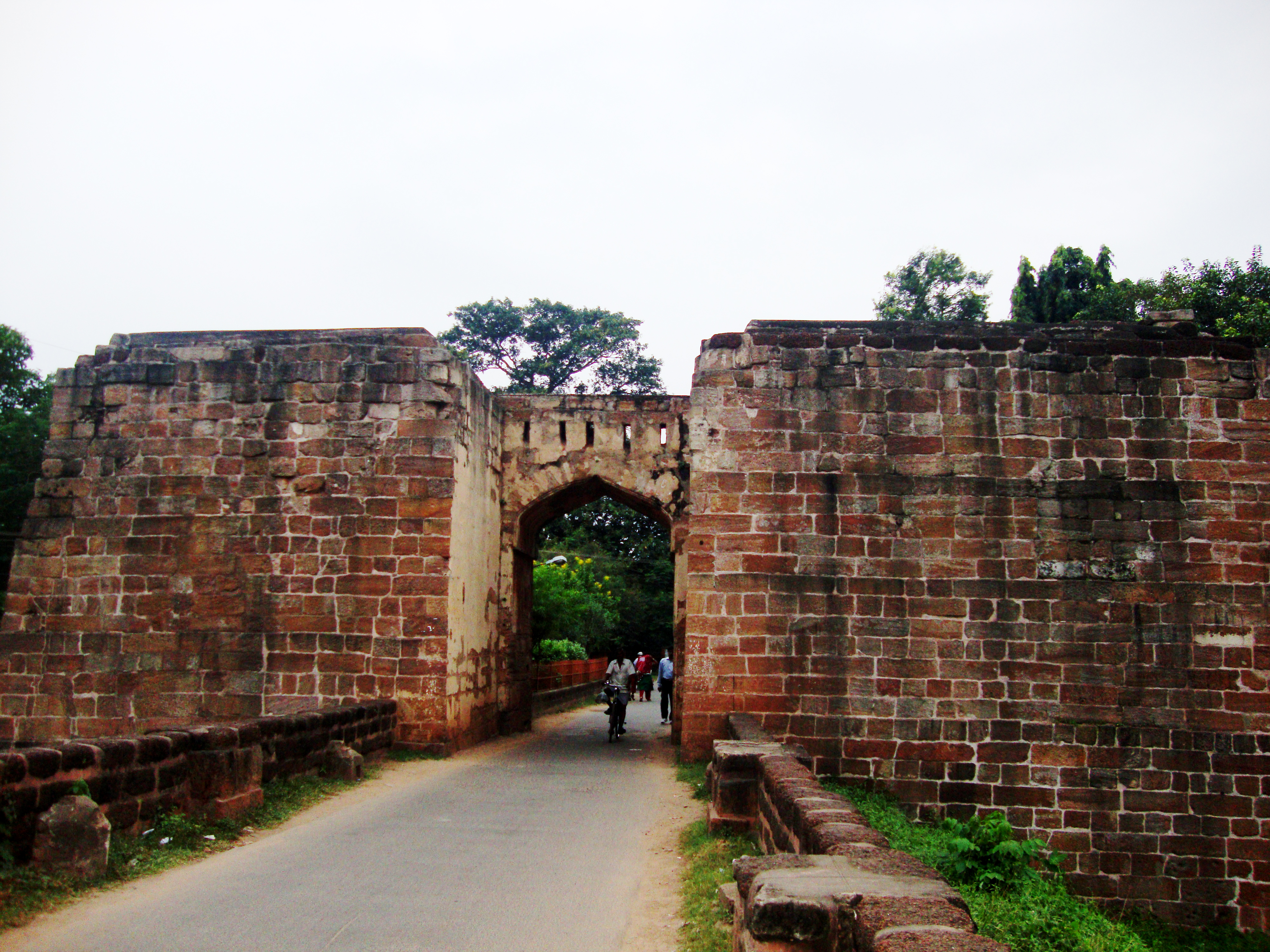
Ruins of Barabati fort in Cuttack.

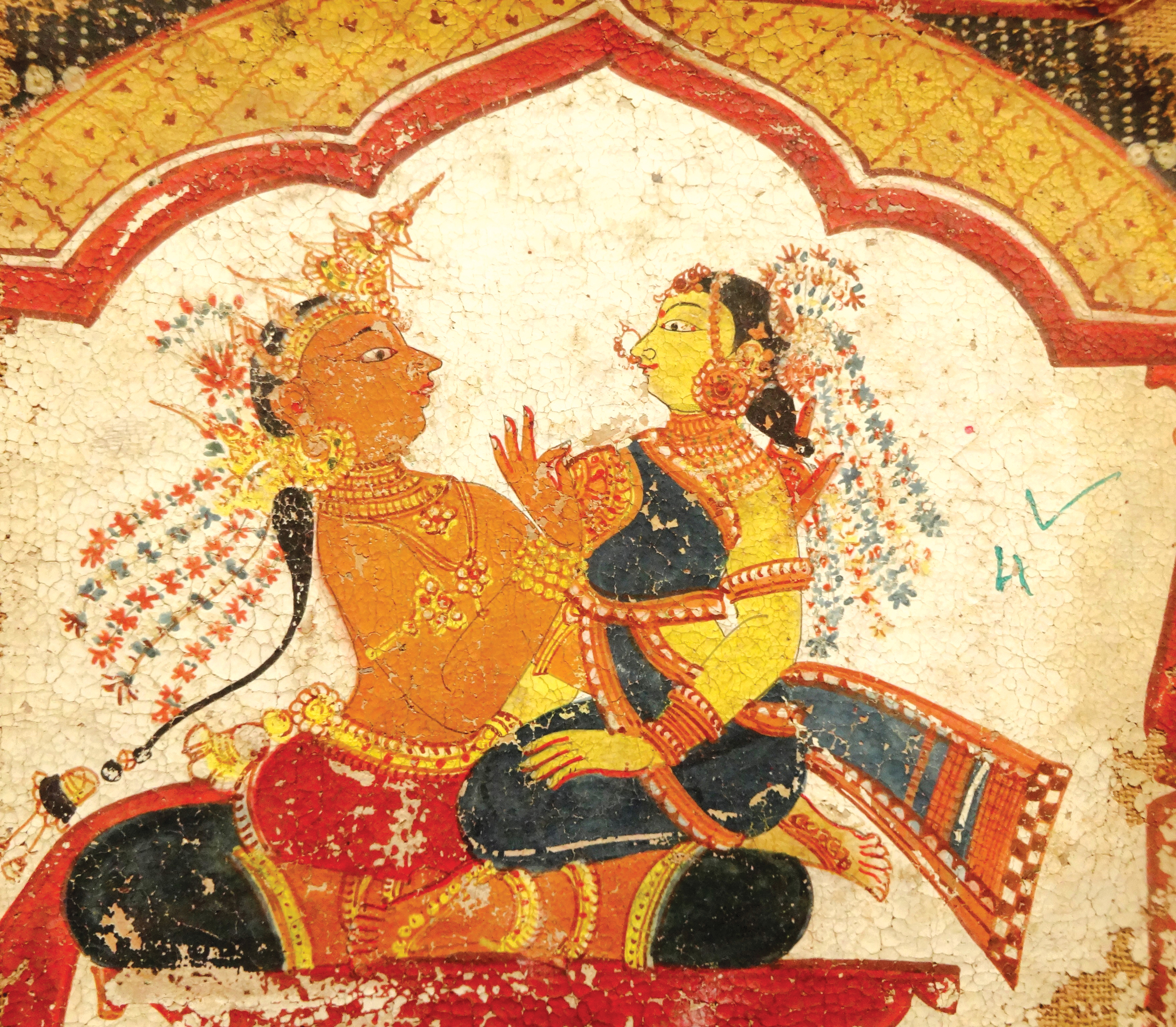
Two lovers, folio from a Ragamala album. Pigment on cloth, in the technique closely resembling that used in Odishan pattachitras. Circa 1850

A Colonel Harcourt of the Presidency armies sailed from Northern Circars on 3 August 1803 and landed on 25 August. He marched from Ganjam with 5000 men on 8 September, to flush the Marathas out of the region. On 18 September, Harcourt took control of Puri. On 21 September, a second force had landed at Balasore and after taking control of the region, it sent reinforcements to Cuttack to help with the siege of the fort. On 14 October, the fort of Barbati was stormed and captured.

On 17 December 1803, Raghoji II Bhonsle of Nagpur signed the Treaty of Deogaon (also Deogarh) in Odisha with the British East India Company after the Battle of Laswari and gave up the province of Cuttack (which included the coastal Mughalbandi plain, Garhjat the princely states of Western Odisha, Balasore port, and parts of Midnapore district of West Bengal). The region was subsequently administered by the British as a division until 1912 of the Bengal Presidency with its administrative seat in Cuttack, the princely states remaining under indirect rule.

Jayakrushna Rajaguru Mohapatra, (better known to the Indian public as Jayi Rajaguru) the royal preceptor to Mukunda Dev II (who at the time was still a minor) mobilised an army of Paika warriors and led a revolt against the East India Company in 1804, which was the first uprising against British rule in Orissa. However, the Presidency armies, with the assistance of local chiefs, were ultimately able to suppress the rebellion, and both Jayi Rajaguru and the Raja were captured. On 6 December 1806, Jayi Rajaguru was executed in Midnapore.

In 1817, the British had to suppress the Paika rebellion. The Paika were a landed militia who were exempted from taxes in lieu of their services. They were dissatisfied with the new British land laws and were led by Bakshi Jagabandhu, a commander of the king of Khurda.

Surendra Sai from Sambalpur region had started a rebellion against the British in 1827. During the Indian Rebellion of 1857, the princes of Odisha did not join the wars.

In 1866, Odisha was struck with a great famine, called Na Anka Durvikhya (literally the nine number famine) locally. The death toll has been estimated to be about one million spread across different regions. During the famine, Babu Bichitrananda Das and Gouri Shankar Roy decided to publish a magazine in Odia. The first issue of Utakala Deepika appeared on 4 August 1866 from the newly Cuttack Printing Press. It dealt with issue of famine. Though Christian missionaries had established a printing press in Cuttack in 1838, this was the first independent publication in Odia.

In 1870, Madhusudan Das became the first person from Odisha to acquire a graduate degree. He had completed his Bachelor of Arts from Calcutta University and later went on to acquire a Master of Arts from the same university in 1873. He also acquired a law degree in 1878. He went on to become one of the foremost leaders from the state.

After Madhusudan Das returned from Calcutta to Cuttack in 1881, the Utkal Sabha was formed in 1882. It marked the beginning of political activities in Odisha. In 1888, a durbar was held in Cuttack during the visit of Lieutenant-Governor of Bengal, where the Utkal Sabha led by Gouri Shankar Roy presented the issue of bringing Odia-speaking territories under one administration.

In 1903, the Utkal Union Conference was founded. In 1912, Odisha and Bihar were separated from Bengal province to form a new single province. In 1912, the Orissa Tenancy Act was introduced the Bihar-Orissa Legislative Assembly. The previous Bengal Tenancy Act of 1885 was considered ill-suited for the conditions of the region. On 12 September 1913, the Orissa Tenancy Act was passed, securing better rights and treatment for ryots in the region. In 1913, Sashi Bhusan Rath began publishing the first Odia daily newspaper, Asha, from Berhampur. Gopabandhu Das was the editor and wrote its editorials until 1919. In 1915, Gopabandhu Das began publishing a magazine called Satyabadi, to promote Odia literature and culture. On 4 October 1919, he started his own weekly newspaper, Samaja. In 1914, the revolutionary Bagha Jatin moved to a hideout in Kaptipada village in Mayurbhanj. On 9 September 1915, Bagha Jatin and his companions were discovered by the colonial authorities and it resulted in a 75 minutes gunfight. On 10 September 1915, Bagha Jatin died of bullet wounds at the Balasore hospital.

In 1885, Indian National Congress was founded. In 1920, it adopted reorganization of provinces according to linguistic basis as one its agendas. This inspired many leaders in Odisha to form an Odisha Congress Committee and demand a separate province for the Odia-speaking population. In 1923, the Bhubanananda Odisha School of Engineering was established in Cuttack. It was the first technical diploma institution in the region. In 1927, the districts of Cuttack and Balasore were hit by abnormal floods for the third successive year. About 28,756 families were affected by the floods according to the government report.

On 6 April 1930, a group of volunteers marched from Cuttack to Inchudi in Balasore. On 12 April, they defied the British salt tax law by making salt. On 1 April 1936, Odisha was granted the status of a separate province. Odisha Day (Utkala Dibasa) is celebrated locally every year on 1 April to mark the day. In 1936, Odisha has 6 districts: Cuttack, Puri, Balasore, Ganjam, Koraput, and Sambalpur. On 11 October 1938, Baji Rout, a ferry boy of 12 years, was shot dead by policemen in Dhenkanal district, when he refused to ferry them across the river. In 1943, the Utkal University was founded.

In March 1946, the foundation stone for the Hirakud Dam was laid by the Governor of Odisha, Sir Hawthrone Lewis. Also in 1946, the Central Rice Research Institute (CRRI) was established in Cuttack to prevent occurrences like the Bengal famine of 1943. On 22 July 1947, Biju Patnaik rescued the Indonesian Prime Minister Sutan Sjahrir and Vice President Mohammad Hatta from behind Dutch lines and flew them to Singapore in a Douglas C-47 Skytrain, disguised as crew members. They reached India on 24 July.

== As a part of the Republic of India ==
Orissa Timeline
1947 CE – Present
1948	Capital of Odisha shifted from Cuttack to Bhubaneswar
1952	The first Kalinga Prize awarded
1953	Completion of the Hirakud Dam
1956	University College of Engineering, was established in Burla
1957	Odisha Sahitya Academy was established
12 February 1961	The building of Legislative Assembly of Odisha was inaugurated

On 27 May 1947, Harekrushna Mahatab took oath to form a Congress ministry. In 1946, it was decided that Bhubaneswar would replace Cuttack as the political capital of the state of Odisha. A year after India gained its independence from Britain, the task of designing had been granted to the German architect Otto Königsberger. Also in 1948, construction on the Hirakud Dam began. By 1949, the 24 princely states had been integrated and Odisha had 13 districts: Cuttack, Puri, Balasore, Ganjam, Koraput, Sambalpur, Dhenkanal, Sundergarh, Keonjhar, Balangirpatna, Boudh-Kandhamal, Mayurbhanj and Kalahandi. On 12 May 1950, Mahatab resigned to join the Cabinet of India. Nabakrushna Choudhuri took over as the Chief Minister the same day.

In 1951, Biju Pattnaik made a donation to the UNESCO to establish the Kalinga Prize. It has been awarded every year since 1952 to people who have contributed to the popularization of science. On 12 February 1952, Nabakrushna Choudhuri took oath as the Chief Minister after the 1951 Assembly polls. In 1953, the 66 meters high and 25.4 km long Hirakud Dam was completed. In 1953, the Rourkela Steel Plant was planned to be built in collaboration with a West German consortium. On 19 October 1956, Nabakrushna Choudhuri resigned and Mahatab became the Chief Minister. In 1956, the first technical degree institution in the region, University College of Engineering, was established in Burla (presently it is known as Veer Surendra Sai University of Technology). In 1957, the Odisha Sahitya Academy was established to develop and promote Odia language and literature. On 13 January 1957, Prime Minister Jawaharlal Nehru officially inaugurated the Hirakud Dam. The 1957 Assembly polls were also won by the Congress party and on 6 April 1957 Harekrushna Mahatab took oath as the Chief Minister. On 22 May 1959, a coalition of Congress and Gantantra Parishad formed the government. On 21 February 1961, the coalition collapsed. On 25 February, President's rule was imposed on the state.

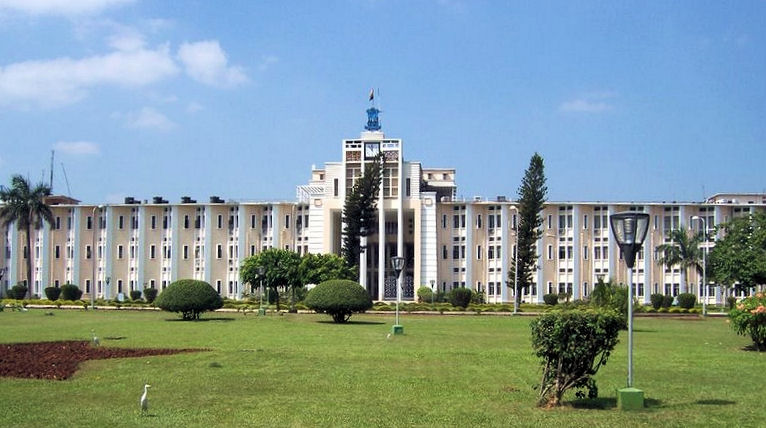
Legislative Assembly of Odisha building was inaugurated in 1961

On 12 February 1961, the new building of the Legislative Assembly of Odisha was inaugurated by Sarvepalli Radhakrishnan then vice-president of India. On 15 August 1961, the Regional Engineering College, Rourkela was founded. The mid-term polls were held in 1961 and Biju Pattnaik formed a ministry on 23 June 1961. On 3 January 1962, the foundation stone of the Paradip Port was laid by Prime Minister Nehru. On 18 April 1966, it was declared the 8th major port of India. Also in 1962, the Balimela Reservoir project was started. In August 1963, the Kamaraj Plan was formulated and Biju Patnaik was among the Chief Ministers to resign. After him, Biren Mitra became the Chief Minister. In April 1964, a Hindustan Aeronautics Limited plant was set up in Sunabeda to manufacture Tumansky R-11 F2 engines for MIG-21 FLs. In 1966, Mahatab left Indian National Congress to form a new party called the Jana Congress. After the 1967 Assembly polls, Rajendra Narayan Singh Deo became the Chief Minister of a coalition government consisting of the Swatantra Party and the Orissa Jana Congress.

In 1971 Assembly poll, the government was formed by a coalition of Utkal Congress, Swatantra Party and All India Jharkhand Party, with Bishwanath Das as the Chief Minister. On 14 June 1972, Nandini Satpathy became the Chief Minister of Odisha, heading a Congress ministry. On 1 March 1973, Chief Minister Nandini Satpathy resigned. In February 1974, mid-term polls were held. On 6 March 1974, Nandini Satpathy formed her second ministry. On 19 December 1976, Nandini Satpathy resigned again. She was replaced by Binayak Acharya who remained in office for 4 months. In 1977, Nilamani Routray became the Chief Minister after the Assembly poll, and Janata Party remained in power until 1980. The 1980 Assembly poll resulted in Janaki Ballabh Patnaik, of Indian National Congress, as the Chief Minister.

In 1981, NALCO was founded with the collaboration of the Pechiney company of France. It was headquartered in Bhubaneswar. On 30 October 1984, Indira Gandhi was in Bhubaneswar giving a speech. The next day she was assassinated. In 1985, Janaki Ballabh Patnaik was re-elected as the Chief Minister. Sachidananda Routray, Odia poet and novelist, received the Jnanpith Award for his contributions to modern Odia poetry. On 22 May 1989, the Agni-I was tested fired at Chandipur. On 6 December 1989, Janaki Ballabh Patnaik resigned as the Chief Minister and on 7 December Hemananda Biswal was sworn in. On 16 December 1989, Rabi Ray becomes the Speaker of Lok Sabha and he held the position until 9 July 1991.

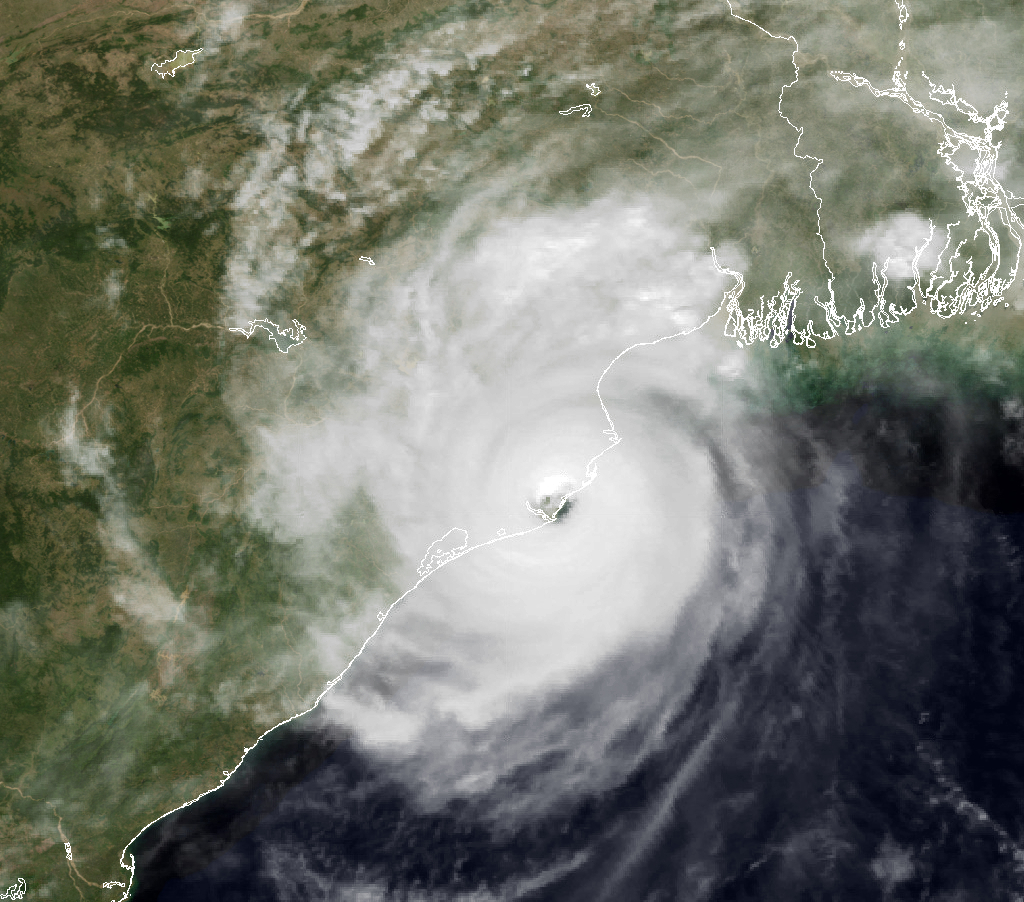
1999 Odisha cyclone making landfall

In 1990, Ranganath Misra became the 21st Chief Justice of India. In 1990, the Assembly polls were won by the Janata Dal and a government was formed under the leader of Biju Patnaik. In 1992, four new districts were created, Gajapati, Malkangiri, Rayagada and Nabarangpur. In 1993, 10 more districts were created, Khurda, Nayagarh, Sonepur, Bargarh, Kendrapara, Jagatsinghpur, Jajpur, Nuapada, Angul and Bhadrak. In 1994, three more were carved out, Jharsuguda, Deogarh and Boudh. This brought the number of districts in Odisha to 30. In 1993, Ranganath Misra became the first chairman of the National Human Rights Commission of India. The 1995 Assembly polls were won by the Indian National Congress and Janaki Ballabh Patnaik became the Chief Minister. On 22 January 1999, Australian missionary Graham Staines and his two sons were murdered. Staines was an Australian Christian missionary who, along with his two sons Philip (aged 10) and Timothy (aged 6), was burnt to death by a gang while sleeping in his station wagon at Manoharpur village in Keonjhar district in Odisha, India on 23 January 1999. In 2003, a Bajrang Dal activist, Dara Singh, was convicted of leading the gang that murdered Graham Staines and his sons, and was sentenced to life in prison. Soon afterwards, Janaki Ballabh Patnaik resigned and was replaced by Giridhar Gamang. In October 1999, a cyclone struck Odisha causing economic loss estimated at $2.5 billion (1999 USD) and about 10,000 deaths. In December 1999, Gamang also resigned. He was replaced by Hemananda Biswal on 7 December. In March 2000, Naveen Patnaik became the Chief Minister of a BJD-BJP alliance government who went ahead to serve for 24 years.

On 20 February 2014, the Odia language was given the status of a classical language of India, making it the sixth language to have the status. The Assembly Election 2024 was won by BJP and Mohan Charan Majhi became the Chief Minister of the state.Along with Pravati Parida and Kanak Bardhan Singh Deo as deputy CM of odisha.

== See also ==
- Historic sites in Odisha
- Maritime history of Odisha
- List of rulers of Odisha
