= Bali (Lunar dynasty) =

Ancient ruler of Lunar Anu dynasty

- Region: Anava

Genealogy
- Parents: Satapas (father), Prishni (mother)
- Spouse: Sudeshna
- Children: Aṅga, Vaṅga, Kaliṅga, Pauṇḍra, and Suhma (de jure)
- Dynasty: Chandravamsha

Bali (Sanskrit: बलि, romanized: Bali) is a king featured in Hindu literature. He is described to be the son of Sutapas and his wife Prishni. He rules a region named Anava, an eastern country as a member of the Chandravamsha (Lunar dynasty).

== Legend ==
Bali marries Sudeshna. The Harivamsha states that he performs a penance to appease Brahma, who promises him that he would become a great sage and will live till the end of the age. The deity also blesses him with great knowledge, the love of his subjects, invincibility in battle, and tells him that he would reestablish the varna system in his land.

One day, Bali saw the blind sage Dirghatamas clinging to a raft, and floating on the river Ganges. After his rescue, the sage told him that his own wife and sons had performed the deed due to the fact that he had been unable to support them. The king summoned his wife Sudeshna, and asked her to produce sons from him. Sudeshna, detesting the idea, decided to send her maid Dhatreyi, a Shudra woman, to lay with the sage. Eleven babies were born, and the sage soon learnt that the mother of his children was not the queen, but her servant maid. Bali pacified the sage's anger, and this time Dirghatamas and Sudeshna lay together to produce five sons. In other accounts, the mere touch of the sage caused Sudeshna's pregnancy. After renouncing all worldly affairs, he divided his country into five kingdoms, one for each of his sons:

- Anga (founder of the Anga kingdom)
- Vanga (founder of the Vanga kingdom)
- Kalinga (founder of the Kalinga kingdom)
- Pundra (founder of the Pundra kingdom)
- Suhma (founder of the Suhma kingdom)

== See also ==
- Pratardana
- Yayati
- Pratipa
- Lunar dynasty
