= Dirghatamas =

Hindu sage

In-universe information
- Family: Utathya (Father), Mamata (Mother), Brihaspati (uncle), Angiras (Grandfather)
- Spouse: Pradveshi
- Children: Gautama and others (Pradveshi), Kakshivan and eleven sons (Shudra servant woman) and Anga, Vanga, Kalinga, Pundra, Cumbha (Sudeshna), Odra

Dirghatamas (Sanskrit: दीर्घतमस्, romanized: Dīrghatamas) was an ancient Indian sage well known for his philosophical verses in the Rigveda. He was the author of Suktas (hymns) 140 to 164 in the first mandala (section) of the Rigveda.

== Background ==
Dirghatamas was one of the Angirasa rishis, the oldest of the rishi families, and regarded as brother to the rishi Bharadvaja, who is the seer of the sixth Mandala of the Rigveda. Dirghatamas is also the chief predecessor of the Gotama family of rishis that includes Kakshivan, Gautama Maharishi, Nodhas and Vamadeva (seer of the fourth Mandala of the Rigveda), who along with Dirghatamas account for almost 150 of the 1000 hymns of the Rigveda. Anga, Vanga, Kalinga, Pundra and Suhma, Ondra were also the sons of Dirghatamas through Bali’s wife Sudhesana. His own verses occur frequently in many Vedic texts, a few even in the Upanishads.

He was the reputed purohita or chief priest of King Bharata (Aitareya Brahmana VIII.23), one of the earliest kings of the land, after whom India was named as Bharata (the traditional name of the country).

== Legend ==
=== Background and birth ===
Brahma's son Angiras had two sons, Utathya and Brhaspati. Utathya married Mamata, and they are the parents of Dirghatamas. Bhishma tells the narrative of the birth of Dirghatama in the Mahabharata (Book 1, Adi Parva, CIV). One day, Bruhaspati approached Mamata when she was pregnant. She declined his sexual advances, explaining that the child in her womb, who is already knowledgeable in the Vedas and Vedangas, could not coexist with a second, equally powerful seed. Bruhaspati, undeterred by his sister in law's logic, attempted to impregnate her. When his semen entered the womb, the fetus already inside cried out to Bruhaspati to withdraw the semen, as there is not room for another child. When Bruhaspati again paid no heed, the fetus stomped out the semen himself, and it fell out onto the ground. Bruhaspati, angered by what he perceived as an insult, cursed the child to be born blind. Thus, the son was named "Dirghatamas" ("one for whom darkness is constant").

=== Marriage and children ===
Dirghatamas married a brahmin woman named Pradveshi. The couple had had several children, the eldest being Gautama Dirghatamas. However, his children grew up to be unethical and greedy, ruining their father's reputation as a respectable sage. Eventually, the community of sages and students abandoned Dirghatamas.

Dirgatamas, dejected by his family's reputation, sought consolation from his wife, Pradveshi. However, Pradveshi also harbored disdain for Dirghatamas, saying that he was not a real husband, neither a protector (Pati) nor a supporter (Bhartri), and she had had to raise the children all alone.

Dirghatamas, wounded by her sentiments, responded by angrily establishing a new rule of dharma: a woman should only marry once in life, regardless of whether her husband is alive or dead. Enraged, Pradveshi asked her sons to throw their father into the Ganga River. Gautama and his brother tied Dirghatamas to a raft and threw him into the water.

Dirghatamas floated downstream until he was rescued by King Bali, who happened to be performing ritual ablutions in the holy river at the time. Out of gratitude, the sage granted a boon to King Bali.

The king asked Dirghatamas to engage in niyoga so that Queen Sudeshna might be able to have children. Dirghatamas assented.

The Queen sent the blind sage a woman of low birth instead, however, and with that woman Dirghatamas sired Kakshivan and ten more sons.

Later, Dirghatamas came to learn that he had been deceived, but Bali ultimately prevailed upon Queen Sudeshna to sire by the sage six sons, bequeathing them their namesake kingdoms of Anga, Vanga, Kalinga, Pundra, Suhma, and Odra.

== Significance ==
=== Asya Vamasya Hymn ===
Dirghatamas is famous for his paradoxical apothegms. His mantras are enigmas: "He who knows the father below by what is above, and he who knows the father who is above by what is below is called the poet."

The Asya Vamasya (Rigveda 1.164) is one of the sage's most famous poems. Early scholars (such as Deussen in his Philosophy of the Upanishads) tried to say that the poems of Dirghatamas were of a later nature because of their content, but this has no linguistic support which has been argued by modern Sanskrit scholars (such as Dr. C. Kunhan Raja in his translation of the Asya Vamasya Hymn). The reason that earlier Western scholars believed them to be of a later origin is due to the monist views found there. They believed that early Vedic religion was pantheistic and a monist view of god evolved later in the Upanishads—but the poems of Dirghatamas (1.164.46) which say "there is One Being (Ekam Sat) which is called by many names" proves this idea incorrect.

=== Earliest mention of the Zodiac ===
Some scholars have claimed that the Babylonians invented the zodiac of 360 degrees around 700 BCE, perhaps even earlier, as old as the Rigveda, the oldest Vedic text, there are clear references to a chakra or wheel of 360 spokes placed in the sky. The number 360 and its related numbers like 12, 24, 36, 48, 60, 72, 108, 432 and 720 occur commonly in Vedic symbolism. It is in the hymns of the rishi Dirghatamas (RV I.140–164) that we have the clearest such references.

== See also ==
- List of Indian philosophers
- Rigveda
