= Rajapura =

Major city and palace in ancient India

Rajapura was a term used in the Mahabharata to describe either a major city of the Kalingas or the royal palace of the Kalinga in the city Rajahmandry, believed to be the capital of the Kalingas. Rajapura has also been listed as one of the capitals Kalinga king Chitrāngada, specifically the site where the emperor Ashoka attended a bride selection ceremony.
