= Odra kingdom =

Ancient Indian kingdom

Odra (Sanskrit: ओड्र, was a kingdom located in the northern Odisha in Eastern India. This kingdom was mentioned in the epic Mahabharata. Odras were neighbours to the Vangas. It is believed that the Odia language and the state Odisha got their names derived from the name "Odra".

== Reference in Mahabharata ==
Only a single reference of Odra is found in Mahabharata. The Odras were mentioned along with the Vangas, Angas and Paundras as bringing tribute for Yudhishthira for his Rajasuya sacrifice (3,51). There is a mysterious mention of the name Udrakeralas in Mahabharata. It is not known if the word Udra in the composite word Udra-Keralas has any relations with Odra. The name Oriya originated from Odra. The Bhagbata Purana mentions Odra, among the six sons of Dirghatamas by queen Sudesna with the Pundrakas, Dravidas, Kambojas, Sakas, Yavanas etc. Pliny placed Oretes near mountain Mallus which can be identified with Malayagiri near Pallahara in the present Angul district. Prof B.C Majumdar observs ".. the hilly country lying between Kalinga and Dakshina Kosala was the Odra land." R.D Banerji calls the Odras as the people of Northern Orissa. In the early medieval period, Odra became a distinct territorial division. The earliest reference to Odra in this period is gleaned from the Soro Copper Plates of Somadatta. It mentions the northern Tosali was a part of Odravisaya. By that time, Northern Tosali was a fairly extensive territory comprising Midnapur and undivided Balasore district and a considerable portion of Mayurbhanj and undivided Cuttack districts. Its inclusion in Odra indicates that the latter was a vast region between river Suvarnarekha in the north & Vaitarani in the south.

== Odas as a tribal group ==
The Quarterly Journal of the Andhra Historical Research Society (1927) identifies the Odas as a tribe inhabiting the Sambalpur tracts of Kalinga, equating them with the Sanskrit term Udras. The journal records that the Kosala kings, having moved from Sripur to the Sambalpur region, "came out with their Oda legions" to seize the Tooth Relic of the Buddha — an event of major religious and political significance in early medieval India. Following this, the presiding deity of Puri came to be known as Odisa, interpreted as "the Lord of the Odas", around whom developed the kingdom of Kalingoda or Kangoda.

Odra finds mention in Hiuen Tsang's Si-Yu-Ki where he describes it as Wu-Cha which was 1400 miles in circuit. Other historians opine that Odra comprised undivided Midnapur, Balasore, Cuttack, Ganjam & Puri districts. However, the present day research excludes the possibility of the inclusion of Puri in Odra. It is only because Che-li-ta-Lo, a port mentioned by Hieun Tsang and its location at Puri by Cunningham and others have been challenged by scholars who locate it either in Tirtol (Jagatsinghpur district), Chandabali (Bhadrak district) or Manikapatana (on the bank of Chilika lake in Puri district).

As noticed, Odra, Utkala, Kalinga, Kongoda, Tosali & Kosala were territories having distinct boundaries of their own and the boundary changed from time to time in ancient and early medieval days. Sometimes it is noticed that some of these names were used as interchangeable terms, e.g. Odra was known as Tosali during Bhauma-karas. At the advent of the fifteenth century AD, poet Sarala Dasa made Udisa as Orissa synonymous with Odra Rastra, which became Odisha Rajya during the Gajapatis. Right from the days of Kapilendradeva (1435–1467 AD), this empire land of the Odia-speaking people has been known as Odisha.

== Probable descendants ==
Early ethnographic and historical accounts suggest that the Odra tribal identity survived into the historical period through communities known as the Oda Chasa and Oda Khandayat of Odisha. James Peggs, a Baptist missionary stationed in Cuttack in the nineteenth century, recorded that the designation Or or Odra was applied par excellence to the class of husbandmen known as Or Chasa, and that those of this tribe performing martial duties were designated Or Paik and Or Khandait.

Gopabandhu Rath, in his linguistic study of western Odisha, states that "the pure descendants of the Odras are still living in the natural Orissa by the name of Odde, Odiya and Oda-Chasa."

Dhirendranath Patnaik, writing on the history of Odisha in the context of Odissi dance, identifies the Oda-Chasa explicitly as "Odra cultivator" and the Oda-Paika as "Odra infantry", noting that from the Gajapati period (16th century onwards), Odras who settled in areas surrounding the capital came to be known by these two designations.

Ashutosh Prasad Patnaik observed that unlike communities of Naga or Aryan origin which fragmented into numerous castes, the Odras are encountered in the historical record as members of a single community subdivided into two occupational designations — Oda Chasa (cultivator) and Oda Khandayat (wielder of sword) — suggesting that the Odras entered the region as an ethnically cohesive group at a time when the caste system was already established.

Oad Rajputs: The Tale of a Legendary Migration

Long ago, the story of the Oad Rajputs began with a grand Suryavanshi royal lineage traced back to legendary kings like Sagara and Bhagiratha, eventually leading to King Oad, who founded the historical Odra Kingdom in modern-day Odisha. For generations, the kingdom flourished, but its destiny took a dramatic turn in the early 11th century when a massive Chola invasion led by Emperor Rajendra Chola I swept through the region—a fierce conflict recorded in the Tiruvalangadu Copper Plates (v. 120), which describes the tragic fall of the Odda king and his army.

Determined to protect their honor, faith, and freedom after the defeat, an estimated 900,000 members of the community left their homeland in a westward migration. Journeying across India, they finally settled in Rajasthan (Mewar and Marwar), Gujarat, Malwa, Punjab, and Sindh. Along the way, they added engineering skills to their warrior heritage, and built large stone forts, stepwells, and water reservoirs across the desert lands. Their contributions to public service and craftsmanship was documented by Anupam Mishra in Aaj Bhi Khare Hain Talaab, while British historian James Tod discussed their contributions in Annals and Antiquities of Rajasthan, including references to chieftains like Samant Jassu Oad, who is credited with building the famous Gomti Talaab (historically called Jassu Oad Ka Talaab) in Jhalrapata, Jhalawar district, Rajasthan.
