= Kalinga (Mahabharata) =

Kingdom described in the Mahabharata

South Asia circa 500 BCE, with location of Kalinga

Kalinga, is a kingdom described in the legendary Indian text Mahabharata. They were a warrior clan who settled in and around the historical Kalinga region, present-day Odisha and northern parts of Andhra Pradesh. According to some scholars, the Kalinga janapada originally comprised the area covered by the Puri and Ganjam districts.

Kalinga clan warriors sided with Duryodhana in the Kurukshetra War due to matrimonial and harmony alliances between both kingdoms of Kalinga & Kuru existing even before the Great War of Mahabharata was to happen. Kalinga are the founders of five eastern kingdoms, which included: Angas (east, central Bihar), Vangas (southern West Bengal and Bangladesh), Odra (northern Odisha), Pundras (northern Bangladesh and West Bengal, India), Suhmas (south-western West Bengal, India) shared common ancestry. Two capitals (Dantapura and Rajapura) of Kalinga were mentioned in Mahabharata. It is likely that there were many Kalinga kings, ruling different territories of Kalinga, with many migrated outside to form the new kingdom.

== Kalingas in Kurukshetra War ==
Kalingas were mentioned as allied to Kauravas at many places like at (5–62,95). Kalinga king Srutayudha also known as Srutayus and Srutayush, was one among the generals in the Kaurava army.(6,16). The generals of Kaurava army were:

- Shakuni, a chief from Gandhara kingdom
- Shalya, the king of Madra kingdom
- Jayadratha, the king of Sindhu kingdom
- Vinda and Anuvinda, two brothers and kings of Avanti kingdom
- The Kekaya brothers from Kekeya kingdom (opposed the Kekayas on the Pandava side)
- Sudakshina, the king of Kamboja kingdom
- Srutayudha, the king of Kalinga Kingdom
- Jayatsena, a king of Magadha kingdom
- Vrihadvala, the king of Kosala kingdom
- Kritavarma, a Yadava chief from Anarta kingdom

== Other references ==
- A Kalinga princess named Karambha was wedded to Akrodhana a Puru king. Devatithi was their son. (1,95)
- An ally of Karitkeya, generalissimo of Deva army is mentioned as Kalinga (9,45)

== See also ==
- Kingdoms of Ancient India
