= Kosal Horizon =

Western Odisha's English weekly

Kosal Horizon was an English-language weekly published from Rourkela, in Odisha, Sundergarh district, India. Its main focus is the recent happenings in the Western Odisha (claimed as Kosal) area of India. In addition it publishes news of national and international events. The editor of the publication as per the Registrar General of India is Baidyanath Mishra. It was registered as a newspaper in 2012.
