= Pundravardhana =

Ancient Indian kingdom

Coordinates: 24.96°N 89.35°E

- unknown (?~1280 BCE)–unknown (?~300 BCE)
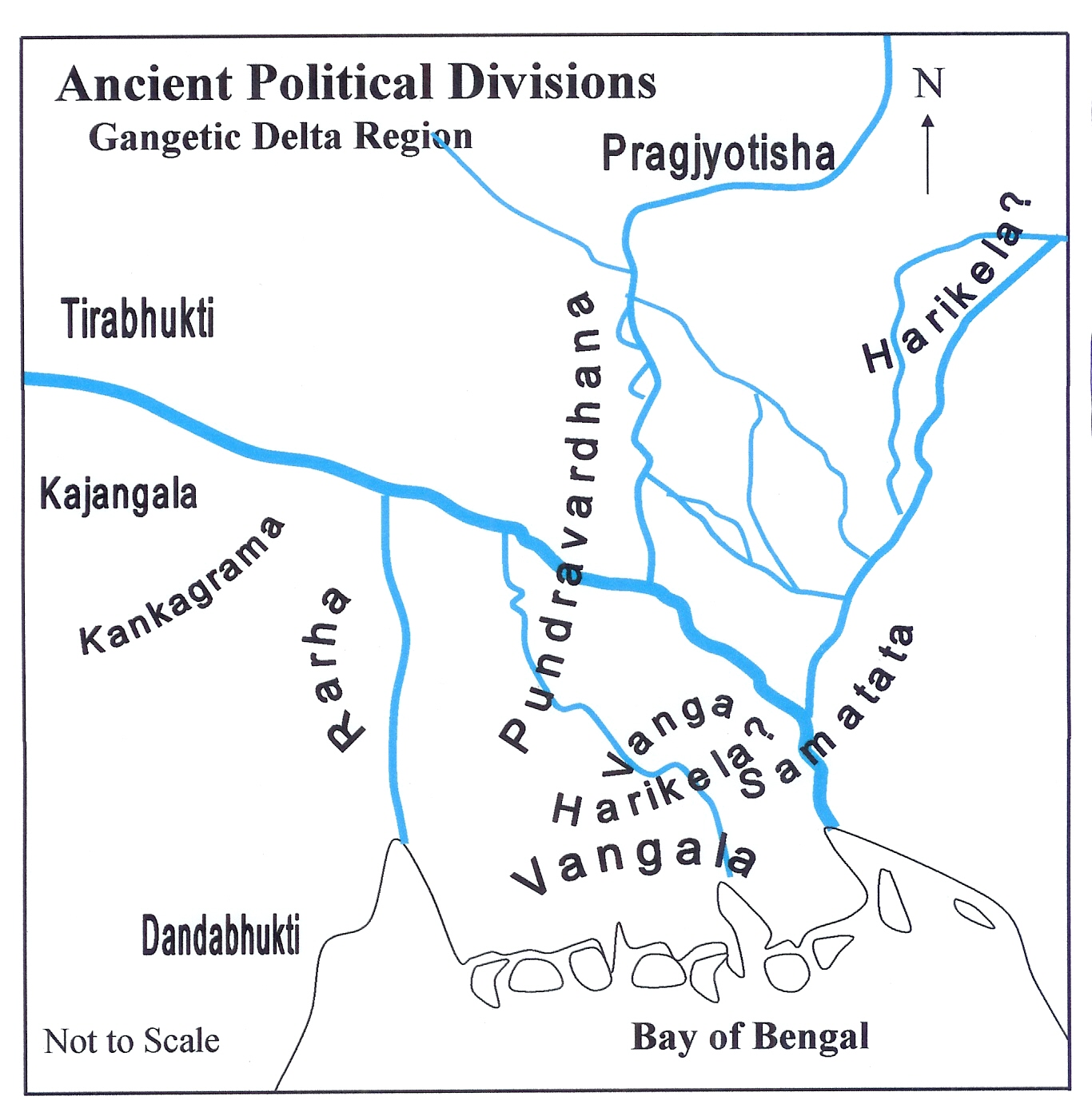
- Capital: Pundranagara; Kotivarsha (administratitive centre of vishaya or division)
- Common languages: Sanskrit, Pali, Prakrit
- Religion: Historical Vedic religion Jainism; Buddhism
- Government: Monarchy
- Historical era: Bronze Age; Iron Age
  - Established: unknown (?~1280 BCE)
  - Disestablished: unknown (?~300 BCE)
- Today part of: Bangladesh; India (West Dinajpur district, West Bengal)

Pundravardhana or Pundra kingdom (Sanskrit: Puṇḍravardhana) was an ancient kingdom of Iron Age India located in the Bengal region of the Indian subcontinent with a territory that included parts of present-day Rajshahi and parts of Rangpur Division of Bangladesh, as well as the West Dinajpur district of West Bengal, India. The capital of the kingdom, then known as Pundranagara (Pundra city), was located at Mahasthangarh in Bogra District of northern Bangladesh.

== Geography ==
Mahasthangarh, the ancient capital of Pundravardhana is located 11 km (7 mi) north of Bogra on the Bogra-Rangpur highway, with a feeder road (running along the eastern side of the ramparts of the citadel for 1.5 km) leading to Jahajghata and site museum.

== Mentions in mythological literature ==
=== Domestic life of Bali ===
According to the Mahabharata (I.104.53–54) and puranic literature, Pundra was named after Prince Pundra, the founder of the kingdom, and the son of King Bali. Bali who had no children, requested the sage, Dirghatamas, to bless him with sons. The sage is said to have begotten five sons through his wife, the queen Sudesna. The princes were named Anga, Vanga, Kalinga, Pundra and Sumha.

=== Kurukshetra War and aftermath ===
According to Mahabharata's Sabha Parva (Book II, Chapter 27), The Pundra Kingdom were recorded as participants in the Kurukshetra War and were fighting on the side of Kauravas. But they were defeated by the Kuru Kingdom under Pandu. However, instead of being consumed by the Kurus after the war, it remained self-governed until Arjun's post-war military campaign against various dynasties which included it.

The kingdom dissolved around 300 BCE. The land was later conquered by Nanda Empire between 345 BCE to 340 BCE. After the collapse of Nanda Empire ( predecessor of Mauryans), Pundra remained in control during the Mauryan period (successor of Nanda Empire). According to 5th century legendary text Ashokavadana, the Mauryan emperor Ashoka issued an order to kill all the Ajivikas (follower of nāstika or "heterodox" schools of Indian philosophy) in Pundravardhana after a non-Buddhist there drew a picture showing the Gautama Buddha bowing at the feet of Nirgrantha Jnatiputra(Mahavira). Around 18,000 followers of the Ajivika sect were said to have been executed as a result of this order. According to K. T. S. Sarao and Benimadhab Barua, stories of persecutions of rival sects by Ashoka appear to be a clear fabrication arising out of sectarian propaganda. Ashoka's own inscriptions Barabar Caves record his generous donations and patronage to Ajivikas.

== History ==
=== Establishment ===
At first, Pundra Kingdom was usually known as only 'Pundra'. The exact time when the Pundra kingdom was established has not been determined accurately even today. However, one of the first states that the Vedic people saw established in India after their arrival was "Pundra". The first mention of the Pundra kingdom and the Pundras is found in the Aita Brahmana. There, "Pundras" of ancient India are described as a non-aryan race and are mentioned as brothers of the Andhras, Shavars, Pulindas and Mutivas. However, King Vali's sons were thought as both of a mix of Non-Aryan and Aryan race, especially Pundra .

=== Naming ===
There are several theories about the origin of the name Pundra. According to one theory, the name Pundra is derived from Panduroga . Most of the people of Pundrakshetra (Pundrabhumi) suffered from this disease. According to another theory, Pundra is a type of sugarcane. And where sugarcane was starting to grow in abundance, it was named and known as Pundradesh or Pundrabhumi. According to the Vedic texts found in the 7th-8th century BCE, the Pundra were a non-Aryan tribe who lived east of the Gandaki River . The Mahabharata of the 1st century CE also supports this information. It was said the land where the "Pundras" lived was called Pundra.

== Culture ==
The oldest inscription of Bengal, the Mahasthangarh Brahmi inscription of Mauryan Bengal, inscribed in the 3rd century BCE, identifies the inhabitants of ancient Pundravardhana as "Samvangaiya". There debate which was the religion majority there but it is noted that Pundra had a pluralism society. Many claims that they were originally Buddhist or Jainism. Where others argue they were Hindus who mostly were devotees of Shiva and Vaishnava religions..A notable person from this area was the spiritual teacher of Chandragupta Maurya, Jain Ācārya Bhadrabahu, who was born in Pundravardhana to a Brahmin family.

The Chinese traveller, Hiuen Tsang, travelled to the Pundravardhana region in 639–45. He travelled from Kazangala to Pundravardhana via Kamapura. Xuanzang gave a clear a description of Buddhism there. The following quote about Pundravardhana:

"There were 20 Buddhist monasteries and more than 3000 monks who followed the "Mahayana and Hinayana" schools; the number of temples was 100 and the followers of various classes were spread out, the number of Digambara Nirgranthas was innumerable."

Meaning Pundra did have Jainism and Buddhist origins there.

== Discovery ==
Several personalities contributed to the discovery and identification of the ruins at Mahasthangarh. F. Buchanan Hamilton was the first European to locate and visit Mahasthangarh in 1808, C. J. O'Donnell, E. V. Westmacott, and Baveridge followed. Alexander Cunningham was the first to identify the place as the capital of Pundravardhana. He visited the site in 1889.
