= Vanga kingdom =

Ancient kingdom in Bengal

Vaṅga
- c. 1100 BCE–c. 340 BCE
- Vanga and erstwhile neighbors among the Mahajanapadas
- Government: Monarchy
- Maharaja
  - c. 6th century BCE: Samudrasena
  - c. 3rd century BCE: Chadrasena
- Historical era: Iron Age
  - Established: c. 1100 BCE
  - Disestablished: c. 340 BCE
Preceded by	Succeeded by
Vedic Period	Nanda Empire; Samatata
- Today part of: Bangladesh; India

Vaṅga was an ancient kingdom and geopolitical division within the Ganges Delta in the Indian subcontinent. The kingdom is one of the namesakes of the Bengal region. It was located in eastern and southern Bengal. Vanga features prominently in the epics and tales of ancient India as well as in the history of Sri Lanka.

There are numerous references to Vanga in the Hindu epic Mahabharata, which is one of the two major Sanskrit epics of India. The other epic, the Ramayana, mentions the kingdom as an ally of Ayodhya. The exact capital of ancient Vanga kingdom has not been identified. For the presence of continuous archeological proof from Pre-Mauryan to Pala-Sena period Chandraketugarh is considered as a major city of Vanga kingdom. According to ancient Jain texts, Tamralipta was the capital of Vanga kingdom.

After the rule of the Gupta Empire, ancient Bengal was divided into two independent kingdoms – Gauda and Vanga. Kotalipara, an ancient fortified city of independent Vanga kingdom, emerged as the centre of administration of Vanga kings after the Gupta period.

Vanga was probably the centre of the Gangaridai mentioned by numerous Greco-Roman writers. Indian and Greco-Roman writers referred to the region's war elephants. In Indian history, Vanga is notable for its strong navy.

== History ==
The Vanga kingdom emerged in the lower Ganges delta during the Northern Black Polished Ware Period. It controlled many of the islands of the delta with its naval fleet and embarked on overseas exploration. Ancient Indian records refer to Vanga as a hub of sailors. In the 5th century BCE, the Vanga king Sinhabahu's son prince Vijaya sailed across the Bay of Bengal and established a kingdom in what is now Sri Lanka. The religious traditions of the kingdom included Vedic Hinduism, Jainism and Buddhism.

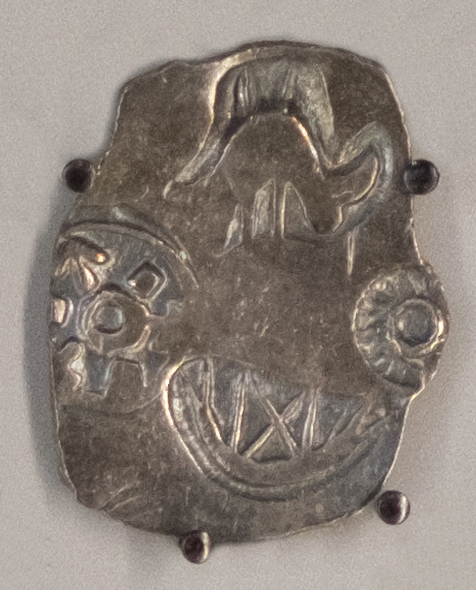
Vanga coin (400-300 BCE)

Vanga is recorded as an administrative unit in the Arthashastra written by Kautilya. It is described as a notable naval power by Kalidasa. There are also records of subdivisions within Vanga, including "Upa Vanga" (minor Vanga) which corresponds to Jessore and forested areas corresponding to the Sundarbans and "Anuttara Vanga" (southern Vanga), denoting present-day the area of Barisal.

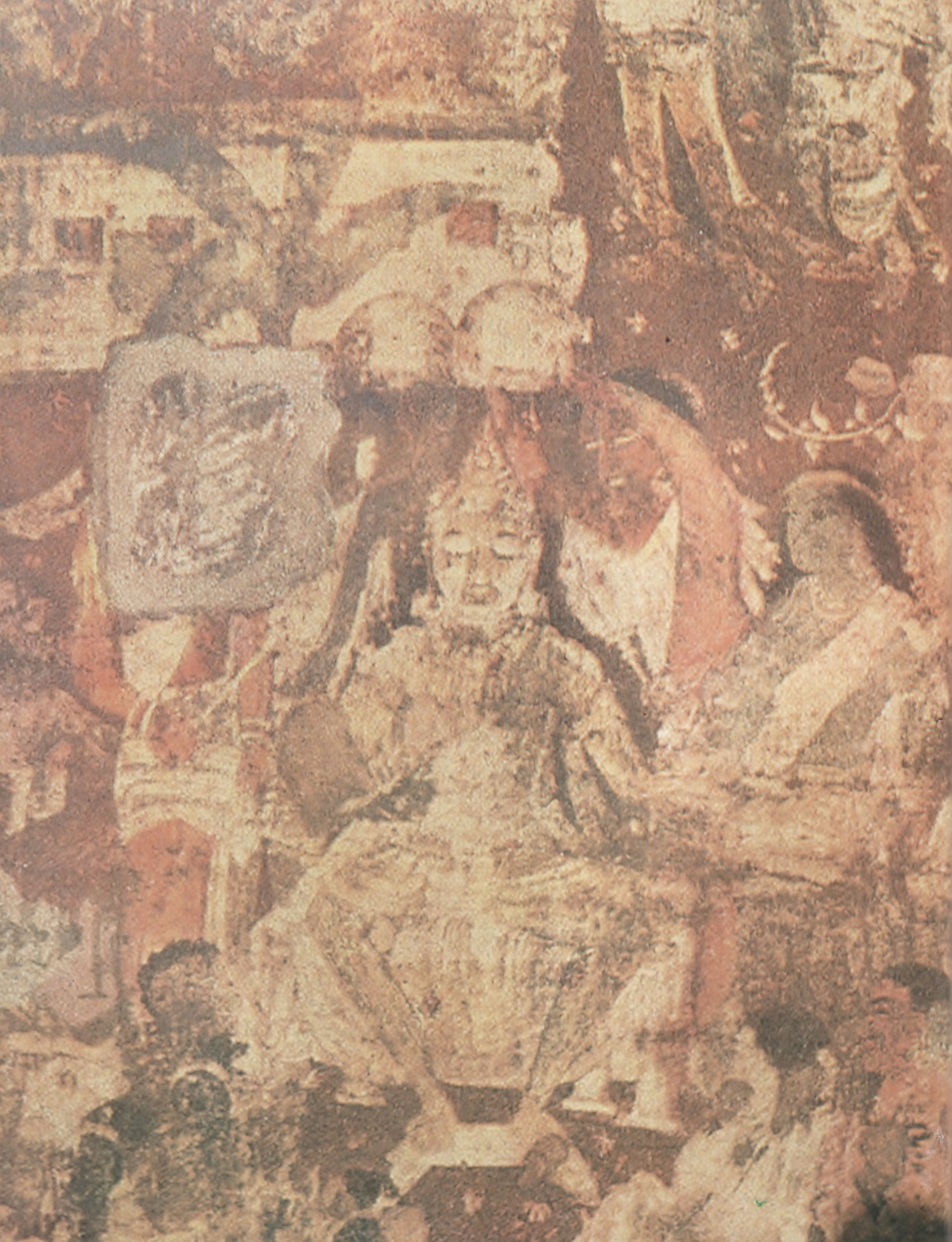
The coronation of Vanga prince Vijaya as king of Lanka island. Mural in the Ajanta Caves, western India

The rulers of the Vanga kingdom remain mostly unknown. After the 2nd century BCE, the territory became part of successive Indian empires, including Mauryans, Guptas, Shashanka's reign, Khadgas, Palas, Chandras, Senas and Devas. The term Vangala was often used to refer to the territory. For example, an inscription of the South Indian Chola dynasty referred to the region as Vangaladesha during a war with the Chandra dynasty of eastern Bengal. After the Muslim conquest of Bengal, the region was referred to as Bangalah, which may have evolved from ancient name Vangala. The names are the precursors of the modern terms Banga and Bangla.

== Prince Vijaya ==
Prince Vijaya was made the prince regent by his father, but he and his band of followers became notorious for their violent deeds. After their repeated complaints failed to stop him, prominent citizens demanded that Vijaya be put to death. King Sinhabahu then expelled Vijaya and his 700 followers from the kingdom. Prince Vijaya landed on the island of Lanka, present day Sri Lanka and established the Kingdom of Tambapanni. Prince Vijaya's dynasty (House of Vijaya) would later go on to rule the Kingdom of Anuradhapura and Sri Lanka for around 500 years.

Prince Vijaya's party of several hundred landed in Sri Lanka, were split on the journey. The men, women and children were on separate ships. Vijaya and his followers landed at a place called Supparaka; the women landed at a place called Mahiladipaka present day (Maldives), and the children landed at a place called Naggadipa. Vijaya eventually made it to the island of Lanka.

== Settlements ==
The Vanga Kingdom was known for its superior naval fleets and naval supremacy. According to the Mahabarata the Vanga Kingdom also colonised territory outside of mainland India. This can be observed with the supposed Vanga settlements in the island of Mahiladipaka in the Maldives and Prince Vijaya's conquests of Lanka.

There has also been instances of Vanga settlements in Southeast Asia. Most notably in Champa (Vietnam), where a settlement was founded in Cochinchina. The settlement was named after a native Bengali name.

== Geography ==
The core region of Vanga lay between the Padma-Meghna river system in the east and the Bhagirathi-Hooghly river system in the west. In the east, it encompassed the modern Bangladeshi Khulna Division excluding pre-1947 Jessore District i.e. Upa Vanga which is in Paschim (West) Vanga and Barisal division as well as the Dhaka division. Vanga also included the eastern area of Old Brahmaputra, denoting present-day Sylhet Division and eastern Mymensingh Division of Bangladesh. In the west, it included Presidency division of West Bengal and may have extended to Burdwan division and Medinipur division. Its neighbors included Pundravardhana in the north; and Magadha, Anga and Suhma in the west.

The Vanga kingdom encompassed the many islands of the Ganges delta and the Sundarbans mangrove forest.

== Archaeology ==
Chandraketugarh, Tamralipta and Wari-Bateshwar ruins are the major archaeological sites of Vanga Kingdom.

== References in the Mahabharata ==
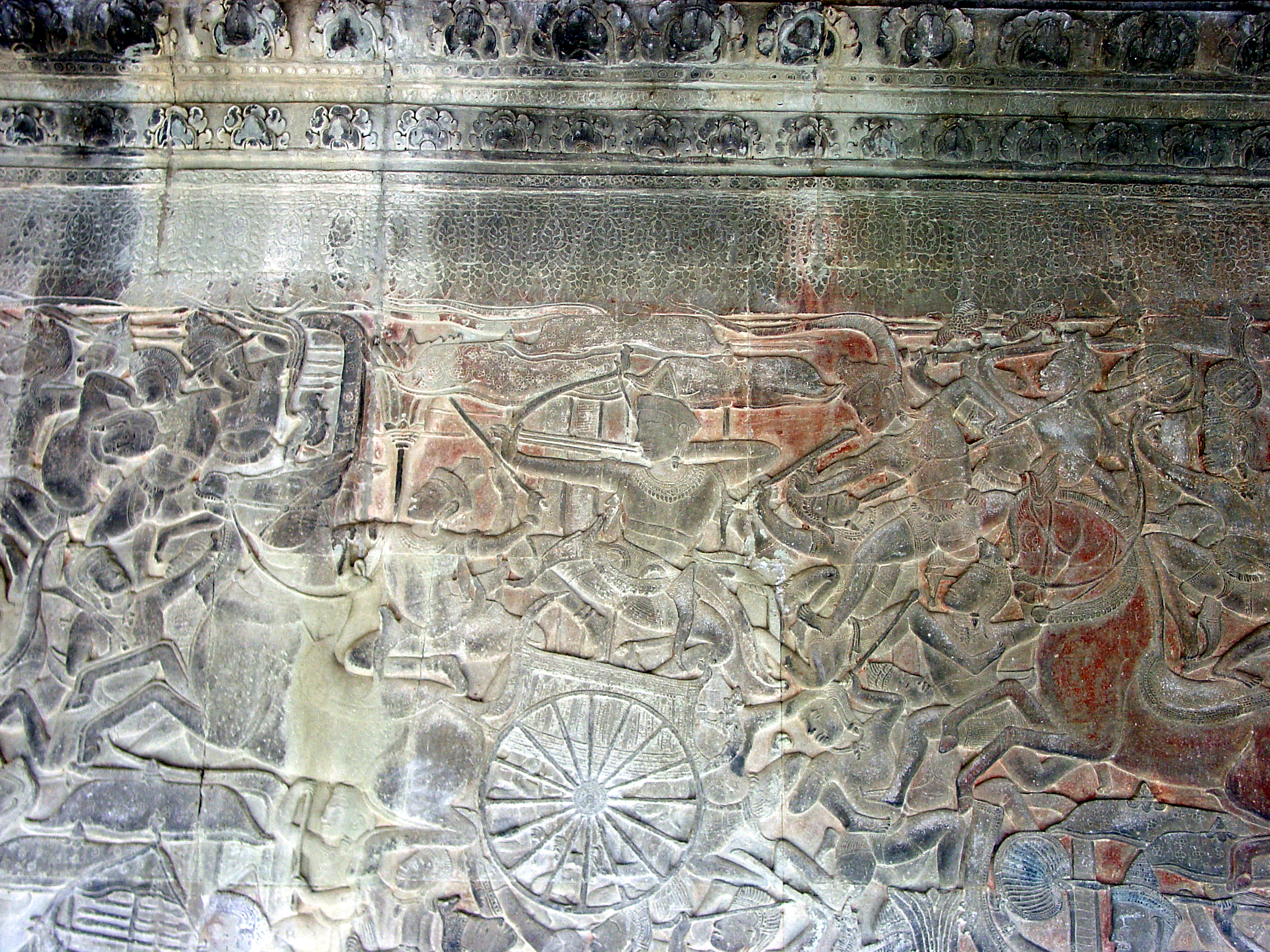
Scenes from the Kurukshetra War of the Mahabharata shown in Angkor Wat, Cambodia

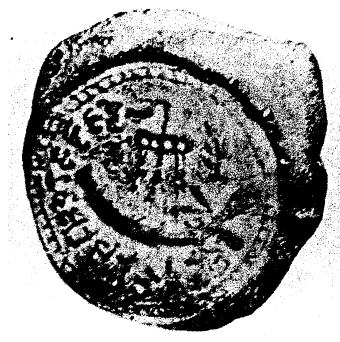
Terracotta seal of a ship found in Chandraketugarh, West Bengal, India

At (6:9), Anga, Vanga, and Kalinga were mentioned as close kingdoms in Bharata Varsha (Ancient India). All regions of sacred waters and all other holy palaces there were in Vanga and Kalinga, Arjuna visited all of them, during his pilgrimage lasting for 12 years throughout ancient India.

The founders of Angas, Vangas, Kalingas, Pundras and Suhmas shared a common ancestry. They were all adopted sons of a king named Vali (Bali), born by a sage named Gautama Dirghatamas, who lived in Magadha close to the city of Girivraja. Other texts say that, because king Bali had no descendants, this deputed rishi Dirghatamaas to give birth of the children through Niyoga and thus five sons were born from the womb of the wife of Bali.

=== Other expeditions to Vanga ===
The Kashmiras, the Daradas, the Kuntis, the Kshudrakas, the Malavas, the Angas, the Vangas, the Kalingas, the Videhas, the Tamraliptakas, the Rakshovahas, the Vitahotras, the Trigartas, the Martikavatas were all vanquished by Bhargava Rama (7:68).

Karna captured the Angas, and the Vangas, and the Kalingas, and the Mandikas, and the Magadhas. the Karkakhandas; and also included with them the Avasiras, Yodhyas, and the Ahikshatras (3:252).

The Angas, the Vangas, the Kalingas, the Magadhas, the Kasis, the Kosalas, the Vatsyas, the Gargyas, the Karushas and the Paundras were mentioned to be vanquished by Vasudeva Krishna (7:11).

Arjuna defeated the countries of the Vangas, the Pundras, and the Kosalas (14:82) in his military campaign after Kurukshetra War.

=== Tributes to Yudhishthira ===
The kings of Anga, Vanga and Pundra were mentioned as attending the court of Yudhishthira at (2:4). The Vangas, Angas, Paundras, Odras, Cholas, Dravidas and Andhrakas were mentioned to be giving tribute to Yudhishthira (3:51). The Angas, the Vangas, the Punras, the Sanavatyas, and the Gayas—these good and well-born Kshatriyas distributed into regular clans and trained to the use of arms, brought tribute unto king Yudhishthira by hundreds and thousands. The Vangas, the Kalingas, the Magadhas, the Tamraliptas, the Supundrakas, the Dauvalikas, the Sagarakas, the Patrornas, the Saisavas, and innumerable Karnapravaranas, were found waiting at the gate (2:51).

=== Vangas in Kurukshetra War ===
Vanga army was skilled in handling war elephants. They sided with the Kauravas.

Vangas sided with Duryodhana in the Kurukshetra War (8:17) along with the Kalingas. They are mentioned as part of the Kaurava army at (7:158). Many foremost of combatants skilled in elephant-fight, belonging to the Easterners, the Southerners, the Angas, the Vangas, the Pundras, the Magadhas, the Tamraliptakas, the Mekalas, the Koshalas, the Madras, the Dasharnas, the Nishadas united with the Kalingas (8:22). Satyaki, pierced the vitals of the elephant belonging to the king of the Vangas (8:22).

Bhagadatta was mentioned as the ruler of the Pragjyotisha kingdom that took part in the Kurukshetra War.

Behind Duryodhana proceeded the ruler of the Vangas, with ten thousand elephants, huge as hills, and each with juice trickling down (6:92). The ruler of the Vangas (Bhagadatta) mounting upon an elephant huge as a hill, drove towards the Rakshasa, Ghatotkacha. On the field of battle, with the mighty elephant of great speed, Bhagadatta placed himself in the very front of Duryodhana's car. With that elephant he completely shrouded the car of thy son. Beholding then the way (to Duryodhana's car) thus covered by the intelligent king of the Vangas, the eyes of Ghatotkacha became red in anger. He ruled that huge dart, before upraised, at that elephant. Struck with that dart hurled from the arms of Ghatotkacha, that elephant, covered with blood and in great agony, fell down and died. The mighty king of the Vangas, however, quickly jumping down from that elephant, alighted on the ground (6:93).

=== Rulers of Vanga ===
At (2:29) two rulers Samudrasena and Chadrasena were mentioned. It is not clear if they were rulers of Vanga kingdom. Karna is mentioned as the ruler of Anga and Vanga at (2:43). Paundraka Vasudeva, an ally of Jarasandha and enemy of Vasudeva Krishna is mentioned as king of Vanga, Pundra and the Kiratas at (2:14). Bhagadatta is mentioned as the ruler of Vanga at (8:22).

Probably all these rulers had a stake in the territory of Vanga. All of them were mentioned as ruling the neighbouring kingdoms of Vanga, in other passages in Mahabharata. Bhagadatta was the ruler of Pragjyotisha kingdom to the north of Vanga. Paundraka Vasudeva ruled Pundra kingdom to the east of Vanga and Karna ruled Anga kingdom to the west of Vanga.

=== Other references ===
Kings of Kalinga and Vanga were mentioned as attending the self choice ceremony of the Panchala princess, along with Vasudeva the king of Pundra.

== See also ==
- Kingdoms of Ancient India
