= Suhma kingdom =

Ancient kingdom in Bengal

Suhma kingdom was an ancient kingdom during the Late Vedic period on the eastern part of the Indian subcontinent, which originated in the region of Bengal. The Capital of the kingdom was Tamralipta present day Tamluk. The kingdom included present day districts of undivided Midnapore (Tamralipta) and parts of Hoogly and Howrah of West Bengal. This kingdom was mentioned in the epic Mahabharata along with its neighbouring kingdom Prasuhma.

== References in Mahabharata ==
The founders of Angas, Vangas, Kalingas, Pundras and Suhmas shared a common ancestry. They were all adopted sons of a king named Vali, born by a sage named Gautama Dirghatamas, who lived in Magadha close to the city of Girivraja.

=== Military expeditions to Suhma ===
Pandu (the father of Pandavas) after defeating the Magadhas and the Videhas of Mithila, led his army against Kashi, Suhma, and Pundra, as well as by the strength and prowess of his arms spread the fame of the Kurus.

Arjuna, that bull amongst the son of Pandu, at the head of all his troops, fiercely attacked the regions called Suhma and Sumala during his military campaign to collect tribute to Yudhishthira's Rajasuya.

Bhima vanquished in battle the Suhmas and the Prasuhmas. The Pandava Bhima subjugated in battle those strong and brave heroes of fierce prowess. The heroic and mighty Vasudeva, the king of Pundra and king Mahaujah who reigned in Kausika-Kachchha, and then attacked the king of Vanga. Having vanquished Samudrasena and king Chandrasena and Tamralipta, and also the king of the Kaivartas and the ruler of the Suhmas, as also the kings that dwelt on the sea-shore, that bull among the Bharatas then conquered all Mleccha tribes. Karna also subjugated the Pundras and Suhmas.

The fourth canto of the epic poem Raghuvamsa, written by Kalidasa mentions that King Raghu of Ikshavaku Dynasty during his conquest in the East, he had defeated the Suhmas.In order to save their lives, they begged for his mercy. The then king (whose name is not mentioned in the Raghuvamsa) was ousted from his throne by King Raghu, but was later rethroned by him, when the king pleaded him and offered him with innumerable riches.

== See also ==
- Kingdoms of Ancient India
- History of Bengal

== Notes ==
- Mahabharata of Krishna Dwaipayana Vyasa, translated to English by Kisari Mohan Ganguli
