= Álvaro =

Álvaro or Álvar (Galician: [ˈalβɐɾʊ], Portuguese: [ˈalvɐɾu, ˈawvaɾu], Spanish: [ˈalβaɾo]) is a Spanish, Galician and Portuguese male given name and surname of Germanic Visigothic origin.

The patronymic surnames derived from this name are Álvarez (Spanish), Álvares (Galician and Portuguese) and Alves (Portuguese).

== Given name ==
=== Artists ===
- Alvaro (DJ), a DJ
- Álvaro Carrillo, Afro-Mexican songwriter.
- Álvaro Díaz González (born 1972), Chilean screenwriter, producer, and director
- Álvaro Guerrero, Mexican film actor
- Álvaro Guevara, Chilean painter
- Álvaro López, British drummer
- Álvaro Morte, Spanish film actor
- Álvaro Mutis, Colombian poet, novelist, and essayist
- Álvaro Pierri, Uruguayan classical guitarist
- Álvaro Pombo, Spanish poet and novelist
- Álvaro Soler, Spanish singer and songwriter
- Álvaro Torres, Salvadoran singer and songwriter

=== Politicians and statesmen ===
- Álvaro Alsogaray (1913–2005), Argentine liberal politician.
- Álvaro Antonio, Filipino politician
- Álvaro Araújo Castro, Colombian politician
- Álvaro Arzú (1946–2018), President of Guatemala from 1996 to 2000
- Álvaro Caminha (fl. 1493–1499), Portuguese Captain-major of São Tomé and Príncipe
- Álvaro Colom (1951–2023), President of Guatemala
- Álvaro Cunhal (1913–2005), Portuguese communist politician
- Álvaro de Castro, Prime Minister of Portugal in the 1920s
- Álvaro de Figueroa, 1st Count of Romanones (1863–1950), three times Prime Minister of Spain between 1912 and 1918
- Alvaro de Loyola Furtado (died 1981), Indian politician
- Álvaro de Luna ((between 1388 and 1390–1453), Spanish Constable of Castile
- Álvaro Delgado (born 1969), Uruguayan veterinarian and politician
- Álvaro García Linera (born 1962), Bolivian politician
- Álvaro García Ortiz, Spanish jurist and Attorney General
- Álvaro Gutiérrez (politician) (fl. 2006–2011), Peruvian politician
- Álvaro Noboa (born 1950), Ecuadorian businessman and politician
- Álvaro Obregón (1880–1928), Mexican general and President of Mexico from 1920 to 1924
- Álvaro Uribe Vélez (born 1952), President of Colombia from 2002 to 2010
- Alvaro Ruben Siriat (born 2014), Master of Shaking Head

=== Nobility ===
- Álvaro I of Kongo, King of Kongo from 1568 to 1587
- Álvaro II of Kongo, King of Kongo from 1587 to 1614
- Álvaro III of Kongo, King of Kongo from 1615 to 1622
- Álvaro IV of Kongo, King of Kongo from 1631 to 1636
- Álvaro V of Kongo, King of Kongo in 1636
- Álvaro VI of Kongo, King of Kongo from 1636 to 1641
- Álvaro VII of Kongo, King of Kongo from 1665 to 1666
- Álvaro VIII of Kongo, King of Kongo from 1666 to 1669
- Álvaro IX of Kongo, King of Kongo from 1669 to 1670
- Álvaro X of Kibangu, King of Kongo from 1688 to 1695
- Álvaro XI of Kongo, King of Kongo from 1764 to 1778
- Álvaro XIV of Kongo, King of Kongo from 1891 to 1896
- Álvar Fáñez (died 1114), Leonese military leader
- Álvaro Núñez de Lara (died 1218) (c. 1170–1218), Castilian nobleman
- Álvaro, Count of Urgell (1239–1268), also Viscount of Àger
- Álvaro Núñez de Lara (died 1287) ((c. 1261–1287), Castilian nobleman
- Álvaro Vaz de Almada, 1st Count of Avranches (c. 1390–1449), Portuguese nobleman
- Álvaro of Braganza (c. 1440–1504), Portuguese nobleman
- Álvar Núñez Cabeza de Vaca (died 1559), Spanish explorer
- Álvaro de Bazán, 1st Marquess of Santa Cruz (1526–1588), Spanish admiral
- Álvaro de Bazán, 2nd Marquess of Santa Cruz (1571–1646)
- Álvaro of Lencastre, 3rd Duke of Aveiro (1540–1626), Portuguese nobleman
- Infante Álvaro, Duke of Galliera (1910–1997), Spanish infante

=== Sports ===
- Álvar Enciso (born 1974), Spanish rugby union player
- Álvar Gimeno (born 1997), Spanish rugby union player
- Gabrian Alvaro D'Marchisio L (born 2014) Indonesian footballer
- Álvaro (footballer, born 1931), Brazilian footballer, full name Álvaro José Rodrigues Valente
- Álvaro (footballer, born 1977), Brazilian footballer, full name Álvaro Luiz Maior de Aquino
- Álvaro (footballer, born 1997), Brazilian footballer, full name Álvaro Vieira de Oliveira
- Álvaro (footballer, born 2001), Brazilian footballer, full name Álvaro de Oliveira Felicíssimo
- Álvaro Arbeloa, Spanish football player with the Spanish NT and Real Madrid CF
- Álvaro Bautista, Spanish Grand Prix motorcycle road racer
- Álvaro Cervera, Spanish football player and coach
- Álvaro Espinoza, Venezuelan baseball player
- Álvaro Gestido, Uruguayan football player
- Álvaro González (footballer, born 1990), Spanish football player with Marseille
- Álvaro Lozano, Colombian road cyclist
- Álvaro Magalhães, Portuguese football player
- Álvaro Martínez Beltrán, Spanish football player
- Álvaro Medrán, Spanish football player
- Álvaro Mejía (athlete), Colombian long-distance runner
- Álvaro Mejía (cyclist), Colombian cyclist
- Álvaro Mejía Pérez, Spanish football player
- Álvaro Mesén, Costa Rican football player
- Álvaro Morata, Spanish football player
- Álvaro Navarro Serra, Spanish Valencian pilota player
- Álvaro Negredo, Spanish football player
- Álvaro Novo, Spanish football player
- Álvaro Odriozola, Spanish football player
- Álvaro Parente, Portuguese racecar driver
- Álvaro Pino, Spanish road racing cyclist
- Álvaro Quirós, Spanish professional golfer
- Álvaro Recoba, Uruguayan football player
- Álvaro Ricaldi, Bolivian football player
- Álvaro Saborío, Costa Rican football player
- Álvaro Salvadores, Chilean basketball player
- Álvaro Santos, Brazilian football player
- Álvaro Sierra, Colombian road cyclist
- Álvaro Tejero, Spanish football player
- Álvaro Velasco (golfer) (born 1981), Spanish professional golfer
- Álvaro Velasco (weightlifter) (born 1971), Colombian weightlifter
- Álvaro Vieira, Brazilian footballer, full name Alvaro Luis Tavares Vieira
- Álvaro Zamith, first president of the Brazilian Football Confederation

=== Other ===
- Álvar García de Santa María (1370–1460), Spanish historian
- Álvaro Coutinho Aguirre (1899–1987), Brazilian agronomist, zoologist and naturalist
- Álvaro de Mendaña (1542–1595), Spanish navigator, explorer, and cartographer
- Álvaro del Portillo, Spanish engineer and Roman Catholic bishop
- Alvaro Luna Hernandez (born 1952), American activist
- Álvaro Pintado (born 2004), Spanish businessman
- Álvaro Saieh, Chilean businessman
- Álvaro Siza Vieira, Portuguese architect

== See also ==
- Alf
- Alvar (disambiguation)
- Álvarez (surname)
- Alvaro Cove, in Antarctica
- Álvaro de Bazán-class frigate, class of frigates in Spanish Navy
- Álvaro García (disambiguation)
