= Kongo Civil War =

1665–1709 war of succession between rival houses of the Kingdom of Kongo

The Kongo Civil War (1665–1709) was a war of succession between rival houses of the Kingdom of Kongo. The war was waged throughout the late 17th and early 18th centuries, between the House of Kinlaza and House of Kimpanzu. Numerous other factions entered the conflict, claiming descent from one or both parties, such as the Água Rosada of Kibangu and the da Silva of Soyo. By the end of the war, Kongo's vaunted capital had been destroyed and many Bakongo were sold into the Trans-Atlantic Slave Trade.

== Origins ==
The Kingdom of Kongo reached its apex during the reign of its most powerful king Garcia II. King Garcia II had come to power after the death of his brother, Álvaro VI, whom he had assisted in seizing the throne of Kongo from the House of Kimpanzu. Together, the brothers forged a new dynasty named for the Nlaza kanda, thus the House of Kinlaza. The ascension of this dynasty, which traced its legitimacy to the throne maternally as opposed to the paternal pedigree of the House of Kimpanzu and House of Nsundi was greeted with hostility from the beginning. Rival claimants for the throne of Kongo, by then the most powerful state in Central Africa, united behind the Kimpanzu. When King Garcia II came to power, the Kimpanzu were entrenched in the county of Soyo giving support to the remaining Nsundi and Kimpanzu partisans inside Kongo while claiming the title of Princes and later Grand Princes. By the end of Garcia's reign, Soyo was completely independent of Kongo and there was open hostility between the House of Kinlaza and the House of Kimpanzu including plots on the king's life and military engagements.

== Descent into war ==
In 1661, King Garcia II died leaving the throne to his second eldest son António. King António I was determined to remove the Portuguese from Angola, as they had been a thorn in Kongo's side since 1622. King Garcia II's gambit of assisting the Dutch in their short war with Portugal over the port of Luanda had turned out badly. Now Portugal was stronger than ever with control of Luanda, source of Kongo's nzimbu shell money. More and more, Kongo had to rely on Dutch support, which was not as forthcoming with Soyo as a competitor. These events set Garcia II's successor, António I, on a completely anti-Portuguese agenda.

=== Battle of Mbwila ===
Despite the rising tension between the states, the spark that would set them to war again would be a dispute over the tiny border town of Mbwila. The chiefdom had sworn fealty to both Kongo and Angola in the past. In 1665, a dispute between the claimant to the chiefdomship and his aunt drew Kongo and Angola into confrontation, Kongo supporting the claimant with Angola supporting the aunt. The two powers met at the Battle of Mbwila on October 29, 1665. In the ensuing battle, Kongo was badly defeated. King António I and many of the Kinlaza nobility were killed in the battle; the royal crown and sceptre were sent to Portugal as trophies. The boy heir to the Kongo throne was captured and taken to Luanda along with the head of António. The royal possessions of the king, which he feared to leave in Kongo because of rival partisans, were also lost on the battlefield. Robbed of their king, heir and symbols of leadership, the kingdom quickly descended into civil war as Kinlaza and Kimpanzu partisans vied for the throne.

== Soyo intervention in Kongo ==
The Battle of Mbwila did not have a drastic change on the borders of Central Africa. Kongo and Angola had no more control over this remote settlement than it had before the battle. The party that did prosper as a result of Kongo's defeat was the county of Soyo, home to many Kimpanzu partisans. Soyo, ruled by the Silva kanda, had been refuge to the Kimpanzu hiding out in the Luvota region in its south. With no strong opposition in Kongo to them, the da Silvas were able to impose their will on both Kinlaza and Kimpanzu claimants to the throne.

=== Beginning of Soyo intervention ===
King Afonso II of Kongo and Nkondo, not to be confused with Afonso II of Kongo from the 16th century, took the throne after the death of António I. The ascension of Afonso, a Kimpanzu partisan, played into Soyo's plans. The Kinlaza were quick to act against him and forced him out in place of Álvaro VII. The deposed king fled to Nkondo, where he continued to claim kingship over Kongo.

=== Invasions of Kongo (1666 and 1669) ===
King Álvaro VII turned out to be a tyrant, hated by both political rivals and the common people. In an unprecedented move, Soyo marched on the capital and assisted the people in Álvaro VII's overthrow and murder. In June, another Kinlaza king was elected. This time, the election would take place under the auspices of Soyo. Álvaro VIII was elected to the throne and ruled for three years. He allowed the Portuguese to search for gold in his kingdom, but no gold or silver was to be found in the realm. The House of Kinlaza kept tacit control of the throne, but Soyo proved to be the true master of the kingdom.

King Pedro III, another Kinlaza partisan with less sympathy toward Soyo, came to power in January 1669. Soyo sent a force yet again into Kongo and removed the king from power. This time, the da Silvas would place a Kimpanzu ruler on the throne. King Pedro III fled to Lemba (also known as Mbula or Bula), but that would not be the end of his dealings in Kongo.

=== End of Soyo intervention ===
King Álvaro IX was put in power by Soyo in hopes that a Kimpanzu might be easier to control. However, even among the Kimpanzu, nobles were beginning to resent Soyo's meddling in Kongo. In 1670 Álvaro IX was overthrown by Rafael I, the Marquis of Mpemba. Unlike the previous king, Rafael I was a Kinlaza and unwilling to be controlled by the Silvas.

==== Battle of Kitombo ====
Once on the throne the ambitious king sought Portuguese help in removing his overseers in Mbanza-Soyo. With the promise of mineral rights and opportunity to punish Soyo for dealings with the "heathen" (non-Catholic) Dutch, Angola sent an army under the command of João Soares de Almeida. After an initial victory against Soyo in which its ruler Count Estêvão da Silva was killed, the Angolan army was crushed at the Battle of Kitombo by a Soyo force led by Prince Pedro da Silva, brother of the dead count. The victory stopped Portuguese ambitions in Kongo until the 19th century but left Soyo in a much more precarious position. King Rafael remained on the throne as Soyo turned its focus toward protecting its own border and getting papal recognition. The victory at Kitombo is celebrated in certain parts of Angola on Saint Luke's Day (October 18).

== Sack of São Salvador ==
The Kimpanzu continued to rule the kingdom despite its tenuous situation. The more powerful provinces like Nsundi and Mbata were splitting off, and the power of the king waned as trade was rerouted to more stable areas outside of Kongo such as Soyo and Loango. King Rafael I was succeeded by the Marquis of Nkondo, Afonso III of Kongo. He only reigned shortly before the rise of King Daniel I. King Daniel I ruled four years before the Kinlaza made a final disastrous play for the throne. The deposed King Pedro III marched on São Salvador with Jaga mercenaries, resulting in a battle that killed King Daniel I and burnt most of the city to the ground in 1678. The destruction of the capital forced claimants from both sides of the conflict to rule from mountain fortresses. The Kinlaza retreated to Mbula while the Kimpanzu were headquartered at Mbamba Luvota in the south of Soyo. São Salvador became the grazing place of wild animals, where rival claimants would crown themselves then retreat before drawing the ire of opposition partisans. Even after its resettlement, the city would never regain its prominence.

== Divided kingdom ==
Without a center for trade and politics, the once powerful kingdom ceased to exist for two decades. This did not keep the partisans from trying to kill each other, however. King Pedro III was assassinated in 1680 under a banner of truce by Manuel de Nóbrega in revenge for the death of his brother, King Daniel I. King Pedro III was succeeded by his younger brother, João II. King João II fought tirelessly to dominate another Kinlaza stronghold, Kibangu, but to no avail. Kibangu eventually fell to forces from within opposed to the succession of Manuel I of Kibangu. Two brothers from the Água Rosada kanda, the product of a Kimpanzu father and Kinlaza mother, overthrew Manuel in 1688. The oldest brother, King Álvaro X, ruled the mountain fortress until his death in December 1695. It would be his brother, Pedro IV, that would oversee the restoration of Kongo. Meanwhile, Manuel de Nóbrega, brother of King Daniel I, ruled Mbamba Lovata in the name of the Kimpanzu and with the sanction of the powerful queen Suzana de Nóbrega. Manuel de Nóbrega used the power of Soyo to make war on all Kinlaza partisans within reach including the Queen Ana Afonso de Leão, the matriarch of the Kinlaza.

=== Antonians ===
In the midst of the Kongo Civil War (and perhaps because of it as well) a religious movement developed spearhead by a young noblewoman from the Mbidizi valley. Born Beatriz Kimpa Vita, the young woman's family lived in the sphere of influence of the Kinlaza. She claimed to be possessed by the spirit of Saint Anthony, hence the name of the movement. She claimed that Saint Anthony came to her in visions and declared her mission was to reunite the kingdom of Kongo. She later traveled to each of the mountain fortresses of the Kinlaza (Kibangu and Bula) She proclaimed her mission was to persuade the different claimants to resettle São Salvador and make an end to the bloodshed. After being rebuffed by all of them, she gathered her followers and marched into the ruins of the ancient capital in October or November 1704. With the assistance and protection of Pedro "Kibenga" Constantino da Silva, a half-Kimpanzu/half-Silva brigand nominally loyal to Pedro IV, Dona Beatriz crossed over from mere religious zealot to political liability. King Pedro IV, at the urging of Capuchin missionaries, had Dona Beatriz arrested for heresy and burned at the stake. King Pedro then left to take São Salvador and reunify the kingdom for good.

=== Battle of São Salvador ===
King Pedro had been working toward reunification of Kongo since before the rise of the Antonians. He had gained the fealty of nearly all claimants through political rather than military means. Even the Kimpanzu acknowledged him. On February 15, 1709 King Pedro marched on São Salvador at the head of his army carrying only a cross. In the ensuing battle between Pedro IV and Pedro Constantino da Silva, the Antonians were routed. Constantino da Silva was taken and beheaded as he tried to surrender.

=== Battle of Mbula ===
The defeated Antonians fled to Bula and sought the help of João II, who had still refused to recognize any king of Kongo other than himself. King João II marched his forces south to see what if anything could be gained at the expense of Pedro IV. On Saint Francis Day, October 4, the armies of João II and Pedro IV clashed within the Mbula territory. King Pedro IV was again victorious, and João II fled back to Lemba. King Pedro IV was so elated that he proclaimed St. Francis his savior and renamed his base São Francisco de Kibangu.

== End of the war ==
After these battles, Pedro dedicated himself to reunifying Kongo and making peace between the Kinlaza and Kimpanzu. A general pardon was given to all Kimpanzu, and a rotational succession was imposed between both factions. Manuel Makasa, youngest brother of Kibenga and the leading Kimpanzu claimant, became Pedro's son-in-law and heir. King Pedro died in 1718, leaving an at least partially reunified kingdom with its capital back at São Salvador. Prince Mauel Masaka became king under the name Manuel II of Kongo. After him, Garcia IV Nkanga a Mvemba succeeded peacefully to the throne according to Pedro's compromise agreement. King Garcia the IV was a member of the Mbula faction of Kinlaza. After him, the Kinlaza of Bula stopped making independent claims for the throne of Kongo. King Pedro IV's descendants remained in Kibangu, claiming the title of prince but never pressing to become king of Kongo. Peace reigned more or less for the next 50 years with very few intervals. The throne rotated mainly between the Kinlaza of the east and the Kimpanzu of the west. Despite the settlement and restoration of the monarchy, Kongo was long past its glory days. It never regained its prominence economically or politically, disintegrating into fiefdoms recognising the King of Kongo but not truly under his control.

== Trans-Atlantic slave trade ==
During the Civil War, entire populations were conscripted into the army to support the war effort. Neighbouring peoples were also hired as mercenaries. This led to the acquisition of captives from both sides of the war, resulting in members of rival factions being enslaved, along with their family and supporters. Many of these captives, BaKongo people and neighbouring mercenaries, were sold into the Atlantic slave trade. Following the defeat of the Antonians by Pedro IV, at the battle of Sao Salvador, over thirty thousand of them were sold into Trans-Atlantic slavery. The main export ports were Loango and Luanda. At Loango, captives were sold to the Dutch & English for transport to North America and the Caribbean. However, the Portuguese retained control of Luanda, ensuring the flow of captives to Brazil.

== See also ==
- House of Kimpanzu
- House of Kinlaza
- Kingdom of Kongo
- List of Rulers of Kongo
- History of Angola
