= Battle of São Salvador =

1709 battle

- Part of the Kongo Civil War
Date	15 February 1709
Location	Mbanza-Kongo, Angola
Result	Orthodox victory

Belligerents
Orthodox Catholics of Kingdom of Kongo	Antonian Catholics of Kingdom of Kongo

Commanders and leaders
King Pedro IV; Marquis of Mpemba	Prince Pedro Constantino da Silva †

Strength
20,000 infantry	Unknown number of infantry

Casualties and losses
Unknown	Unknown but including Prince Pedro Constantino da Silva

The Battle of São Salvador was a military engagement during the Kongo Civil War that pitted the remnants of Dona Beatriz's Antonianism religious movement against the orthodox Catholic followers of King Pedro IV.

== Prelude ==
Toward the end of the Kongo Civil War, the religious leader Dona Beatriz had successfully started a movement to reoccupy the abandoned capital of São Salvador and attempt to bring an end to the bloodshed between the ruling kandas of Kongo. During her resettlement of Kongo, she had attracted the support of Pedro Constantino da Silva also known as Kibenga. Seeking to exploit the movement, Kibenga lent his support to it while at the same time undermining King Pedro IV. King Pedro IV had been working toward restoring Kongo after decades of civil war, even going so far as to name Kibenga Prince of Kongo. Kibenga, who had switched allegiance on more than one occasion, betrayed King Pedro and threw his military support behind the Antonians. When Dona Beatriz was captured and executed by Pedro IV, Kibenga was left in charge of a religious movement he didn't really believe in. King Pedro IV had issued a pardon to all partisans (Kinlaza and Kimpanzu alike) in hopes of forestalling further bloodshed. When this as well as Pedro's Capuchin allies were unable to rein in Kibenga, Pedro IV led a sort of holy war to retake the capital and stamp out the Antonians once and for all.

== Battle and aftermath ==
Brandishing only a cross and going with the support of the church, Pedro IV marched on São Salvador with an army of 20,000 men against Kibenga and his Antonians. In the engagement that followed, the Antonians were utterly routed. Kibenga tried to appeal to the pardon, but was killed and decapitated in the chaos of battle. At long last, Pedro IV was back in the capital for good. The battle marked the end of the period where rival claimants ruled in name only from fortified positions throughout the kingdom. King Pedro IV continued his policy of peaceful resolution engaging in only one more major battle before his death in 1718.

== See also ==
- Kongo Civil War
- Antonianism
