= Ana Afonso de Leão =

Queen of Nkondo
- Reign: 1673 - 1709
- Predecessor: Afonso III
- Successor: None, Kingdom unified
- Born: c. 1625
- Died: 1710 (aged 84/85)
- Spouse: Afonso II
- House: House of Kinlaza
- Religion: Catholic

Ana Afonso de Leão (c. 1625 - 1710) was the queen regnant of the Kingdom of Nkondo between 1673 and 1710. She conquered the territories of Lemba and Matari, as well as those located along the Mbidizi river in the Kingdom of Kongo (in the regions of present-day Angola and the Democratic Republic of Congo) in the 17th century. She was a decisive figure during the Kongolese civil war.

== Early life ==
Born around 1625, Ana Afonso de Leão was a sister of king Garcia II Afonso, and the wife of the ephemeral sovereign Afonso II of Kongo and Nkondo.

== Queen of Nkondo ==
During the civil war between the Kanda Kinlaza and Kimpanzu which ravaged the Kingdom of Kongo between 1665 and 1709, Ana Afonso de Leão established a quasi-independent regional principality which included the marquises of Nkondo and Mpemba and the Duchy of Mbamba. The territories that it controlled between 1682 and 1714 are called "The Land of the Queen".

Widowed since 1669, she had retired to Nkondo, between Ambriz and Nkusu where she was considered the matriarch of the House of Kinlaza, when she undertook to fight the king Manuel I between 1682 and 1693. At the end of 1691, Manuel I and his allies of Soyo invaded Nkondo and drove out Queen Ana Afonso de Leão. Pedro Valle de Lagrimas, the Duke of Mbamba and cousin of the queen, came to her aid, but he was defeated in May 1692.

After the elimination of Manuel, two of the queen's nephews, Alexis Afonso, the new Duke of Mbamba and Pedro Constantino de Silva, Marquis of Wembo, hatched a plot against her in order to oust him. She fled and settled in various places, including Ngandu. In September 1696, two of his captains, D. Antonio Afonso Mpanzu in Kivasi and D. Garcia Makunga, battled with Pedro Constantino, and retook Nkondo, the former residence of the queen.

Due to her royal ancestry, Dona Ana's authority was great and she actively participated in negotiations to restore the unity of the kingdom. In 1696, there were two main competitors: Pedro IV Água Rosada, king in Kibangu, and João II who reigned in Lemba-Bula. Queen Ana's preferences went to her relative João II and in March 1696, she sent Father Luke de Caltanissetta as ambassador to Lemba. King João II refused to accept the conditions considered essential to ensure a final peace: the restitution of Kiowa kia Nza, which he had taken from the count of Soyo, and the occupation of the ancient capital São Salvador.

Queen Dona Ana then supported the candidacy of another of her parents from Kanda Kinlaza, D. António de Leão Mapnzu Kinvangi, son of the ephemeral king Álvaro VII of Kongo at the insistence of Father François de Pavie, another Italian Capuchin missionary. He made his first stay in Luanda between 1680 and 1688. Back in Europe, he was appointed Prefect of the Mission in 1693. He then traveled the kingdom, striving to promote the election of a single king. He failed and returned to Europe in 1702. She finally declared herself favorable to the king of Kibangu, Pedro IV, a member of the Kinlaza clan (Nlaza Kanda) through his father. Thanks to his authority, the principal leaders of the country swore loyalty to this king, who was crowned in São Salvador on 2 August 1696; however the ambitions of some potentates stood in the way of its restoration which only took place in 1709.

The date of Dona Ana's death is unknown but believed to be 1710, because the queen was still living in 1707, when Pope Clement XI sent her a letter dated that year.

== Family ==
Besides her nephews Alexis Afonso, Pedro Constantinho da Siva, and the latter's half-brother, the future king Manuel II of Kongo, her relatives also included her son-in-law D. Daniel Marquis de Mpemba, her other nephew D. Alvaro, duke of Mbata, whom she tried to impose as king in Nkondo between 1700 and 1707, and her niece Dona Catarina, whose daughter Dona Ana ruled the duchy of Owando after the death of her husband D. Clemente.

== Sources ==
- Fernando Campos « O rei D. Pedro IV Ne Nsamu a Mbemba. A unidade do Congo », dans Africa. Revista do centro de Estudos Africanos, USP S. Paulo 18-19 (1) 1995/1996 p. 159-199 & USP S. Paulo 20-21 1997/1998 p. 305-375.
- John K. Thornton Elite Women in the Kingdom of Kongo: Historical Perspectives on Women's Political Power dans « The Journal of African History » publié par Cambridge University Press. Vol. 47, No. 3 (2006), p. 437-460
