= Garcia III of Kibangu =

Garcia III Nkanga a Mvemba was a ruler of Kibangu and was one of the two main Kinlaza claimants to the throne of the Kingdom of Kongo during its civil war, the other being the King of Lemba. He ruled the Kingdom of Kibangu from 1669 to 1685.

== Rule ==
After the deposition of Pedro III, the House of Kinlaza split between the claimant to the throne at São Salvador, Pedro III who was based at Lemba, and the independent Kingdom of Kibangu, with Garcia III as its head. After the Sack of São Salvador in 1678, Garcia III began claiming the throne of Kongo, opposed by the Kinlaza King of Lemba (Pedro III 1678-80 and João II 1680–85) and the Kimpanzu King of Mbamba Lovata (Manuel de Nóbrega). Garcia III successfully defended Kibangu against the forces of João II from 1680 until he was succeeded by André I in 1685.

Preceded by N/A	Awenekongo of Kibangu; 1669–1685	Succeeded by André I

Preceded by Daniel I	Manikongo (Kibangu Claimant); 1678–1685	Succeeded by André I
