= Rafael I of Kongo =

Rafael I
- Mwene Kongo
- Reign: end of 1670 – Mid 1673
- Predecessor: Álvaro IX
- Successor: Afonso III
- Died: Mid 1673
- Dynasty: House of Kinlaza

Rafael I Nzinga a Nkanga (died 1673) was a ruler of the Kingdom of Kongo during its civil war. He ruled from 1670 to 1673.

== Accession to the throne ==
During the civil war period, Soyo, previously under the control of Kongo, became independent. It still regularly interfered with Kongolese affairs and invaded several times to depose kings who were not pro-Soyo. When the Soyo invaded in 1669, they overthrew Pedro III, who was a member of the House of Kinlaza and replaced him with Álvaro IX, who was a member of the more Soyo sympathetic House of Kimpanzu. However even the nobles of Kimpanzu had grown resentful of Soyo interfering in Kongo affairs. Rafael deposed Álvaro and took his place as Manikongo.

== Rule ==
After his ascension, Rafael was driven from his capital São Salvador by Soyo, who were receiving Dutch aid, and were slowly becoming as powerful as Kongo. Rafael travelled to Luanda and sought Portuguese aid, who were rivals of the Dutch at the time, to help subdue Soyo. In return he promised Portugal money, mineral concessions and the right to build a fortress in Soyo to keep out the Dutch. The Battle of Kitombo was a humiliating defeat for Angola and they were forced to recognise Soyo's independence and the Pope acquired a papal nuncio from the King of Portugal stating that the crown would make no more attempts on its sovereignty. However this did give Rafael the opportunity to reoccupy the São Salvador and continue rule until 1673.

Preceded by Álvaro IX	Manikongo; 1670–1673	Succeeded by Afonso III
