= Água Rosada =

1800s–1900s ruling dynasty of the Kingdom of Kongo

House of Água Rosada Casa de Água Rosada
- Parent house: House of Kinlaza House of Kimpanzu
- Country: Kingdom of Kongo Kingdom of Loango Kingdom of Kakongo Kingdom of Ngoyo Kingdom of Ndongo Kingdom of Vungu
- Founded: 1669/70
- Founder: Garcia III (1st ruler), Álvaro X and Pedro IV
- Final ruler: Manuel III
- Titles: List: King of Kongo; King of Loango; King of Kakongo; King of Ngoyo; King on this side of the Zaire and beyond it; King of Vungu; Lord of the Ambundu; Lord of Angola; Lord of Aquisima; Lord of Musuru; Lord of Matamba; Lord of Malilu; Lord of Musuko; Lord of Anzizo; Lord of the conquest of Pangu-Alumbu
- Deposition: Kingdom of Kongo: 1914

The House of Água Rosada was the last ruling house of the Kingdom of Kongo during the 19th and 20th centuries. It was also one of the main factions during the Kongo Civil War along with the Mpanzu, Nlaza and Kinkanga a Mvika kandas.

== Etymology ==
In Portuguese "Água Rosada" means ""Pink Water"", referring to the Congo River.

== Origins ==
The House of Água Rosada was established by the three sons of King Sebastião I of Kongo, who was a member of the House of Kinlaza and his spouse was a member of the House of Kimpanzu, meaning that the House was born with the union of parts of the Houses of Kinzala and Kimpanzu. Ultimately this meant they had the same origin of the others and so the legitimacy to reign.

The three brothers were initially headquartered at the mountain fortress of Kibangu. During the Civil War all parties claimed kingship over Kongo (or what was left of it), but their power rarely spread outside their fortresses or the immediate surrounding areas.

The House came to predominance when Pedro IV of Kongo reunified the realm in 1709, putting an end to 44 years of Civil War. Later he declared a doctrine of shared power by which the throne would shift (in due time) from Kinlaza to the Kimpanzu and back, while the Água Rosada appear to have continued as neutral in Pedro's fortress of Kibangu.

The House of Água Rosada produced 8 Manikongos including the last 5.

== Sources ==
- Fernando Campos « O rei D. Pedro IV Ne Nsamu a Mbemba. A unidade do Congo », dans Africa. Revista do centro de Estudos Africanos, USP S. Paulo 18-19 (1) 1995/1996 p. 159-199 & USP S. Paulo 20-21 1997/1998 p. 305-375.
- John K.. Thornton, The Kongolese Saint Anthony: Dona Beatriz Kimpa Vita and the Antonian Movement, 1684–1706, Cambridge University, 1998.
