= Álvaro V of Kongo =

Álvaro V
- Manikongo
- Reign: 27 February to 14 August 1636
- Predecessor: Álvaro IV
- Successor: Álvaro VI
Regnal name
- Álvaro V Mpanzu a Nimi
- Dynasty: Kimpanzu dynasty

Álvaro V of Kongo, also known as Álvaro V Mpanzu a Nimi, was the ruler of the Kingdom of Kongo for a short period in 1636.

The king was part of the Kimpanzu kanda. He was a cousin to the founding monarchs of the Kinlaza kanda that would rule the kingdom until the Kongo Civil War. King Alvaro V took power after the poisoning of the young king Alvaro IV. King Alvaro V was jealous of the growing power and status of the future Alvaro VI and his brother. He raised an army against them and was defeated. The brothers spared him and allowed him to continue as king. Six months later, the king made a second attempt, at which he was slain and the throne passed to King Alvaro VI of the Kinlaza.

== See also ==
- Kingdom of Kongo
- List of rulers of Kongo
- Kimpanzu
- Kongo Civil War

Preceded by Álvaro IV	Manikongo; 1636	Succeeded by Álvaro VI
