= Daniel I of Kongo =

Daniel I
- Mwene Kongo
- Reign: Mid 1674 – Mid 1678
- Predecessor: Afonso III
- Successor: Interregnum
- Died: Mid 1678
- Dynasty: House of Kimpanzu

Daniel I Miala mia Nzimbwila (died 1678) was a ruler of the Kingdom of Kongo during its civil war between the various royal houses. He ruled from 1674 to 1678.

== Rule ==
Daniel I ruled in São Salvador as the current king represented by the House of Kimpanzu. He had succeeded the Marquis of Nkondo, Afonso III and became ruler of the kingdom. He continued to rule for four years until the Kinlaza claimant to the throne, Pedro III, made a disastrous play for the capital. King Pedro had been based at the Kinlaza mountain fortress of Lemba since his deposition by Soyo in 1669.

In Mid 1678, marched on São Salvador with Jaga mercenaries resulting in a battle which burnt the majority of the city to the ground. Daniel was killed in the battle, which is known as the Sack of São Salvador, ending his rule. The destruction of the kingdom's capital meant that the nation essentially ceased to exist for over twenty years, instead split into three rival kingdoms ruled by the various claimants to the Kongo throne of the three houses. Manuel II succeeded his brother Daniel as the ruler of the Kingdom of Mbamba Lovata for the Kimpanzu.

Preceded by Afonso III	Manikongo; 1674–1678	Succeeded by Manuel II (Kingdom of Mbamba Lovata) Garcia III (Kingdom of Kibangu) Pedro III (Kingdom of Lemba)
