= Álvaro IX of Kongo =

Álvaro IX
- Mwene Kongo
- Reign: June 1669 – end of 1670
- Predecessor: Pedro III
- Successor: Rafael I
- Born: 1650
- Died: 1670 (aged 19/29)
- Dynasty: House of Kimpanzu

Álvaro IX Mpanzu a Ntivila (1650–1670) was a ruler of the Kingdom of Kongo during its civil war period. He ruled from June 1669 to 1670.

== Pre-Rule ==
He was the first member of the House of Kimpanzu to become the king since Afonso II was king at the beginning of the civil war period. Afonso II had been forced off the throne by the House of Kinlaza, and had set up Kimpanzu's powerbase in the mountainous Nkondo. Soyo intervened in Kongo again by invasion in 1669 and deposed the Kinlaza king Pedro III who was unsympathetic to Soyo. He fled to Lemba to start continue his reign and to fight against Kimpanzu rule.

== Rule and Deposition ==
The da Silvas, the ruling house of Soyo, were determined to replace the king with a Kimpanzu, as they hoped he would be easier to control, considering the alliance between Soyo and the house. However even amongst the nobles of Kimpanzu were starting to resent the intervention of Soyo in Kongo affairs. In 1670, Álvaro IX was overthrown by Rafael I who preceded him as a more anti-Soyo king, who ended Soyo intervention in the kingdom.

Preceded by Pedro III	Manikongo; 1669–1670	Succeeded by Rafael I
