= Manuel II of Kongo =

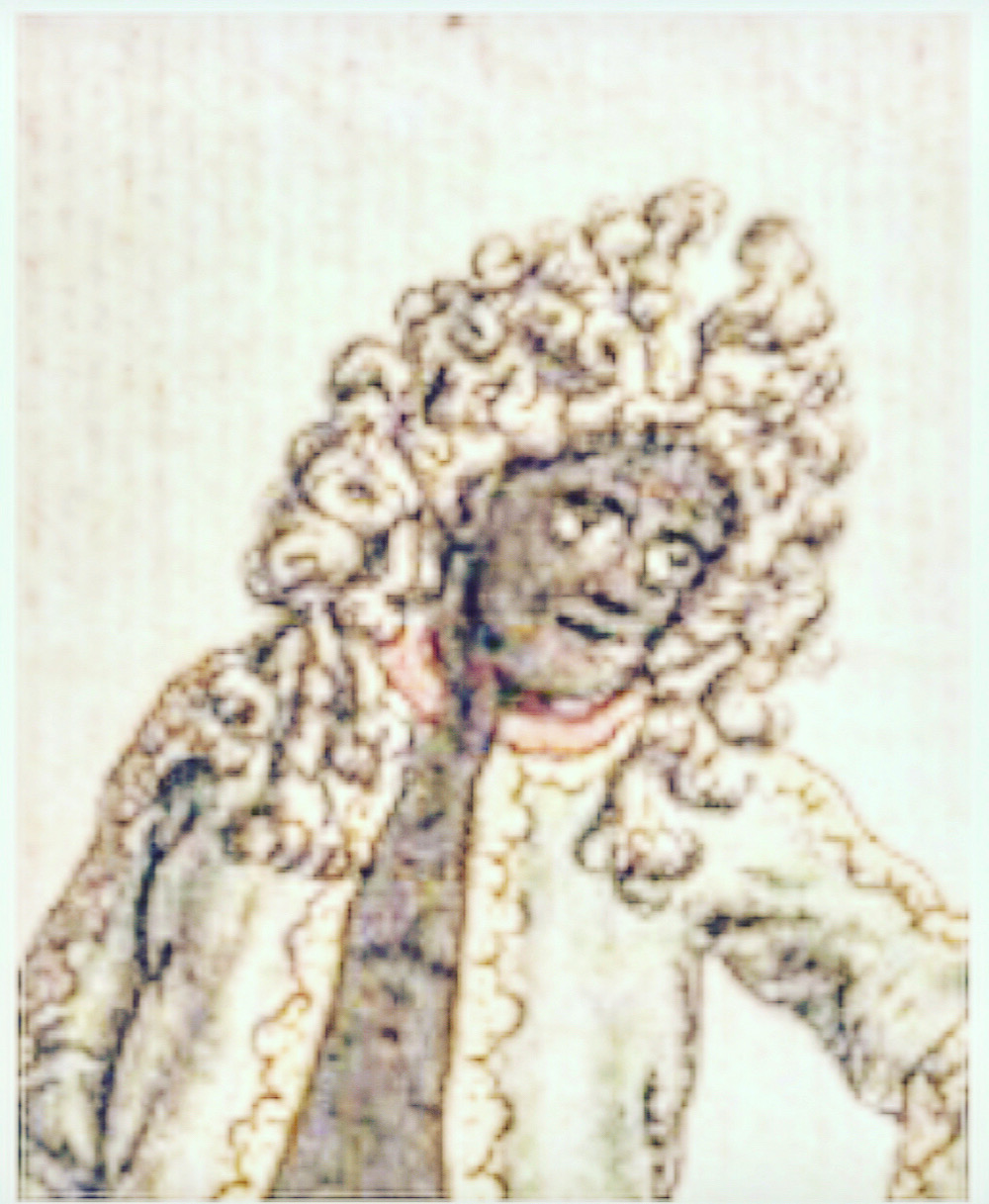
Manuel II of Kongo

Manuel II or Manuel II Mpanzu a Nimi (???-1743) was ruler of the Kingdom of Kongo (1718–1743). He ruled in a period of "rotating lineages" as planned by his predecessor and was of the Kimpanzu. He had once fought against Pedro during the recapture of São Salvador.

== Rule in Mbamba Lovata ==
Manuel was the brother of Daniel I, and when he was killed in the Sack of São Salvador, became the main Kimpanzu claimant to the Kongo throne. He retreated to Mbamba Lovata, where he established himself as the Awenekongo which became one of three main post-civil war states, the other two held by separate Kinlaza claimants to the throne of Kongo. In 1680, King Pedro III was ruling the rival kingdom of Lemba, where he claimed the Kongo throne in opposition to the House of Kimpanzu partisans residing in Soyo's southern province of Luvota. Manuel had sworn vengeance and orchestrated a plot to kill Pedro III. Under the auspice of a truce, treacherously negotiated by the Prince of Soyo, Pedro III was lured into a trap expecting to make peace through marriage to a Kimpanzu noble. Instead, Manuel emerged from the Soyo wedding train dressed as a bride and shot Pedro III to death before escaping. The particular episode in Kongo's history would become one of the sticking points keeping the nobility from finding lasting peace.

After the assassination of Pedro III, Manuel fought to establish his claim over Kongo, which eventually culminated in a Battle for São Salvador, where he allied with Pedro Constantinho da Silva and his partisans who were once subordinates of Pedro IV. The forces of Pedro and Manuel clashed, but eventually, Pedro was victorious, leaving him in control of the capital and therefore de facto Manikongo of Kongo. Manuel did not give up his claim for 6 years and continued to rule a rival administration in Mbamba Lovata until an agreement between Pedro and Manuel in 1715 led to the re-establishment of the throne alternating between the Kinlaza and Kimpanzu houses.

== Rule in São Salvador ==
When Pedro died in 1718, the agreement between the houses was honored, and Manuel was crowned as Manuel II of Kongo, moving his royal house to the city. He ruled until his death in 1743, when the throne passed to Garcia IV, who was of the House of Kinlaza.

Preceded by Pedro IV	Manikongo; 1718–1743	Succeeded by Garcia IV
Preceded by Daniel I (As Manikongo)	Awenekongo of Mbamba Lovata; 1678-1715	Succeeded by N/A
