= Apollonia Mafuta =

Kongolese Prophet

- Died: 2 July 1706
- Other names: Mama Mafuta; Old Simeon
- Years active: 1703-4 to 1706
- Known for: Religious prophecies and visions

Apollonia Mafuta also known as Mama Mafuta (died 2 July 1706) was a Kongolese Catholic prophet and revolutionary from the Kibangu Province of the Kingdom of Kongo who emerged in 1703 or 1704, foretelling the kingdom's destruction.

She later joined Kimpa Vita in São Salvador, becoming closely allied with the Antonian Movement and establishing her own chapel and ministry there.

== Life ==
In Mafuta's initial vision, she was visited by the Virgin Mary, who informed her that her son Jesus was angry with the people of Kibangu. In a series of visions, Jesus, the Virgin Mary, the apostles, and saints then appeared to Mafuta as Black Africans, and Kongo was the center of the Holy Land. Jesus wanted the people of Kibangu to re-colonize São Salvador, the historical capital of the kingdom. Jesus's anger was also directed toward King Pedro IV, who was slowing the resettlement of São Salvador. Shortly thereafter, Mafuta discovered an oddly-shaped stone which she said resembled Jesus's deformed head, defaced by the enemies of Christians. During this time, Mafuta was also said to have cured a woman of a snakebite using the sign of the cross and invoking the name of the Holy Trinity.

Mafuta consulted with Father Bernardo, a Capuchin missionary, who did not believe her story, regarding her insane. She then began spreading her teachings in Kibangu, denouncing and burning nkisis (Christian objects of worship) as witchcraft and calling various Kibangu people ndokis (those who worked evil by supernatural means). Mafuta vowed to fight evil in the Kongo through a purification of traditional Kongolese Christianity. During this time, Mafuta also issued a prophesy that God would level Mount Kibangu and destroy everyone there, if the Kongolese did not carry out Jesus's demands. Mafuta's followers came from various social classes, including both nobles and peasants, even inspiring King Pedro's wife, Hippólita, with her teachings. Father Bernardo encouraged Pedro to capture Mafuta, which he did, however she was released shortly thereafter. Another Capuchin missionary, Father Da Gallo, perceived Mafuta as harmless to the dominant iteration of Catholicism.

Sometimes considered a direct follower of Mafuta, Kimpa Vita echoed many of Mafuta's complaints about Pedro's Kingdom, waged war against local greed and jealousy, and compelled the king to resettle São Salvador in her preaching. Between October or November 1704 and the end of their lives, Mafuta joined Vita in São Salvador. During this time, Mafuta became closely allied with Kimpa Vita and the Antonian Movement, and practiced a parallel version of Christianity alongside the Antonians. She took the name "Old Simeon" and established a chapel in the old capital, dedicating alters to Saints Isabel, Ursula, and Anne. Here, she began sending her own missionaries out into Kongo, conducted mass, heard confessions, and performed other spiritual functions.

After Vita became pregnant and gave birth to her companion João Barrio's child, Mafuta began journeying back with her to Mbidizi, Vita's birthplace. In early May 1706, an envoy of the local king, Kinlaza, caught the party hiding in a haystack. The envoy then turned Mafuta, Barrio, and Vita in to King Pedro at his temporary capital in Evululu. Father Bernardo and Pedro's advisor, Manuel da Cruz Barbosa, decided that Pedro should try the three as heretics in Evululu rather than at the diocese in Luanda. When interviewed, Mafuta was in a “dismal state” of old age and could not even speak to the king or his court. After interviewing the three, the royal council sentenced them to death by public burning. Mafuta, still considered insane, harmless, and possibly possessed by the devil, was tied by a single cord when she was brought to Evululu. The prophet failed to make a public statement before her execution on July 2, 1706, but was spared because the priests thought her not sane enough to receive the sacrament of confession.

== Legacy ==
Today, scholars include Mafuta within the African canon of anti-colonial prophets. Mafuta is also considered a revolutionary by some scholars.

Reggae musician Bob Marley (of the Congo-Bongo Nation of Jamaica) paid homage to Vita and Mafuta in his song "Natty Dread", referring to their dreadlocks.
