= Afonso II of Kongo and Nkondo =

Mwene Kongo in November to December 1665

Afonso II
- Mwene Kongo
- Reign: November – December 1665
- Predecessor: António I
- Successor: Álvaro VII
- Spouse: Ana Afonso de Leão
- Dynasty: Kimpanzu dynasty
- Mother: Suzana de Nóbrega

Afonso II of Kongo and Nkondo was a ruler of the kingdom of Kongo in the period following the Kongo Civil War. He was a member of the House of Kimpanzu and may have been supported in his claim for the throne by partisans in Soyo. He took the throne in November 1665 in the first of a series of power grabs for the throne of the kingdom.

== Overthrow and exile ==
The House of Kinlaza, which had held the throne of Kongo for the last three decades, acted swiftly to remove their rivals from power. King Afonso II was deposed only a month into his term in December 1665. In place of Afonso II, the Kinlaza put Álvaro VII in power. The deposed king was forced to flee into the mountains of Nkondo where he ruled in opposition to the Kinlaza partisans in Kongo. He ruled Nkondo until his death in 1669.

== See also ==
- List of Manikongo of Kongo
- Kingdom of Kongo
- House of Kimpanzu
- House of Kinlaza

Preceded by António I	Manikongo; 1665	Succeeded by Álvaro VII
