= Kimpa Vita =

Kongo Empire prophet

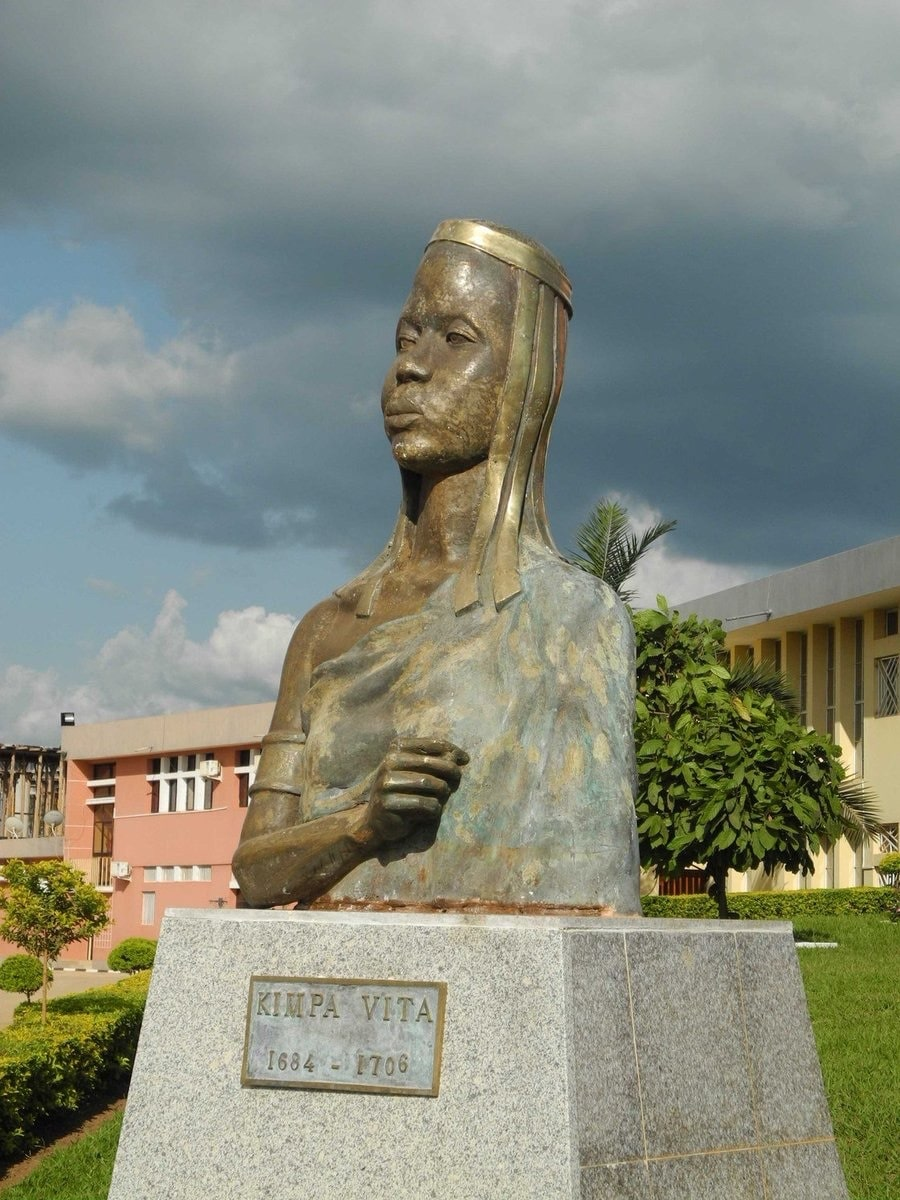
- Kimpa Vita's statue in Angola
- Full name: Dona Beatriz Kimpa Vita Nsimba
- Known for: Founder of Antonianism
- Born: 1684; Kingdom of Kongo
- Died: July 2, 1706 (aged 21–22); Evululu

Dona Beatriz Kimpa Vita, also known as Kimpa Mvita, Cimpa Vita or Tsimpa Vita (1684 – 2 July 1706), was a Kongolese prophetess and leader of her own Christian movement, Antonianism; this movement taught that Jesus and other early Christian figures were from the Kongo Kingdom.

The name "Dona" indicates that she was born into a family of high Kongolese nobility; she was later given the name "Beatriz" after the Catholic saint. Her teaching grew out of the traditions of the Catholic Church in Kongo, and caused her to upbraid the Catholic priests for not believing as she did.

Dona Beatriz believed the teachings of St. Anthony and used this claim to attempt to restore the ideal of Kongo as a unified Christian kingdom. Kimpa Vita is seen as an antislavery figure and as anticipating African democracy movements. While the role of Kimpa Vita is widely overlooked, the years of her movement are some of the best documented in Kongo's history.

== Early life ==
Beatriz Kimpa Vita, also referred to as Beatrice of Congo, was born near Mount Kibangu in Angola, Kongo Kingdom, around 1684. She was born into a family of the Kongo nobility, probably of the class called Mwana Kongo, and her father was a regional commander of the King's army. This noble status permitted Kimpa Vita to study as an nganda marinda, a form of religious medium. Kimpa Vita was baptized Dona Beatriz at her father's behest, following the Catholic beliefs of the Kings. Some modern scholars believe that she was connected to King António I, because of his Kikongo name, Vita a Nkanga.

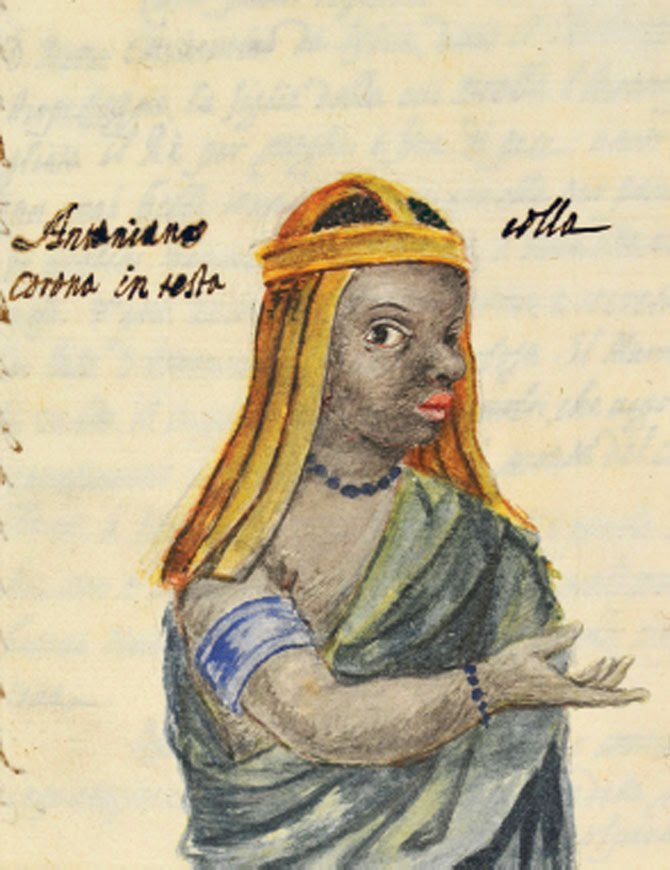
Contemporary drawing by Bernardo da Gallo

At the time of her birth, Kongo was torn by civil war. These wars had started shortly after the death of António I at the Battle of Mbwila in 1665, and had resulted in the abandonment of the ancient capital of São Salvador (present-day Mbanza Kongo) in 1678 and the division of the country by rival pretenders to the throne.

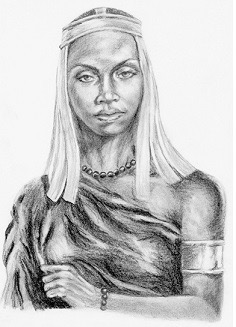
Modern interpretive drawing

According to her testimony, given at an inquest on her life, Kimpa Vita had visions by God Kongo and was considered to be a prophetess to the Kongolese, declaring that Jesus, Yissa’Yah Kongo, came from the Kongo kingdom. She forbade her people to let the Portuguese in because they were going to enslave them. She kept proclaiming the message until King Pedro IV, after consulting with Italian Capuchin priests, burned her at the stake.

== Call to mission ==
Beatriz went to live among colonists sent out by King Pedro IV, one of several rival rulers of Kongo, to reoccupy the ancient and now abandoned capital of São Salvador. There was a great deal of religious fervor among these colonists who were tired of the endless civil wars in the country, and many had become followers of an old prophet, Appolonia Mafuta.

During a supernatural illness in 1704, Kimpa Vita claimed to have received visions of God while on the verge of death, wherein she was given divine commandment to preach to King Pedro IV, resurrecting her. She proclaimed that Jesus was a Kongo and that there will be slavery if they trusted the Portuguese. While in this state, she learned that Kongo must reunite under a new king, for the civil wars that had plagued Kongo since the battle of Mbwila in 1665 had angered Christ. She was ordered to unite the Congo under one king. Following the practices of Catholic monks, she forwent all her earthly possessions and set out on her mission to preach to King Pedro IV. During her mission, she destroyed Kongo Nkisi, charms inhabited by spiritual entities, claiming them to be false idols. She also destroyed non-Kongolese Catholic paraphernalia. When she had her audience with King Pedro IV, she denounced him for his lack of will to restore the Kongo to its former glory; additionally, she denounced an Italian priest, Bernardo de Gallo, accusing him of not wanting black saints in Kongo. King Pedro IV listened to the words of Kimpa Vita, but did not act upon them. She then went to visit his rival João II at Mbula (near the Congo River close to modern Matadi), who also refused to hear her. However, in a short time she was able to gather a significant number of followers and became a factor in the struggle for power. Her movement recognized the papal primate but was hostile towards the European missionaries in Congo. Three months later, Kimpa Vita led her followers to the abandoned capital of São Salvador where they would call to the people in the countryside and rapidly repopulate the city. This was recognized by Bernardo de Gallo—who claimed Kimpa Vita to be possessed by the devil–to be an incredible act and led her to be adored and acclaimed as the restorer of Kongo.

While she was in São Salvador, which she and her followers occupied in 1705, she built a special residence for herself in the ruined cathedral, and also called the formerly ruined and abandoned capital to be reoccupied by thousands of mostly peasant followers. However, she soon won noble converts as well, including Pedro Constantinho da Silva Kibenga, the commander of one of Pedro IV's armies sent to reoccupy the city. Since he chose his devotion to Beatriz as an opportunity to rebel, Pedro IV decided to destroy Kimpa Vita; all the more as his own wife, Hipolita, had become an Antonian convert.

During her time in São Salvador, Kimpa Vita would grow to doubt the validity of her movement and her possession by Saint Anthony, as she became pregnant by a man named João Barro, despite her teachings of chastity. Kimpa Vita believed that this sin had stripped her of virtue and is what led to her eventual downfall. Kimpa Vita kept the pregnancy a secret from her followers and soon returned to her hometown with the child.

Beatriz sent out missionaries of her movement to other provinces. They were not successful in the coastal province of Soyo, where the Prince expelled them, but they were much more successful in the dissident southern part of Soyo and Mbamba Lovata, which lay south of Soyo. There they won converts, especially among partisans of the old queen Suzana de Nóbrega. Manuel Makasa, one of these partisans also became an Antonian and moved to São Salvador.

== Religious tenets ==
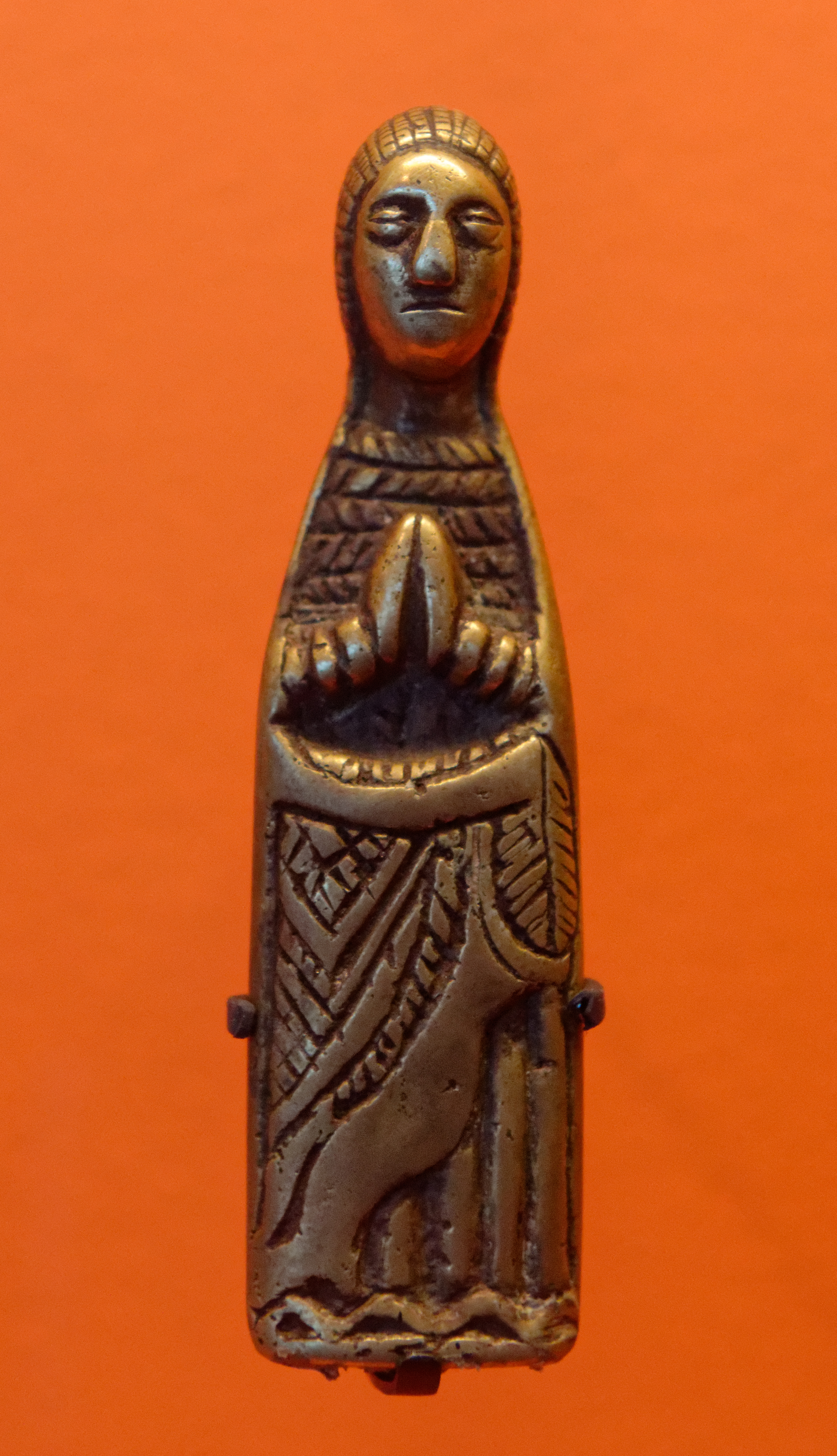
Virgin Mary in copper alloy produced within the Kongo Kingdom during the 18th century

Much of her teaching is known from the Salve Antoniana, a prayer she adapted from the Catholic prayer Salve Regina (Hail Holy Queen) into an anthem of the movement. Among other things, the Salve Antoniana taught that God was only concerned with believers' intentions, not with sacraments or good works, and that Saint Anthony was the greatest one - in fact, a "second God".

Kimpa Vita's teachings stated that Kongolese Catholicism was the true form of Catholicism and that the teachings and practices of white and Capuchin Catholics were incorrect and elitist. She believed that black people originated from the skin of a fig tree, and thus many followers of the Antonine Movement wore cloth spun from the bark of these trees. She believed that black was the true color of humanity and that white was the color of death, and thus taught that the principal characters in Christianity, including Jesus, Mary and Saint Francis, were all born in Kongo and were in fact Kongolese. Many of these beliefs were greatly influential in raising the hope and morale of the Kongolese people during a time of civil war and the transatlantic slave trade, times when both national identity and the perceived human worth of the Kongolese people were called into question.

Kimpa Vita held a weekly rite of rebirth wherein she reenacted her reincarnation as Saint Anthony, ceremoniously dying each Friday and resurrecting each Saturday.

In addition, Kimpa Vita taught that her followers should lead lives of chastity, yet she would become pregnant three times. Two of these pregnancies she successfully aborted through the use of local medicine, yet her third pregnancy would come to fruition. This pregnancy was hidden from her followers and the child was never discovered by the Antonine Movement.

== Execution and its aftermath ==
Kimpa Vita was captured near her hometown by Kinlaza envoys who had heard the crying of her child. These envoys brought Kimpa Vita and João Barro before Pedro IV, where she was to be tried for heresy. Here, Kimpa Vita repented for her sins and asked that she be baptized. The Catholic Church denied her baptism, yet permitted her to be absolved through means of a holy confession. In 1706, Kimpa Vita was burned as a heretic. The execution was carried out at the temporary capital of Evululu by forces loyal to Pedro IV. She was tried under Kongo law as a witch and a heretic, with the consent and counsel of the Capuchin friars Bernardo da Gallo and Lorenzo da Lucca. Kimpa Vita's son, whom she wished to name António, was spared by Lorenzo da Lucca. Lorenzo denied her requested name, instead naming the child Jerónimo. Custody of Jerónimo was given to the church's officials.

The Anthonian prophetic movement outlasted her death. Her followers continued to believe that she was still alive, and it was only when Pedro IV's forces took São Salvador in 1709 that the political force of her movement was broken, and most of her former noble adherents renounced their beliefs and rejoined the Catholic church.

Pedro IV’s wife Hipolyta became a follower of Kimpa.

Some hint of the strength of her teaching may be glimpsed by the fact that eighteenth-century Kongo religious art often shows Jesus as an African, and that Saint Anthony, known as "Toni Malau", is very prominent in it. More recently, some see present-day Kimbanguism, Matswanism and Tokoïsme (Tokoism) as its successors. Traditions circulating in Mbanza Kongo (formerly São Salvador) in 2002 also place great significance in the role of Beatriz' mother as an inspiration for the 20th century prophet Simon Kimbangu and also as playing a role in its continuation, and in fact, her mother was present in the aftermath of her death.

== Statue ==
Historian Scholastique Dianzinga has praised the statue commemorating Kimpa Vita for expanding the representation of women on African public monuments.

== See also ==
- Romaine-la-Prophétesse

== Literature ==
- R. S. Basi, The Black Hand of God, themarked; 2009, ISBN 978-0-9841474-0-3
- António Custódio Gonçalves. La symbolisation politique: Le prophetisme Kongo au XVIIIe siècle. (Munich: Weltforum, 1980)
- John Thornton, The Kongolese Saint Anthony: Dona Beatriz Kimpa Vita and the Antonian Movement, 1684–1706,, Cambridge University Press; 1998, ISBN 0-521-59370-0
- Robert Harms, Africa in Global History with Sources; ISBN 978-0-393-92757-3
