= Manuel I of Kibangu =

Former ruler of Kibangu

Manuel Afonso Nzinga a Nlenke
- Mwene Kongo
- Reign: 1691 – September 1692
- Predecessor: Interregnum
- Successor: Pedro IV
- Died: 23 September 1692
- Dynasty: House of Kimpanzu

Manuel Afonso Nzinga a Nlenke (died 23 September 1692) was a ruler of Kibangu and was one of the two main Kinlaza claimants (along with the King of Lemba) to the throne of the Kingdom of Kongo during its civil war in the late-17th century. He ruled the Kingdom of Kibangu from 1685 to 1688 and the Kingdom of Kongo between 1691 and 1692.

== Reign in Kibangu (1685–88) ==
When Manuel Afonso ascended the throne of Kibangu, there were those who were opposed to his claim to the Kingdom of Kongo, and an internal struggle for the throne of Kibangu began. The leaders of those against Manuel Afonso's rule were two brothers of the Água Rosada house, the product of one Kinlaza parent, and one Kimpanzu parent. The brothers' faction was eventually successful in 1688, and the older of the two, Álvaro, gained the throne of Kibangu.

== Reign as ManiKongo (1691‐92) ==
He conquered São Salvador and ended the Interregnum in 1691, but his reign was short as he was deposed in 1692 and was executed in 23 September 1692.

Preceded by André I	Awenekongo of Kibangu; 1685—1688	Succeeded by Álvaro X
Preceded by André I	Manikongo (Kibangu Claimant); 1685—1688	Succeeded by Álvaro X
