= André I of Kibangu =

Central Africa king

André I Mvizi a Mkanga was a ruler of Kibangu and was one of the two main Kinlaza claimants to the throne of the Kingdom of Kongo during its civil war, the other being the King of Lemba. He ruled the Kingdom of Kibangu for a short period in 1685. His death marked the succession of Manuel Afonso which led to an internal struggle for power within Kibangu.

Preceded by Garcia III	Awenekongo of Kibangu; 1685	Succeeded by Manuel I
Preceded by Garcia III	Manikongo (Kibangu Claimant); 1685	Succeeded by Manuel I
