= Alfonso III =

Alfonso III (Spanish) or Afonso III (Portuguese) may refer to:

- Alfonso III of Asturias (866–910), surnamed "the Great"
- Afonso III of Portugal (1210–1279)
- Alfonso III of Aragon (1285–1291)
- Alfonso III d'Este, Duke of Modena and Reggio (1628–1644)
- Afonso III of Kongo (1666–1667)
