= Pedro III of Kongo =

Pedro III
- Mwene Kongo
- Reign: January – June 1669
- Predecessor: Álvaro VIII
- Successor: Álvaro IX
- Born: 1648
- Died: 1680 (aged 34/35)
- Dynasty: House of Kinlaza

Pedro III Nsimba Ntamba (1648–1680) was a ruler of the Kingdom of Kongo during its tumultuous civil war period. He was the elder brother of King Joāo II and one of many partisans of the House of Kinlaza. Since 1666, the two royal kandas, or lineages, Kinlaza and Kimpanzu, had been fighting bitterly over the Kingdom of Kongo.

== First rule ==
In 1669, Pedro III became King of Kongo. The Kongo Civil War had been well underway at this point, and the House of Kinlaza had chosen Pedro as its candidate. Though like many reigns during this period, his was short lived, lasting only until June 1669. He was then forced out of Kongo by the rival House of Kimpanzu, and fled to Lemba where he ruled in exile.

== Attempts to regain control ==
While in exile, Pedro III still had a large amount of supporters, and in 1674, his forces returned to the capital of Kongo, São Salvador (or M'banza-Kongo). He or his agents then killed his usurper, Alfonso III of Kongo. However he was again forced out of the capital. In 1676 Pedro III once again invaded the capital, but the forces of Estêvão II of Soyo drove him out.

== Sack of São Salvador ==
To advance his military standing, Pedro III began to recruit Yaka people as soldiers. These were mercenaries who had previously served Loanga and Great Makoko. Others of this group had been raiding Kongo for about 20 years, and were known to have practiced cannibalism.

In 1678, Pedro III returned to São Salvador with an army. At this point the capital was held by the Kimpanzu King Daniel I. In the ensuing battle, Pedro III killed Daniel I, and destroyed the city in the process. Afterwards, all claimants for the throne would reside in opposing mountain fortresses, namely Lemba, Kibangu, and Mbamba Luvota.

== Assassination ==
In 1680, King Pedro III was still ruling Lemba, where he claimed the Kongo throne in opposition to the House of Kimpanzu partisans residing in Soyo's southern province of Luvota. Manuel de Nóbrega, brother of the slain King Daniel, swore vengeance and orchestrated a plot to kill Pedro III. Under the auspice of a truce, treacherously negotiated by the Prince of Soyo, Pedro III was lured into a trap expecting to make peace through marriage to the sister of Antonio II Baretta da Silva, the ruler of Soyo. Instead, Pedro III was killed. Later, it was alleged that Manuel himself had emerged from the Soyo wedding train dressed as a bride, and shot Pedro III to death before escaping. Although this story is likely a myth. This particular episode in Kongo's history would become one of the sticking points keeping the nobility from finding lasting peace.

== See also ==
- List of Manikongos of Kongo

Preceded by Álvaro VIII	Manikongo; 1669	Succeeded by Álvaro IX
Preceded by Daniel I	Awenekongo of Lemba; 1669-1680	Succeeded by João II
Preceded by Daniel I	Manikongo (Lemba Claimant); 1678-1680	Succeeded by João II
