= Pintado =

Pintado means "painted" in Spanish and Portuguese and may refer to:

- Pintado petrel, also known as the Cape petrel, a seabird whose range includes Antarctica and New Zealand
- Spotted sorubim Pseudoplatystoma corruscans, a catfish-like species of South American rivers
- (less often:) tiger sorubim Pseudoplatystoma fasciatum, known as cachara throughout most of Brazil but as pintado in the Amazon region
- Cero Scomberomorus regalis, a large, spotted, mackerel-like fish, whose range includes the Florida coast and the West Indies, after which two USS Pintado ships were named
- USS Pintado (SS-387) (1943-1969), a Balao class-submarine named for the fish
- USS Pintado (SSN-672) (1967-1998), a Sturgeon-class attack submarine named for the fish
- Cerro Pintado, a mountain in South America
- A sombrero pintado, a style of Panama hat
- Pintados, used by Spanish colonists to describe indigenous people with tattooed bodies residing on the islands of Cebu, Bohol, Samar and Leyte in the Biçayas (Visayas) region of the Philippines

== People ==
- Álvaro Pintado (born 2004), Spanish technology entrepreneur
- Brian Pintado (born 1995), Ecuadorian racewalker
- Carlos Pintado (born 1974), Cuban–American writer, playwright and poet
- Enrique Pintado (born 1958), Uruguayan trade unionist and politician
- Gorka Pintado (born 1978), Spanish footballer
- Jesse Pintado (1969–2006), Mexican-American guitarist
- Juan Pintado (born 1997), Uruguayan footballer
- Luiz Carlos de Oliveira Preto, mostly known as Pintado, a Brazilian former footballer and manager.
