= Álvaro IV of Kongo =

Álvaro IV
- Manikongo
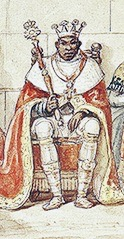
- Álvaro IV of Kongo
- Reign: 1631 to 1636
- Predecessor: Ambrósio I
- Successor: Álvaro V
- Died: 1636
- Dynasty: Kwilu dynasty
- Father: Álvaro III

Álvaro IV of Kongo, also known as Álvaro IV Nzinga a Nkuwu, was a ruler of the Kingdom of Kongo from 1631 to 1636.

The king was the last of the House of Kwilu monarchs which had ruled the kingdom with only one intermission since 1567. He was a son of Álvaro III and took possession of the throne at age thirteen. He came to power during a time of great strife in the kingdom, and if not for the intervention of future kings Álvaro VI and Garcia II, his reign might have been much shorter. Only five years after being placed on the throne, the duke of Mbamba Daniel da Silva, marched on the capital of São Salvador on the pretence of "protecting his nephew from outsiders". The king fled with his protectors where they fought a pitched battle against da Silva's forces at a swamp. The king's forces under the leadership of Lukeni family brothers Álvaro and Garcia were victorious, and Álvaro IV was placed back on the throne. In 1636, the king died of poison and Álvaro V, a cousin of the Lukeni brothers, took over the throne of the House of Kimpanzu.

== See also ==
- Kingdom of Kongo
- House of Kwilu

Preceded by Ambrósio I	Manikongo; 1631–1636	Succeeded by Álvaro V
