= Kanda (lineage) =

Kikongo term for a clan or lineage

Kanda (plural makanda; before 1700 the singular was dikanda or likanda) in Kikongo is any social or analytical group, but often applied to lineages or groups of associated people who form a faction, band or other group. In Kongo documents written in Portuguese, or in older Portuguese accounts of Kongo it often is translated as geração ('family' or 'lineage' in Portuguese).

== Historical usage ==
Before about 1850, the term probably referred to elite lineages (and their clients and slaves) who ruled the country. In modern Kikongo usage, for example in clan histories, or publications such as Nkutama a mvila za makanda, it refers to a matrilineal descent group. In this literature, kanda is often associated with a mvila or clan motto, in the form of a boast or other statement of identity, as well as a kinkulu, a history of the clan's migrations.

== Ruling kandas ==
Throughout its history the royal family had branching factions that fought each other over succession. Although these branches were probably called kanda, they were not strictly speaking descent groups, since they sometimes formed around two brothers. In the sixteenth century and later, the kingdom's kandas were referred to as houses, thus the Nlaza or Kinlaza kanda was also known as the House of Kinlaza.

The ruling kandas were fairly short-lived and unstable before the late seventeenth century, though houses were noted, such as the Nsaku, who ruled Mbata, or the Houses of Kwilu and Nsundi (both geographical rather than kin group names). In the early to mid-seventeenth century, however, the ruling kandas gradually hardened into permanent divisions. Three were recognized by tradition of the early eighteenth century, and included the Kinlaza, Kimpanzu and Kikanga a Mvika. Kikanga a Mvika was destroyed when its members sought to overthrow Garcia II (of the Kinlaza) in 1656–57/ The other two became permanent contestants over the throne, named in documents throughout the eighteenth centuries. In a few places the identification with these kandas continued in tradition into the twentieth century, but for the most part in the nineteenth century they splintered.

Other potential kandas (though the term was not used for them) include some families who bore Portuguese surnames and passed their names patrilinearly. For example, the da Silvas, de Castros and combinations of these two ruled in Mbamba and then in Soyo from the early seventeenth century, while the Agua Rosadas emerged in the late seventeenth century from descendants of the Kimpanzu and Kinlasa (Pedro IV and his brothers were the first representatives of this kanda). Eighteenth century sources indicated that de Leão, a kin group founded by Queen Ana Afonso de Leão and her nephews, continued as a permanent group, as did later-emerging groups such as Romano Leite. It is unclear how these named groups worked in the system of kinship and descent defined by kandas, which were larger and more flexible.

== See also ==
- Kingdom of Kongo
- Kinlaza
- Kimpanzu
- Kinkanga
- Soyo
