= Mbwila Rebellion of 1691–1693 =

Mbwila Rebellion (1691–1693)
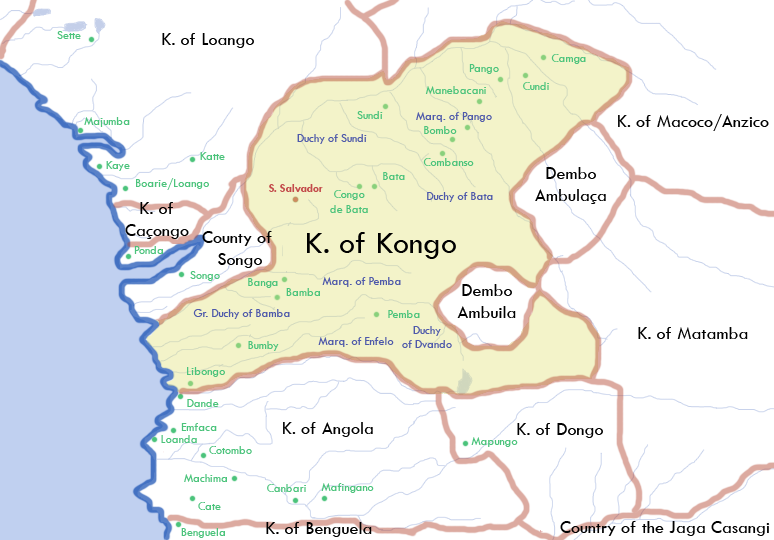
- Map of the Kingdom of Kongo
Date	1691–1693
Location	Mbwila (in present day Angola)
Result	Portuguese victory

Belligerents
Kingdom of Portugal	Kingdom of Kongo; Mbwila; Ndembu

Commanders and leaders
Unnamed commander †; Pascoal Rodrigues	Sebastião Afonso of Mbwila

Strength
800 gunmen 40,000 archers	Unknown

Casualties and losses
Unknown	Unknown

The Mbwila Rebellion of 1691–1693 was a conflict between the Ndembu forces of Mbwila, led by Sebastião Afonso, and Portuguese colonial authorities from 1691 to 1693 in Angola. The rebellion saw early Ndembu successes before being suppressed by a Portuguese counteroffensive, which devastated the region and reasserted Portuguese control.

== Background ==
In the late 17th century, the Kingdom of Kongo was weakening due to internal divisions and the growing influence of Portuguese colonial power in Angola. Mbwila, a province within Kongo, was traditionally a vassal of the Portuguese, but tensions began to rise as Portuguese expansionism clashed with the independence movements in the region.

== Rebellion ==
=== Expulsion of the Portuguese, 1691 ===
By 1691, Sebastião Afonso, the ruler of Mbwila, declared his allegiance to Congo and Queen Njinga of Matamba, distancing himself from Portuguese rule. Sebastião expelled the Portuguese captain-major and chaplain, who had been stationed in Mbwila, he burned a church and blocked trading routes.

=== First battle, 1691 ===
The Portuguese organized a campaign to crush the rebellion. A force of 800 gunmen and 40,000 archers, composed of Portuguese soldiers and their African allies, invaded Mbwila. They sacked local villages and attempted to subdue the region. However, the rebels survived, and despite the initial strength of the Portuguese force, heavy rains and the outbreak of tropical diseases weakened the Portuguese, suffering significant losses, along with the commander while they were camped in Camolemba.

=== Second battle, 1692–1693 ===
By 1692/1693, the Portuguese regrouped and launched a counteroffensive under Pascoal Rodrigues. The Portuguese attacked with overwhelming force, devastating the region. By 1693, the Portuguese had defeated the rebellion, forcing Mbwila back into submission and reestablishing its vassalage to Portugal.

== Aftermath ==
The Portuguese forces, after crushing the Mbwila rebellion, forced the Ndembu to renew their vassalage to Portugal.
