= Álvaro X of Kibangu =

Álvaro X Nimi a Mvemba Água Rosada was a ruler of Kibangu and was the first Água Rosada claimant to the throne of the Kingdom of Kongo during its civil war. He ruled the Kingdom of Kibangu from 1688 to 1695.

== Rule ==
During the reign of the previous King of Kibangu, Álvaro and his brother led a faction that was unsatisfied by his rule. They managed to overthrow Manuel I in 1688 and Álvaro took the throne. During his reign, the king was able to keep the forces of the other two claimants to the Kingdom of Kongo at bay. The king was the first civil war claimant to Kongo to be of the Água Rosada house where there was a parent from each of the main houses of Kinlaza and Kimpanzu. This was not a real house at the time of Álvaro's rule, and was only after his death in 1695 when his successor, Pedro IV formed it as a house to end the civil war and reform the Kingdom of Kongo.

Preceded by Manuel I	Awenekongo of Kibangu; 1688—1695	Succeeded by Pedro IV

Preceded by Manuel I	Manikongo (Kibangu Claimant); 1688—1695	Succeeded by Pedro IV
