= João II of Lemba =

Historical Congolese ruler

João II Nzuzi a Ntamba was a ruler of Lemba and was one of the main Kinlaza claimants to the throne of the Kingdom of Kongo during its civil war, the other being the King of Kibangu. He ruled the Kingdom of Lemba from 1680 to 1716.

== Rule ==
After the assassination of Pedro III by the King of Mbamba Lovata, Manuel de Nóbrega, João was the next in line, as his younger brother. Once he ascended to the throne of Lemba, João worked tirelessly to try to bring the other Kinlaza stronghold kingdom of Kibangu under his rule as well, but never this was never achieved. After the members of the Antonianism religious sect were defeated in the Battle of São Salvador, they fled to Lemba and attempted to gain the support of João. As Pedro IV had recently re-established himself as the King of Kongo by conquering São Salvador, João declined to recognise him and continued his claim to the kingdom and decided to march his armies down to face King Pedro. This culminated in the Battle of Mbula on October 4, 1709, ending in a victory for Pedro. João retreated back to Lemba after the battle and this left Pedro as the de facto Manikongo, despite João never dropping his claim until his death in 1716, when the Kingdom of Lemba came back into Kongo.

Preceded by Pedro III	Awenekongo of Lemba; 1680—1716	Succeeded by N/A
Preceded by Pedro III	Manikongo (Lemba Claimant); 1680—1716	Succeeded by Pedro IV
