= Álvaro García =

Álvaro García may refer to:

- Alvaro García (sport shooter) (1894–1983), Mexican Olympic shooter
- Álvaro García Rodríguez (born 1961), Uruguayan economist and politician
- Álvaro García Linera (born 1962), Bolivian politician
- Álvaro García Ortiz, Spanish jurist and attorney general
- Álvaro García (footballer, born 1986), Spanish footballer
- Álvaro García (footballer, born 1984), Uruguayan footballer for Tacuary
- Álvaro García (footballer, born 1992), Spanish footballer
- Álvaro García (footballer, born 2000), Spanish footballer
- Álvaro García (rugby union) (born 2003), Spanish rugby union player with the Spain national team
