= Álvar Enciso =

Spanish rugby union player

- Born: Álvar Enciso Fernández-Valderrama; February 27, 1974 (age 52) Valladolid, Spain
- Height: 5 ft 11 in (1.80 m)
- Weight: 188 lb (85 kg)
- Notable relative(s): Alfonso Enciso Recio (father); Pilar Fernández Valderrama (mother)
- Occupation: Architect

Rugby union career
- Position: Centre
Senior career
Years	Team	Apps	(Points)
1992-2007	CR El Salvador		
International career
Years	Team	Apps	(Points)
1993-2006	Spain	70	(40)

Álvar Enciso Fernandez-Valderrama (born February 27, 1974, in Valladolid) is a Spanish rugby union player. He plays as a centre. His nickname was Fortukin. During his career, he was captain of CR El Salvador.

== Career ==
His first international cap was during a match against Switzerland, at Lisbon, on May 11, 1993. He was part of the 1999 Rugby World Cup roster, playing two matches of the tournament. His last international cap was during a match against Georgia, at Tbilisi, on October 28, 2006. Between 1995 and 2001 he also played for Spain sevens.

== Personal life ==
He is son of Pilar Fernández Valderrama, a former Spanish track and field athlete. He practised track and field during his childhood. He works as an architect and has four sons.
