= Álvaro VII of Kongo =

Álvaro VII
- Mwene Kongo
- Reign: December 1665 – June 1666
- Predecessor: Afonso II of Kongo and Nkondo
- Successor: Álvaro VIII
- Born: 1631
- Died: June 1666 (aged 34–35)

Álvaro VII (Mpanzu-a-Mabondo) (1631 – June 1666) was king of the Kingdom of Kongo from 1665 to 1666.

When the death of Antonio I at the Battle of Mbwila (October 29, 1665) was announced, Álvaro, a relative of the dead sovereign and a member of the Kinlaza lineage, was proclaimed king.

The new king sent a trusted Capuchin, Friar Girolamo of Montesarchio, to make peace with the Portuguese in to Luanda, Angola, in Christmas 1665. But the friar was waylaid by a rebellion in Mbamba, and only returned to the capital in June 1666, where he found Álvaro VII already dead; in the meantime, the powerful Count of Soyo, Paulo da Silva, had marched on São Salvador (the capital of the kingdom), killed the king and proclaimed Álvaro VIII in his place.

== See also ==
- List of Manikongo of Kongo
- Kingdom of Kongo

Preceded by Afonso II	Manikongo; 1665–1666	Succeeded by Álvaro VIII
