= António I of Kongo =

Ruler of the Kingdom of Kongo from 1661 to 1665

António Vita a Nkanga
- Mwene Kongo
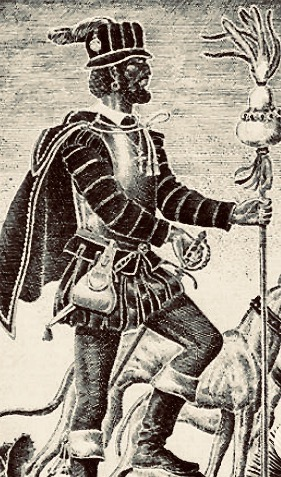
- António I Kongo

Manikongo of the Kingdom of Kongo
- Reign: 1661–1665
- Predecessor: Garcia II of Kongo
- Successor: Afonso II of Kongo and Nkondo
- Born: António Vita a Nkanga; 1617; Mbanza Kongo
- Died: 1665 (aged 47–48); Mbwila or Mbuila
- Burial: Luanda
- Issue: Dom Francisco de Menezes Nkanka a Makaya
- Dynasty: Nlaza kanda
- Religion: Roman Catholicism

António I Vita a Nkanga (or Mvita a Nkanga) was a mwenekongo of the Kingdom of Kongo who ruled from 1661 to his defeat and death at the Battle of Mbwila on October 29, 1665. He was elected following the death of King Garcia II. Like the former king, António I pursued a foreign policy focused on removing the Portuguese from his region.

== Policy against the Portuguese ==
Since 1620, Kongo and Portugal had been in a near-constant state of war with the only intervals coming after decisive BaKongo victories. After almost 30 years of decline in the face of BaKongo, Mbundu and Dutch military victories, the Portuguese had retaken their colonial possession in Luanda while establishing a tenuous peace with their old enemies. Feeling threatened by Portugal's return on Kongo's southern border, António I sought to renew Kongo's war against the Portuguese with a new alliance similar to the one at the Battle of Kitombo. Unable to rely on the Dutch for assistance, he sent emissaries to Spain but failed to procure an alliance. He also contacted Kongo's Mbundu allies in Matamba and the semi-independent kingdoms of Dembos and Mbwila.

On December 22, 1663, Alfonso VI of Portugal ordered Vidal Negreiros to take control of the Kongo copper mines, exploit the deposits and send the ore by ship to Lisbon. António I of Kongo responded by denying the existence of the mines and proclaiming that he "is in no way indebted to the King of Portugal". Vidal Negreiros prepares his army for battle and Antonio I responds with a vibrant call to war, the two met in Mbwila, along the Ulanga River.

== Death at the Battle of Mbwila ==
The Portuguese got wind of these plans and were also pressing claims to sovereignty over the small kingdom of Mbwila. When a succession dispute between Mbwila's king (supported by Kongo) and his aunt (supported by Portugal) erupted, the rivals both came with armies to settle the dispute. At the Battle of Mbwila, the BaKongo suffered their worst military defeat. This resulted in the death of hundreds, including King António who had led a contingent of 400 swordsmen into the battle. King António I was decapitated during or shortly after the battle (his head buried with royal honours by the Portuguese), while his crown and sceptre were taken to Portugal as trophies.

== Aftermath ==
King António died with no heir apparent. Many of the men who could have taken his place died or were captured at the battle, including his seven-year-old son. The ruling House of Kinlaza and the opposing House of Kimpanzu fought furiously over the throne causing a devastating civil war. The heyday of the Kingdom of Kongo was at an end, and it would take forty years for the kingdom to be reunited.

== See also ==
- Kingdom of Kongo
- Battle of Mbwila
- House of Kinlaza
- Angolan Wars

| Preceded by Garcia II | Manikongo; 1661–1665 | Succeeded by Afonso II |

== Bibliography ==
- Thornton, John K. (2020). The Kongolese Saint Anthony : Dona Beatriz Kimpa Vita and the Antonian Movement, 1684–1706. Cambridge: Cambridge University Press.
- Mateso, Bruce (2024). Le royaume Kongo sous Vita Nkanga : les fondements de la maison royale Ki-Nlaza 1636-1665. La Loupe, N'Tamo (Brazzaville). Paris: Paari éditeur (in French).
