= Vungu =

Historic state in Mayombe

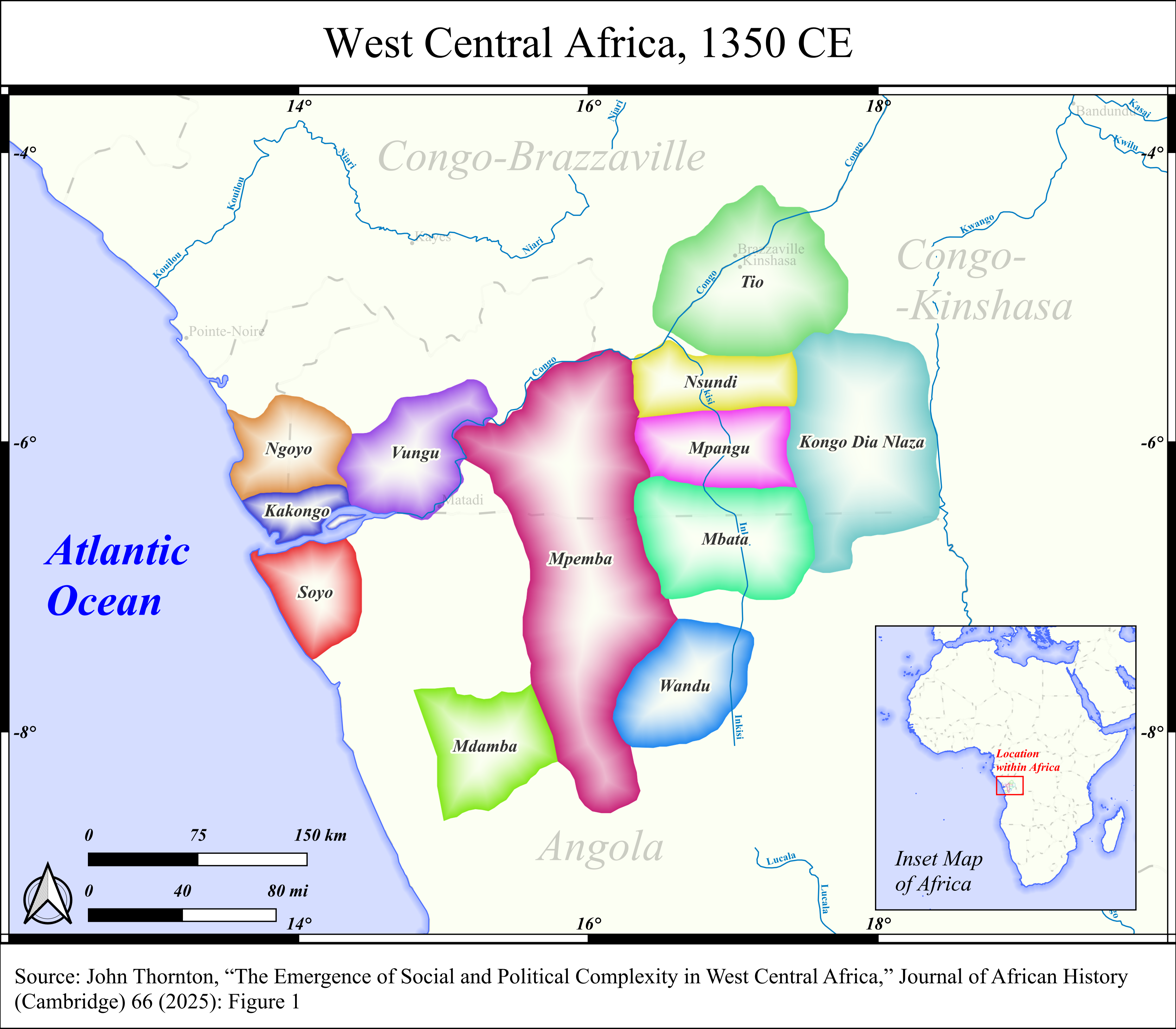
States of the western Congo Basin, c. 1350

The kingdom of Vungu or Bungu was a historic state located in Mayombe (between the present-day Republic of Congo and the present-day Democratic Republic of Congo). In the 13th century it led a confederation of itself, Ngoyo, and Kakongo. It neighboured the confederations of Mpemba and Seven Kingdoms of Kongo dia Nlaza. It is thought to be the origin of the Kingdom of Kongo.

== History ==
It is not known for sure how old Vungu was or when it was founded. The first documentary mention of it comes in a letter written by Afonso I, the king of Kongo in 1535, in which he lists "JBungu" among other places over which he ruled as king. Traditions collected in the Kongo court and written up by the Jesuit priest Mateus Cardoso in 1624 cite "Bungu" as the place where the first king of Kongo ruled before crossing the Congo River to conquer Kongo. By the 1620s after the Jaga were expelled from Kongo, they had moved north, allied Loango, and occupied Vungu.
