= Álvaro Zamith =

Brazilian sports administrator

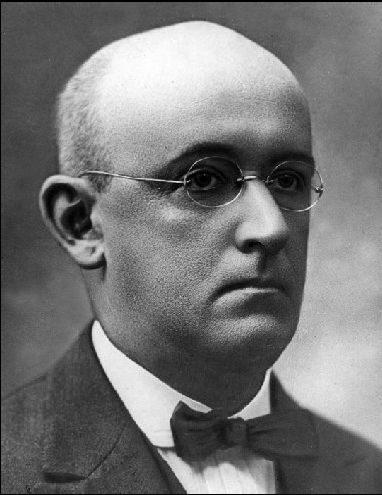

President of CBF
- In office 20 November 1915 – 4 November 1916
- Succeeded by: Arnaldo Guinle

Álvaro Zamith was a Brazilian sports administrator, who was the first president of the Brazilian Football Confederation, then called CBD (Confederação Brasileira de Desportos, or Brazilian Sports Confederation), from 20 November 1915 until 4 November 1916.
