= Álvaro VIII of Kongo =

King of the Kingdom of Congo

Álvaro VIII
- Mwene Kongo
- Reign: June 1666 to January 1669
- Predecessor: Álvaro VII
- Successor: Pedro III
- Born: 1630
- Died: January 1669 (aged 38/39)
- Dynasty: House of Kinlaza

Alvaro VIII (Mvemba a Mpanzu; 1630 – June 1669), of the House of Kinlaza, was king of the Kingdom of Kongo, from 1666 to 1669.

He was elevated to the throne by Paulo da Silva, Count of Soyo, who marched on São Salvador and killed his predecessor, King Alvaro VII.

In 1667, he sent his ambassador, Anastasius, to Luanda (Angola), to negotiate a treaty that ceded to the Portugueses the right to exploit the mines of Kongo, located in the provinces of Mbamba and Mpemba. Theodosius, Duke of Mbamba, bowed to the king's decision, but Pedro III of Kongo, refused.

Leading a small army, Peter attacked Mbamba, killed Theodosius and then invaded the kingdom's capital, São Salvador, killing Alvaro VIII and proclaimed himself king under the name of Peter III.

| Preceded by Álvaro VII | Manikongo; 1666–1669 | Succeeded by Pedro III |

== See also ==
- List of Manikongo of Kongo
- Kingdom of Kongo
- House of Kinlaza
