= Mbwila =

Mbwila (Ambuíla in Portuguese) was a small state located in what is modern-day Angola. Its rulers, like those of the surrounding areas, bore the title Ndembu, and for that reason the region was often known in Portuguese as Dembos, while Mbwila was known as Dembo Ambuíla.

The origins of the polity are unknown, and it is first mentioned only in the early seventeenth century. Mbwila was located at the headwaters of the Lukala River, where there was a gap in the mountains that separated Kongo and Ndongo and controlled the trading route that passed between Kongo and Ndongo. As such, it was of great strategic significance in the history of Angola, especially after 1550.

Mbwila's capital was located in the rugged mountains above the valley and was very difficult to attack, as a result the country was often claimed by either Kongo or Ndongo, but rarely successfully governed by either one. In 1619–20, Portuguese forces from the colony of Angola, founded in 1575, attacked Mbwila and forced its ruler to sign an act of vassalage, thus placing Mbwila in the intersection of three powers: Kongo, Ndongo, and Portugal.

In spite of this new apparent loss of sovereignty, Mbwila was not obedient to Portugal and routinely played off the larger powers against each other. In 1627–30, when the Portuguese were seeking to subdue the forces of Queen Njinga of Ndongo, Mbwila sometimes swore loyalty to her, other times to Kongo.

Mbwila was sufficiently strong in this period in that it sometimes led regional coalitions of other Dembo rulers, and its strategic position made it constantly the subject of contestation. Mbwila was subject to important Portuguese attacks in 1635–40, but when the Dutch took over Luanda in 1641, the country threw its loyalty to Queen Njinga, who moved her headquarters to Kavanga, south of the country that year.

Following the expulsion of the Dutch in 1648, Portuguese officials again focused their attention on Mbwila, placing pressure on its rulers in order to renew their vassalage to Portugal. Nevertheless, Portugal relinquished Mbwila in favor of Kongo in exchange for a mining concession in the same region. King António I however refused provide access to mines.

In late 1664, a succession dispute broke out in the Dembos and king António evicted the regent of Ambuíla Dona Isabel along with its lord, both of whom then turned to the Portuguese for aid in recovering their territory. They provided Luanda with letters revealing that António was preparing to block roads and instigate a revolt in Portuguese Angola. Subsequently, governor André Vidal de Negreiros declared war on Kongo and sent an army down to take Mbwila. Antonio's army met the Portuguese force at the famous Battle of Mbwila on October 29, 1665, and António was defeated.

Although Isabel renewed her vassalage in the aftermath of the battle, by the 1680s, Mbwila was again building a regional power, sometimes in cooperation with Matamba's powerful Queen Verónica I. Portugal sent another major army to attack Mbwila and reassert its vassalage in 1692–3. Once again, the war resulted in a short-term Portuguese renewal of vassalage.

Portuguese governors continued to express concern that trade, especially the slave trade, that might pass through Luanda and pay taxes to Portugal were instead being diverted through the Lukala gap and Mbwila's territory, to Kongo and from there to Dutch, French and English merchants who operated on the coast north of Kongo.

After a number of unsuccessful attempts, the Portuguese built a fort at Encoge, not far to the south of Mbwila in an attempt to control the trade in 1758.

== See also ==
- Angolan Wars

== Sources ==
- Graziano Saccardo, Congo e Angola con la storia dell'antica missione dei Cappuccini (3 vols., Venice, 1982–3)
