= Pedro IV of Kongo =

Ruler of the Kingdom of Kongo from 1695 to 1718

- Mwene Kongo
- Reign: December 1, 1695 to February 21, 1718
- Predecessor: Álvaro X
- Successor: Manuel II
- Born: 1666
- Died: February 21, 1718 (52 years old); São Salvador
- Dynasty: Água Rosada

Pedro IV Nusamu a Mvemba. King of Kongo, ruled from 1695 to 1718, although his effective reign of Kongo was only from 1709. He is noted for restoring the country and ending the civil war that had raged since 1666. The career of Beatriz Kimpa Vita, the prophetess claimed to be possessed by Saint Anthony, took place during his reign.

== Early life ==
Very little is known of Pedro's early life, although he was the founder of the House of Água Rosada which was a lineage founded from the two rival lineages of the late 17th century, the Kimpanzu and the Kinlaza. He began his career among royal refugees who had taken shelter in the mountain of Kibangu, in the Serra do Canda of modern-day Angola. He claimed the throne upon the death of his brother, but as he was not crowned in São Salvador, he was not considered fully legitimate.

== Reign ==
He was also a partner in several attempts to organize a peaceful settlement to the succession crisis in Kongo brokered by the old Queen Ana Afonso de Leão with the special cooperation of the Capuchin missionary Francesco da Pavia. The concerts did not result in success however as bad blood remained among all the contenders.

Popular discontent with the king rose in the early eighteenth century, for many felt he had not done enough to restore the kingdom by reoccupying the capital, and to this end Pedro led an armed column from Kibangu to São Salvador in 1694 and was crowned there by a priest. But he was threatened immediately by his principal rival, João II of Lemba, who also claimed to be king, and withdrew immediately. He would remain in the mountain for many more years. After 1700, Pedro sought to reoccupy the ancient capital by sending out groups of colonists, one set led by Manuel Cruz Barbosa, his majordomo, and the other by Pedro Constaninho da Silva (known also as Kibenga), a one-time rival who had temporarily joined forces with him. Pedro himself moved down from Kibangu to a smaller mountain, Evululu, nearer to the capital.

== The Antonian Movement ==
There were millennial stirrings among the colonists that had been sent out to resettle the capital. Several prophets emerged, but the final prophet, Beatriz Kimpa Vita, became immensely popular. Claiming to be possessed by Saint Anthony, Beatriz confronted Pedro on his lack of resolution, and he for his part wished to arrest her as a heretic, as the Capuchin priest in his service, Bernardo da Gallo, recommended. However, he did not, and Beatriz left his capital, and eventually began resettling São Salvador herself. In the process she gained the adherence of Pedro Constantinho da Silva, thus setting up a crisis between Pedro IV and his one-time subordinate.

Pedro IV captured Beatriz near his capital at Evululu, and in July 1706 had her executed. In 1709 in turn, he occupied São Salvador, defeating the final partisans of Pedro Constantinho da Silva. In the same year he won a signal victory over João II, thus securing himself the position as king.

According to later accounts, before his death in 1718, Pedro declared that the kingship in Kongo should rotate between the rival lineages.

Regnal titles
Preceded by Álvaro X	Awenekongo of Kibangu; 1695–1709	Succeeded by N/A
Preceded by Álvaro X	Manikongo (Kibangu Claimant); 1695–1709	Succeeded by Regained Kingdom
Preceded by Daniel I	Manikongo; 1709–1718	Succeeded by Manuel II
