= Antonianism =

Syncretic Bakongo Catholic movement

Antonianism Antonine sect
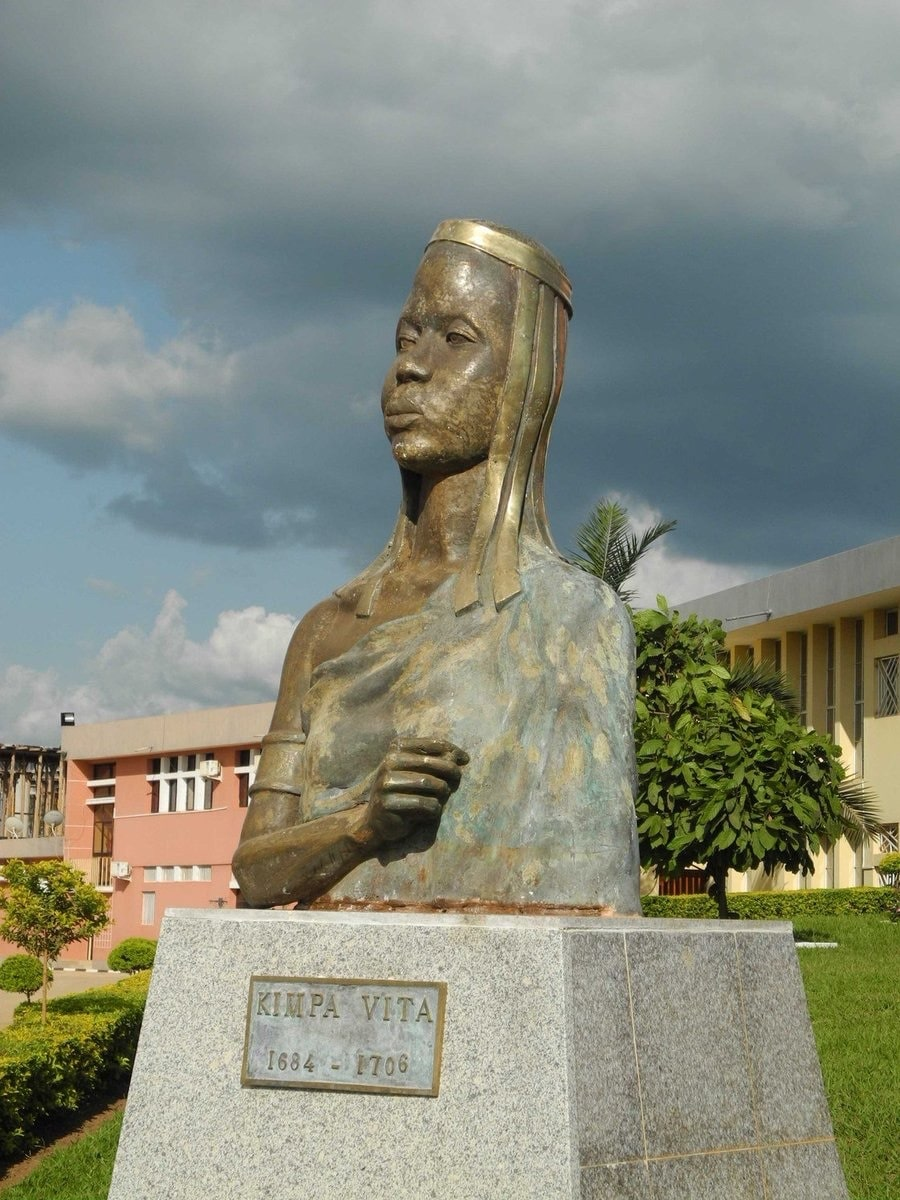
- Kimpa Vita's statue in Angola
- Type: Syncretic Bakongo Catholic movement
- Region: Kingdom of Kongo
- Founder: Beatriz Kimpa Vita
- Origin: 1704
- Defunct: 1708
- Members: 20,000

Antonianism, or Antonine sect (Portuguese: Antonianismo), was a syncretic Bakongo Catholic movement formed in the Kingdom of Kongo between 1704 and 1708, as a development out of the Catholic Church in Kongo, yet without denying the authority of the Pope. Its founder was a young charismatic woman named Beatriz Kimpa Vita, who said she was possessed by Saint Anthony of Padua. Beatriz became known for healing and other miracles. It was eventually suppressed by King Pedro IV of Kongo, and Dona Beatriz was burned at the stake as a heretic.

== Origins ==
Dona Beatriz (the Baptismal name of Kimpa Vita) was a young indigenous noblewoman born around 1684 in the Kongo. The Kingdom of Kongo was the largest and most powerful kingdom in Central Africa, but its influence was waning; during the 17th century, Portugal became the region's dominant military and economic force. The Portuguese had begun converting the people of the Kongo to Catholicism as early as the 15th century. The nobility of the Kongo and the commoners both practised Catholicism.

Roman Catholicism had been introduced to Sub-Saharan Africa in the 15th century and had attracted a wide following in Kongo. Beatriz claimed Anthony had told her through a vision to create a new Kongolese Catholicism, and she incorporated various native practices and traditions into her movement. The major differences between Roman Catholicism and Antonianism were the rejection of the cross, as it was seen as being responsible for Christ's death, as well as the rejection of baptism, confession and prayer. Among her beliefs were that Jesus was a black man and that the Kongo was the real home of Christianity. She also held that heaven was for Africans.

After an illness in 1704, Dona Beatriz began to preach that she had been possessed by St. Anthony of Padua, who was a major Portuguese saint.

== Teachings ==
Dona Beatriz "was trained as an nganga marinda, an individual who consults the supernatural world to solve problems within the community", and acted as a medium, speaking the pronouncements of St. Anthony. The teachings were a mixture of Kongo religious rituals, nativism, and Catholicism:

According to this vision, Jesus was born in Mbanza Kongo and baptized not at Nazareth but in the northern province of Nsundi, while Mary's mother was a slave of the Kongo nobleman Nzimba Mpangi. Dona Beatriz also disclosed new versions of the Ave Maria and Salve Regina that were more relevant to Kongolese modes of thought.

Dona Beatriz prophesied a new golden age to her followers, one that would follow the end of European presence in the Kongo. European treasures would be found around the Kongo capital city of Mbanza Kongo by her followers, and trees would turn to silver and gold. Dona Beatriz acknowledged papal authority, yet her cult was hostile to European missionaries, teaching that they were "corrupt and unsympathetic to the spiritual needs of Kongolese Catholics".

== Political activities and suppression ==
The Antonians, led by Dona Beatriz, occupied the territory of Mbanza Kongo. It served as a base for Antonian missionaries, who were sent by Dona Beatriz to convert followers to her movement, and "to urge rulers of the divided Kongo territories to unite under one king". She aimed to end the civil wars that had plagued the kingdom since the arrival of the Portuguese. Dona Beatriz' political influence was a threat to Pedro IV and the Portuguese administration that supported him. In 1706, Pedro IV had Dona Beatriz arrested and burned at the stake for heresy, under the urging of Portuguese Capuchin monks. The movement of Antonianism did not immediately die when she did and in 1708 twenty thousand Antonians marched on King Pedro IV, who eventually defeated them and restored his kingdom.

Although the movement had a short life under the leadership of Dona Beatriz, artifacts have survived, including St. Anthony figurines made of "ivory, brass, and wood ... affixed to crosses, used as staff finials, and worn as pendants.... these images, called Toni Malau or "Anthony of good fortune" in KiKongo, served to guard their bearers against illness and other misfortunes".
