= Álvaro Pintado =

Spanish businessman (born 2004)

- Born: Álvaro María Pintado Santaularia; 3 July 2004 (age 22); Sant Cugat del Vallès, Catalonia, Spain
- Education: Viaró Global School, Universitat Politècnica de Catalunya (dropped out)
- Occupation: Businessman
- Years active: 2020–present

Álvaro Pintado Santaularia (born 3 July 2004) is a Spanish technology entrepreneur and businessman. He is the founder and CEO of hello.app, a company which he founded at the age of 17. He is the author of El Sistema Financiero Descentralizado, a book about DeFi and how the decentralized financial system could replace the traditional one. He has also recently been accused of fraud and deceiving his investors.

== Education and career ==
Álvaro Pintado was born in Sant Cugat del Vallès, Spain. He studied at Viaró Global School, a Catholic boys' institution in his hometown. Afterwards, he went to UPC (Universitat Politècnica de Catalunya) to study Telecommunications Engineering, but dropped out after 3 months to focus on his entrepreneurship career.

In 2022, he wrote the book El Sistema Financiero Descentralizado and founded hello.app, a company that has since raised over $800,000 in funding from investors such as Esade, IESE Business School, and Bcombinator, among others. Esade and IESE Business School denied that such an investment had taken place.

Its latest valuation was $16 million.

hello.app is a decentralized storage network based on blockchain and distributed databases. The concept is to use mobile devices to act as microservers, reducing reliance on large server farms owned by a few companies. Currently, hello.app has over 100,000 beta users across more than 200 countries.

Pintado is also credited with one of the most expensive domain name purchases in Spain, having acquired www.hello.app for $115,000.

== Controversies ==
In April 2025, Álvaro Pintado became the subject of controversy following his sudden disappearance from social media and digital platforms, which sparked speculation among the media and his followers. Shortly thereafter, at least one of his former investors filed a formal complaint alleging fraud, according to report by La Razón.

The case quickly gained traction on social media, where thousands discussed and speculated about Pintado's disappearance. It even drew the attention of a well-known Spanish streamer, who published an in-depth video sharing his analysis and opinion on the case and on Pintado's business practices.

On Tuesday, 17 June, Álvaro Pintado made his only public appearance to date to address the controversy, giving an interview on live television on TardeAR (Telecinco), where he denied the accusations against him. However, as this remains solely his version of events, many questions have yet to be clarified, and investigations are still ongoing.

== Businesses ==
- The Watch Paradise
- MineBit (import of Bitcoin mining machines)
- Whispr (whispr.chat)
- hello.app
