= Afonso III of Kongo =

Afonso III
- Mwene Kongo
- Reign: Mid 1673 – Mid 1674
- Predecessor: Rafael I
- Successor: Daniel I
- Marquisate of Nkondo: 1669 – Mid 1673
- Died: Mid 1674
- Dynasty: House of Kimpanzu

Afonso III Mvemba a Nimi (also spelt Affonso III; died 1674) was a ruler of the kingdom of Kongo during its civil war period.

King Afonso III first enters written record as the ruler of the Marquisate of Nkondo. He governed that area from late 1669 until mid-1673. After which, he claimed the throne of divided Kongo. His reign was short and lasted only until the middle of 1674.

== See also ==
- Kingdom of Kongo
- List of Manikongos of Kongo

Preceded by Rafael I	Manikongo; 1673–1674	Succeeded by Daniel I
