= Kakongo =

13th to 19th century coastal kingdom in west Central Africa

Kingdom of Kakongo
- pre 13th century–1885
- Royal banner (c. 1883)

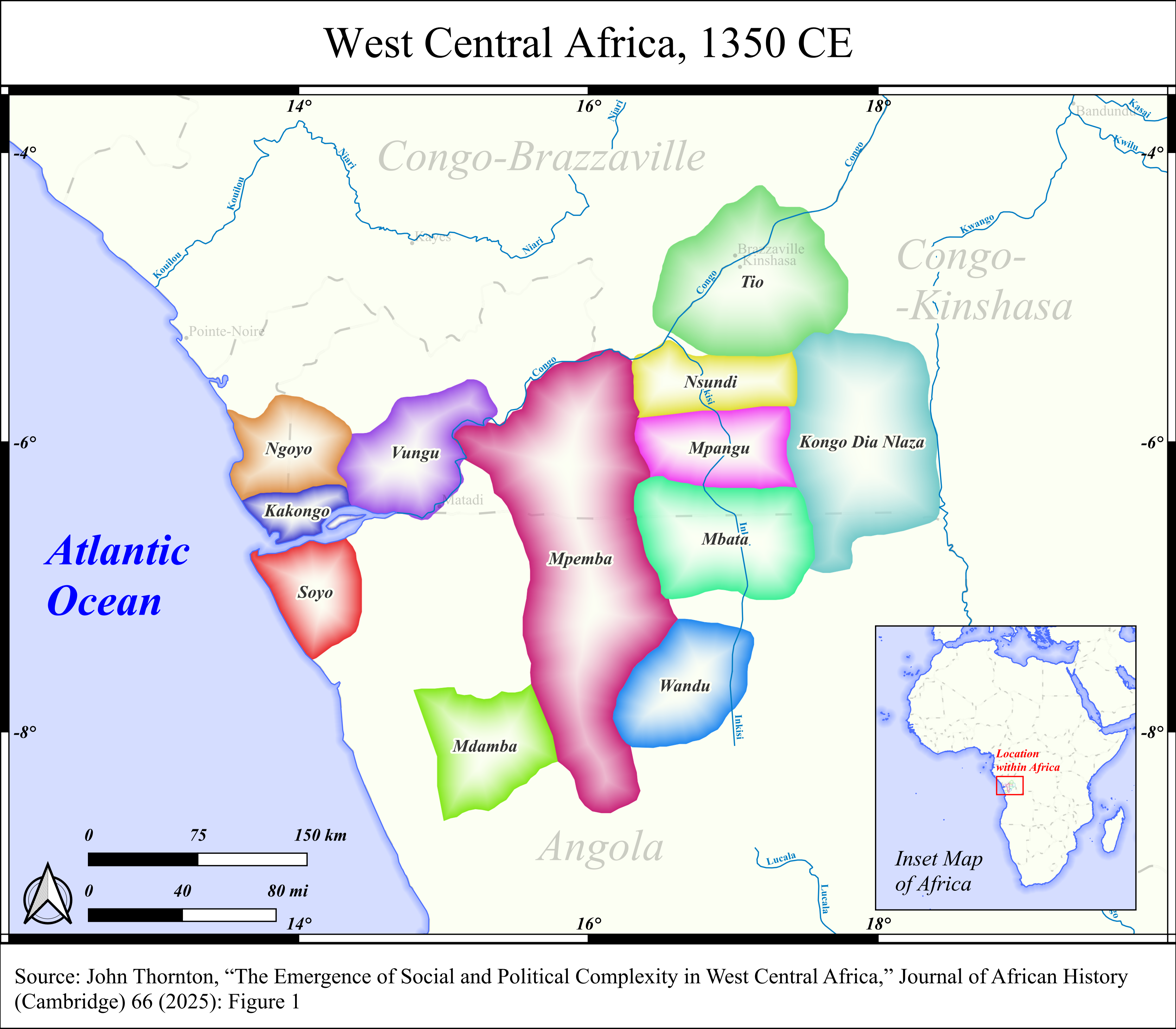
- States of the western Congo Basin, including Kakongo, c. 1350
- Capital: Kinguele
- Common languages: Kikongo
- Religion: Bakongo
- Government: Monarchy
- History
  - Established: pre 13th century
  - Coast occupied by Portugal: 1883
  - Incorporated into Portuguese Angola: 1885
Preceded by	Succeeded by
Vungu	Portuguese Angola

Kakongo was a small kingdom located on the Atlantic coast of Central Africa, in the modern-day Republic of the Congo and Cabinda Province, Angola. In the 13th century, it formed part of a confederation led by Vungu. Along with its neighboring kingdoms of Ngoyo and Loango, Kakongo became an important political commercial center during the 17th through 19th centuries. The people speak a dialect of the Kikongo language and thus may be considered a part of the Bakongo ethnicity. Kakongo was a vassal of the Kingdom of Kongo for a part of its history.

== Early history ==
The earliest history of Kakongo is unknown, and oral traditions collected in the region in the 19th and 20th centuries do not do much to elucidate. In its present state, archaeology can only attest that the region was already in the Iron Age by the 5th century BC, and that complex societies were emerging in the general vicinity by the early centuries CE.

The kingdom is first mentioned in the titles of the King of Kongo Afonso I in 1535, in which he notes that he was king over this region, as well as a number of others located along the north bank of the Congo River. This title has led historians to believe that Kakongo was once part of a federation of states that included Kongo and that may have formed around the late 14th century. Kakongo was, however, an independent state for all intents and purposes from the 16th century onward. Portuguese merchants, interested in the trade in copper, ivory, and slaves, began to establish factories in Kakongo in the 1620s, and Dutch and English merchants also visited the kingdom during the 17th century. Its capital was called Kinguele and was an inland town.

In the 1680s Kakongo had diplomatic relations with Soyo on the south side of the Congo River. It lost control of the island of Nzari a Kongo in the river to Soyo in about 1688.

== Commercial center ==
Kakongo became a very important commercial center in the 18th century, regularly visited by ships from England, France, the Netherlands, and Portugal. Its port of Cabinda was a major hub that lay in a protected bay. Slaves dominated the exports of the country, though most were simply transhipped from areas further south, mostly from the Kingdom of Kongo and the eastern provinces of Angola, such as Matamba.

Important goods that were also traded included gunpowder, guns, knives, cotton cloths, glass beads, copper and iron bars. In 1775, French missionaries sought to convert the kingdom, along with its neighbors, to Christianity, hoping to reap the fruit of its long association with the neighboring, Christian, Kingdom of Kongo. The mission was largely unsuccessful but did make contact with a community of Christians from Kongo's province of Soyo, living in the town of Manguenzo in the interior. The mission was ultimately abandoned.
