= Álvaro VI of Kongo =

Álvaro VI
- Manikongo
- Reign: 1636 - 1641
- Predecessor: Álvaro V
- Successor: Garcia II
- Died: 22 February 1641
- Dynasty: Kinlaza dynasty

Álvaro VI of Kongo, sometimes called Nimi a Lukeni a Nzenze a Ntumba (in the Kikongo language), was a ruler of the Kingdom of Kongo.

He was the first member of the Kinlaza kanda, and like his brother, Garcia II established the line in power. At the death of his predecessor, Alvaro IV an eleven year old candidate from the House of Kwilu, was overthrown by the ambitious Daniel da Silva, Duke of Mbamba. Alvaro VI and his brother Garcia defended the young king. In gratitude Alvaro V awarded the future Alvaro VI with the duchy of Mbamba in 1634. Alvaro IV died shortly after and was succeeded by his half brother, Alvaro V who was then himself poisoned.

Jealous members of the house of Kwilu, led by Gregorio, a court noble tried to engineer a coup to defeat Alvaro VI and his brother Garcia, but failed, and they stormed the capital and installed Alvaro VI as king on 26 February 1636. Gregorio, in turn went eastward and recruited the Duke of Mbata to assist in a counterattack, which failed.

He was descended through the female line of Anna Ntumba from King Afonso I. He was not supportive of Dutch comment in Soyo, and eventually forced the Count, Paulo to force them out. During his six-year reign he abandoned the marquisate of Makuta to the Count of Soyo (in 1637) and fought with the Dutch in against the Portuguese at Luanda.

Álvaro died on January or February 22, 1641; his brother succeeded him as Garcia II of Kongo.

== See also ==
- Kingdom of Kongo
- List of rulers of Kongo

Preceded by Álavaro V	Manikongo; 1636–1641	Succeeded by Garcia II
