= Garcia II of Kongo =

Garcia II
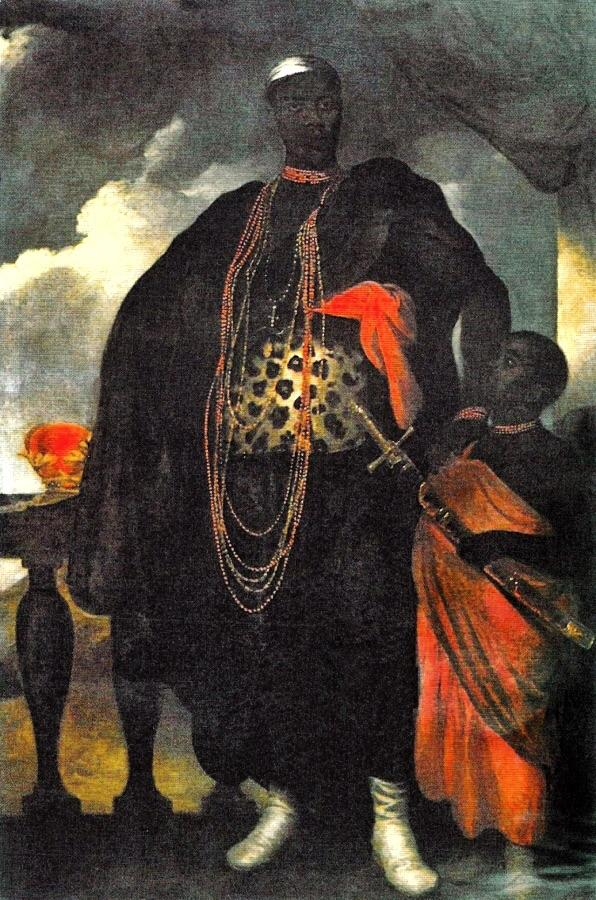
- Garcia II of Kongo

Mwene Kongo
- Reign: 1641 - 1660
- Predecessor: Álvaro VI
- Successor: António I
- Dynasty: Kinlaza

Garcia II, born Nkanga a Lukeni a Nzenze a Ntumba, also known as Garcia Afonso for short, ruled the Kingdom of Kongo from 23 January 1641 to 1660. He is sometimes considered Kongo's greatest king for his religious piety and his near expulsion of the Portuguese from Angola. He also participated in the Atlantic slave trade.

== Early life ==
Garcia and his brother Álvaro Nimi were born in the early 17th century. Both brothers attended the Jesuit college at São Salvador (modern M'banza-Kongo) soon after it was opened in 1620. As students, they studied with the Jesuit priest João de Paiva and joined the lay brotherhood of St. Ignatius. During his youth, Garcia obtained the nickname "Kipaku" ("Quipaco") of uncertain meaning. In 1634, when King Álvaro IV was threatened by Daniel da Silva, Duke of Mbamba, the brothers came to the king's aid. Garcia was particularly valiant during the desperate battle in the County of Soyo, when the royal army was backed up against the river. The brothers were awarded for their bravery: Garcia was named Marquis of Kiova, a small territory on the south bank of the Congo River, while his brother was promoted to Duke of Mbamba. However, in 1636 Álvaro V sought to remove and execute the brothers, and in defense they defeated and beheaded the king. Garcia's brother Álvaro was then crowned King Álvaro VI and named Garcia as Duke of Mbamba.

== Taking the Throne and the Dutch War ==
On 22 January 1641, Álvaro VI died under mysterious circumstances. Before an election to replace his brother could be held, Garcia moved forces from Mbamba to the capital and forcibly became king. Within a few weeks, Paulo, the Count of Soyo and longtime ally, died and was replaced by his and Garcia's enemy Daniel da Silva. Concurrently, the Dutch armada invaded and took the Portuguese colony of Luanda. Garcia immediately moved his armies south to assist the Dutch, as Kongo had a long-term pact to help the Dutch drive the Portuguese out of Angola. In 1642, he received an embassy from the Dutch and signed an alliance and agreement, but refused to accept a Calvinist preacher from them due to his Catholic background.

Garcia hoped that the Dutch would assist him in driving the Portuguese out of Angola, as these terms had been laid down as early as 1622 when Pedro II of Kongo had proposed the Kongo-Dutch alliance. However, the Dutch were not as willing to press their attack home once they had taken Luanda. Instead, they hoped to make it a trading post and allowed the Portuguese to continue to possess their inland territories. Dutch soldiers, however, helped Garcia defeat a rebellion in the small southern district of Nsala in 1642, the slaves captured from this paying for Dutch expenses in taking Luanda.

In 1643, as the relations between the Dutch West India Company and the Portuguese broke down, Garcia's forces assisted in driving the Portuguese from their positions on the Bengo River. However, the Dutch again refused to press home the attack, allowing the Portuguese to regroup further inland at Massangano.

Garcia could not commit more forces to the campaign against Portugal due to increasing hostility with Daniel da Silva. Thus, in 1645, he sought to drive Daniel from Soyo, but was defeated trying to take the Soyo fortified position at Mfinda Ngula. His son and would-be heir, Afonso, was captured while leading the Kongo forces, and a campaign to free him in 1646 failed. Because of these wars, Kongo could only send small forces when the Dutch declared war in alliance with Queen Njinga of Matamba on the Portuguese in fear of the reinforced Portuguese driving them out of Luanda. Although the allies were successful at the Battle of Kombi in 1647, they were unable to dislodge the Portuguese from their forts. Further reinforcements from Brazil in 1648 forced the Dutch to withdraw.

== Following the Portuguese Restoration ==
In the years following the Dutch war, Garcia sought to make amends with the Portuguese and settle relations. Salvador Correia de Sá, the Portuguese governor, drafted a treaty demanding from Garcia the Island of Luanda, all lands south of the Bengo River, the rights to all mines in Kongo, payment of an indemnity, and other major concessions. Garcia proposed a different treaty that insisted on the restoration of his rights to the south of the Bengo River as well as other demands. The treaty was presented in 1649 and, while Garcia did pay an indemnity, neither side signed the treaty.

Garcia turned his attention to internal affairs following the Dutch period. Capuchin missionaries, who arrived from Italy and Spain, helped provide more clergy for the Church in 1645. Although Garcia initially welcomed the clergymen, he became suspicious and accused them of plotting against Kongo in 1652. In the same year, he imprisoned Dona Leonor, an elderly and well respected queen, for her involvement in an alleged plot. Leonor died in prison, which caused Garcia to lose considerable public confidence.

In 1655 Garcia again attempted to take Soyo. Two sons of Pedro II, as members of the House of Nsundi (or the Kinkanga a Mvika), tried to overthrow him the next year. The Portuguese intervened on their behalf and also tried to attack Kongo. However, Garcia defeated the brothers and prevented the Portuguese, who remembered their crushing defeat following the Battle of Mbumbi in 1622, from crossing the Loje River. By 1657, Garcia II had annihilated or absorbed all of the House of Nsundi.

Garcia died in 1660, leaving his second son António I of Kongo to succeed him.

== See also ==
- List of Manikongo of Kongo
- Kingdom of Kongo
- Angolan Wars

== Sources ==
- Graziano Saccardo, Congo e Angola con la storia dell'antica missione dei' Cappuccini (3 vols., Venice, 1982–83).

Preceded by Álvaro VI	Manikongo; 1641–1660	Succeeded by António I
