= Soyo =

- Municipality and city
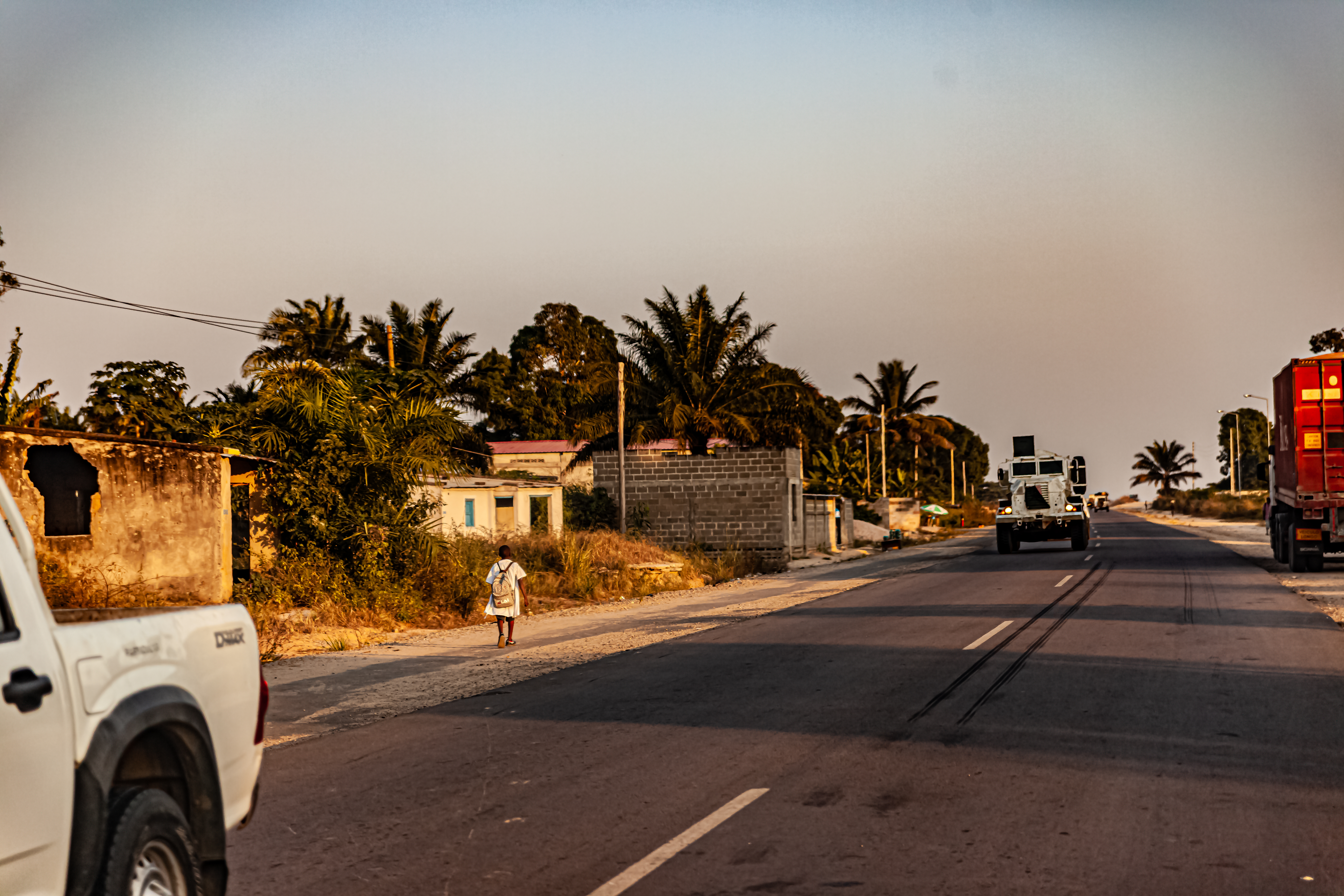
- Road in Soyo

- Location in Angola
- Coordinates: 6°08′S 12°22′E
- Country: Angola
- Province: Zaire Province
- Founded: Before the 15th Century
- City Status: 1974
- Founder: Bakongo

Area
  - Total: 1,087 sq mi (2,816 km^{2})

Population (2024 census)
  - Total: 221,555
  - Density: 203.8/sq mi (78.68/km^{2})
- Time zone: UTC+1 (WAT)
- Climate: Aw

Soyo (formerly known as Santo António do Zaire) is a city, with a population of 200,920 (2014 census), and a municipality, with a population of 221,555 (2024 census), located in the province of Zaire in Angola, at the mouth of the Congo River. Historically, Soyo was a significant city in conflicts between the Kingdom of Kongo, Portuguese Angola, and the Dutch West India Company. Soyo became an independent state in the 17th century and had significant influence on politics in Kongo during the Kongo Civil War.

Soyo has recently become the largest oil-producing region in Angola, with an estimated production of 1,200,000 barrels per day (190,000 m^{3}/d).

== Early history ==
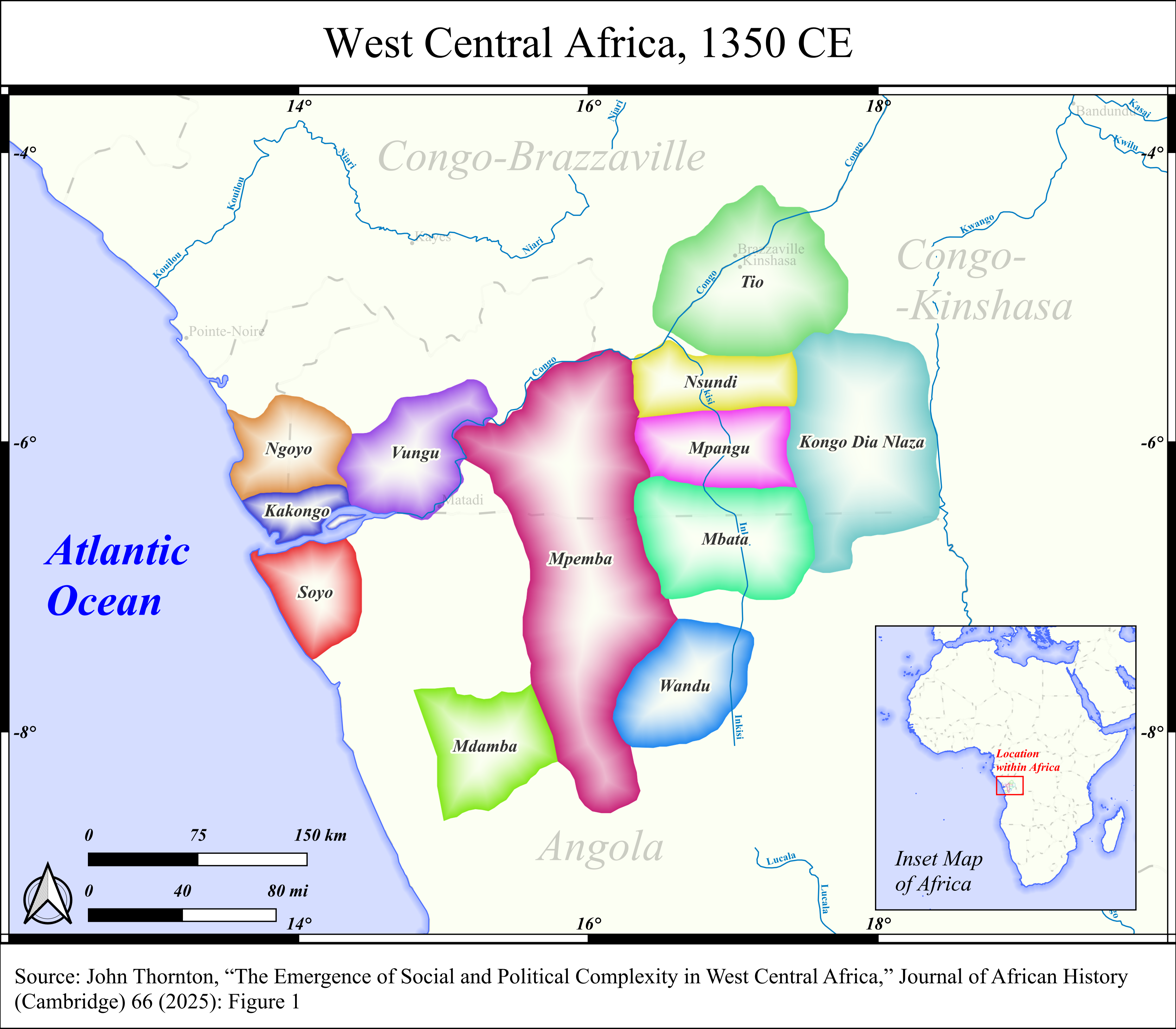
States of the western Congo Basin, c. 1350

Soyo (originally spelled "Sonho" and pronounced Sonyo) was a province of the Kingdom of Kongo, which stretched south from the mouth of the Congo River to the River Loze, and inland from about 100 kilometers. It was already an administrative entity whose ruler or governor bore the title mwene Soyo or "lord of Soyo" when the Portuguese arrived in 1482. The ruler was the first Kongo lord to be baptized when Christian missionaries came to the kingdom of Kongo in 1491.

Soyo was typically ruled in the sixteenth century by a member of Kongo's royal family, presumably appointed by the king and serving for a limited term. The ruler at the time of the Portuguese, baptized as Manuel, was said to be the uncle of the ruling king. Within Kongo's oversight, Soyo was permitted to expand and conquer other regions under royal rule. Thus, Nzinga a Nkuwu, ruling king of Kongo in 1491 permitted an expansion of Soyo's territory following the baptism of the ruler. This expansion allowed Soyo to control several sub-provinces including Pambala, Kimi, Tubii, along the Congo River, and Lovata (among others) along the Atlantic coast.

Soyo's port of Mpinda, located near the mouth of the Congo River, became an important port in the sixteenth century trade of Kongo. A community of Portuguese settled there and conducted a trade in slaves, ivory and copper from the port. A Kongo royal inquest of 1548 revealed that as many as 4,000 slaves passed through Mpinda en route to the island colony of São Tomé, and then to Brazil every year.

During the 1580s Alvaro, king of Congo, on occasion blocked people working with the Portuguese government from coming through Mpinda.

In the early 1590s Miguel was designated as a Count when Kongo's king Álvaro II introduced European style titles of nobility. He was, however, not entirely supportive of Álvaro's ambitions and there was a long period of considerable tension between Kongo and Soyo, resulting in the recognition of Miguel as a more or less independent ruler.

Subsequent kings, however, reversed this, and continued to place their own candidates in Soyo

Paulo, placed in Soyo by King Pedro II, served a very long term 1626 to 1641. Paulo, who was related to King Pedro II, who placed him in office, often was a partisan of Pedro's family, and as such was often involved in the complex civil wars that plagued Kongo in the 1620s and 1630s.

== Independence ==
In 1641, Daniel da Silva replaced Paulo and was immediately opposed by the newly enthroned King Garcia II of Kongo, who sought to replace him. Count Daniel resisted, claiming that the counts of Soyo had a right to be selected through election of their own noble subordinates. Garcia tried to return Soyo to his control by wars, but Garcia's attempts, in 1641, 1643, 1645 and 1656 all failed, often with heavy losses. This was primarily because the royal armies could not attack the fortified wooded area of Soyo called Nfinda Ngula near the capital.

As Soyo became more independent, its rulers took the title Prince, and then Grand Prince of Soyo in the late seventeenth and early eighteenth century. Soyo was actively involved in Kongo's politics during and after Garcia II's reign, especially as defenders of the Kimpanzu branch of the family. Counts of Soyo protected them and gave them refuge, as they did in 1656 when a conspiracy to overthrow Garcia organized by sons of Pedro II failed.

In 1670, the Portuguese governor sought to take over Kongo, then involved in a civil war, and invaded Soyo. After a first victory, the Portuguese forces were defeated and utterly routed by Soyo at the Battle of Kitombo, in Nfinda Ngula near the capital. The day of this victory, October 18, 1670, and St. Luke's day, is considered an important holiday.

In 1670, the city of Soyo had about 30,000 residents.

The early 1670s saw several changes of rulership in Soyo. Estevao II da Silva became ruler in 1676. He proceeded to be a power broker in the Kongo Kingdom.

In the 1680s Antonio II Baretto da Silva, the count of Soyo, waged war with Kakongo and Ngoyo, the kingdoms to the north of the Congo River.

After 1708, Soyo did not participate at all in the elections of rulers of the Kingdom of Kongo.

== Economy ==
Supported by an airport and a sea port, Soyo plays a major role in Angola's oil production due to the cities proximity to off-shore oil extraction and exploration activities. The government plans to build an oil refinery at Soyo.
