= Kimpanzu =

1636–1764 ruling dynasty of the Kingdom of Kongo

House of Kimpanzu Mpanzu kanda
- Parent house: House of Kinkanga
- Country: Kingdom of Kongo Kingdom of Loango Kingdom of Kakongo Kingdom of Ngoyo Kingdom of Ndongo
- Founded: 27 February 1636; 390 years ago
- Founder: Álvaro V
- Final ruler: Pedro V
- Titles: List: King of Kongo; King of Loango; King of Kakongo; King of Ngoyo; King on this side of the Zaire and beyond it; King of Nkondo; King of Mbamba-Lovata; Lord of the Ambundu; Lord of Angola; Lord of Aquisima; Lord of Musuru; Lord of Matamba; Lord of Malilu; Lord of Musuko; Lord of Anzizo; Lord of the conquest of Pangu-Alumbu
- Deposition: 1764

The Kimpanzu were members of the Mpanzu kanda also known as the House of Kimpanzu, one of the lineages from which the kings of Kongo were chosen during the 17th century and following Kongo's reunification under Pedro IV. They are remembered in tradition and are evoked in a proverb, still current in the 1920s Nkutama a mvila za makanda "Kinlaza, Kimpanzu ye Kinlaza makukwa matatu malambila Kongo" (Kinkanga, Kimpanzu and Kinlaza are the three stones on which Kongo cooked).

== Origins ==
The Mpanzu kanda takes its name from King Álvaro V whom came to power in 1636. He was the half-brother of the young king Álvaro IV, though it is unclear if he shared the same father, Álvaro III. After Álvaro IV's murder, Álvaro V took the throne.

== Fall from power ==
The Kimpanzu dynasty in Kongo would be a short one, and civil war continued between partisans of the Count of Soyo and a noble named Gregario. The Count and his allies, two Jesuit brothers once loyal to Álvaro IV, won. The brothers, Álvaro Nimi and Garcia Nkanga, defeated and decapitated Álvaro V and set up their own dynasty known as the House of Kinlaza. Those among the Kimpanzu who would not recognize the brothers fled south to Soyo.

== Opposition to the Kinlaza ==
The Kimpanzu retreated to the mountains in the south of Soyo, then ruled by Daniel da Silva. Though nominally a province of Kongo, the county had become more and more independent of the mwenekongo as time passed. Soyo was crucial for its military might and position as an elector of kings. From 1625 until 1641, the office of Count of Soyo had been filled by men loyal to the House of Nsundi and later House of Kinlaza. But when Count Paulo died in 1641, the office was seized by Daniel da Silva. Still holding a grudge against the brothers that had removed him from his place as Duke of Mbamba, Count Daniel da Silva made Soyo a haven for Kimpanzu sympathizers.

The Silva kanda became allies and protectors of the Kimpanzu allowing their partisans to plot against the Kinlaza from Mbamba Luvota. Soyo was determined to gain full independence from Kongo and backed various opponents to the Kinlaza including the remnants of the House of Nsundi. This resulted in a failed assassination attempt on Garcia II. The kanda of the House of Nsundi, Nkanka a Mvika, was crushed in retribution by Garcia and ceased to exist by the 1660s. The Kimpanzu; however, were too far from his reach to be taken completely out of the picture.

== Kimpanzu after the Kongo Civil War ==
Kimpanzu members were closely allied to Soyo for much of the earlier civil war period, and in this time their leader, Suzana de Nóbrega was lodged in the province of Luvota on Soyo's southern border. They vigorously opposed the House of Kinlaza politically and even militarily before, during and after the Kongo Civil War which raged from 1665 to 1709. In order to reunify Kongo, the Água Rosada kanda arranged for the throne of Kongo to rotate between the two Kinlaza branches and the Kimpanzu. They returned to power with the election of Manuel II following the death of Pedro IV in 1718. The last important Kimpanzu to hold office was the first king Pedro V, who died in 1779, even though his regent and partisans kept up pressure to allow a successor to rule. The line of kings buried in Sembo, whose cemetery was visited in 1859 by the German anthropologist Adolf Bastian were probably other unknown Kimpanzu pretenders.

== See also ==
- Kingdom of Kongo
- Kongo Civil War
- Kinlaza
- Kinkanga
- List of rulers of Kongo
