= Kinlaza =

1600s–1800s noble dynasty of the Kingdom of Kongo

House of Kinlaza Nlaza kanda
- Parent house: House of Kilukeni
- Country: Kingdom of Kongo Kingdom of Loango Kingdom of Kakongo Kingdom of Ngoyo Kingdom of Ndongo
- Founded: 27 August 1636; 390 years ago
- Founder: Álvaro VI
- Final ruler: Pedro V
- Titles: List: King of Kongo; King of Loango; King of Kakongo; King of Ngoyo; King on this side of the Zaire and beyond it; King of Kibangu; King of Lemba-Mbula; Lord of the Ambundu; Lord of Angola; Lord of Aquisima; Lord of Musuru; Lord of Matamba; Lord of Malilu; Lord of Musuko; Lord of Anzizo; Lord of the conquest of Pangu-Alumbu
- Deposition: February 1891
- Cadet branches: Água Rosada

The Kinlaza were members of the Nlaza kanda or House of Kinlaza, one of the ruling houses of the Kingdom of Kongo during the 17th century. It was one of the main factions during the Kongo Civil War along with the Kimpanzu and Kinkanga a Mvika kandas. They are remembered in tradition and are evoked in a proverb, still current in the 1920s Nkutama a mvila za makanda "Kinkanga, Kimpanzu ye Kinlaza makukwa matatu malambila Kongo" (Kinkanga, Kimpanzu and Kinlaza are the three stones on which Kongo cooked).

== Etymology ==
In KiKongo the language of the kingdom of Kongo, the name of the kanda is Nlaza. The class ki- /-i form, which often refers to membership in a category (and thus includes, for example, village names) is Kinlaza. Thus, the Portuguese reference to the faction as the "House of Kinlaza" can be understood as the "House of Nlaza".

== Origins ==
The exact genealogical origins of the Kinlaza lineage are unclear. By the early twentieth century, having a “Nlaza father” did not indicate biological fatherhood, but rather that one was a member of the Kinlaza kanda clan. For this reason, the histories recalled that Lukeni lua Nsanze was the sister of Mpuku a Nsuku. This woman is likely a direct relative of Anna, the daughter of Afonso I, and is therefore the actual progenitor of the Kinlaza's who would rule Mbata, however sources vary. What is known for certain is that they are descended from the line of Afonso I and Alvaro III.

Their origin lies in a division of the Kongolese royal family into three separate branches, by at least as early as the 1620s. The Kongolese nobility took their descent from both parental lines, and so among those descended from King Afonso I there was quickly division. From the line of Alvaro III came the Kimpanzu family; from Pedro II came the Kinkanga, and, significantly, from Afonso I's daughter Anna came the Kinlaza clan, who were closely related to the Kimpanzu, but descending from a different intermediate set of relatives.

== Role before the Civil Wars ==
Kinlaza role in the civil wars began with Garcia II. The Kimpanzu king Alvaro IV granted Garcia and his brother, also named Alvaro, control of the territories of Mbamba and Kiova in exchange for their capable military service in putting down a rebellion. Alvaro of the Kinlaza would later overthrow Alvaro V, reigning as Alvaro VI, and was replaced by his brother Garcia in 1641. Garcia II would begin a campaign of consolidation and political control by crushing the Kinkanga and Kimpanzu clans. The nascent Kongolese church, while mostly consisting of foreigners, was not excluded from the lineage-politics, with the Kinlaza's aligning with the Capuchin missionaries and the Kimpanzu more grouped towards the Jesuits.

Garcia II was succeeded by his son, Antonio I, who was even more ruthless in the persecution of his enemies than his father. He, attempting to cut off anticipated Portuguese influence there, invaded the Ndembu region, starting a war with the Angolan settlers there. They would engage in a civil war with their sister-branches of the Kimpanzu and Kinkanga. This separation remained an important recorded event, “for even the kinglist of 1758 notes the same three names in conjunction with this event” (Thornton). It survived as part of the historical consciousness of at least one of the surviving families, the Kinkanga, even as the written records were lost, as a saying: “Kinlaza, Kimpanzu, Kinkanga: three stones on which Kongo cooked.”

== Struggle for throne with Kimpanzu ==
These crackdowns had the secondary effect of producing a great number of slaves. They were primarily sold through the ports of Sonyo. As Portuguese shipping focused more on Angola, often there were more slaves in Sonyo than could be bought at any one time. This had the effect of often leading the slaves to have to engage in agriculture to sustain themselves. By 1645, Sonyo was a large and prosperous town, rivaling the Kongolese capital. The Sonyo began to assert their independence against the centralization efforts of the Kinlaza, and with Dutch weapons and support, engaged in full-fledged war with Kongo over a period of twenty-five years. This continued to reflect Church politics, as Sonyo began to receive definite Protestant influence, while Kongo remained steadily Catholic.

Sonyo's resistance to Kongo had widespread effects on the kingdom's stability. The Kinlaza had made many enemies with their aggressive consolidation of power, and with the common intermarriage between the nobles of both countries, there was now an asylum for undesirable nobles to congregate. This undermined the power of the Kinlaza dynasty. Vanquished families no longer had to reconcile themselves with the Kinlaza, as they could simply retire to Sonyo and plot rebellion.

With the accession of Antonio I to the throne after the death of his father, he failed to cultivate the positive relationship with the Portuguese that his father had. This led to an alliance of the Angolans with the Kimpanzu in Sonyo, with a successful and destructive campaign against the capital, Sao Salvador. Eventually, Antonio himself was killed on the battlefield, sparking an even greater crisis. It was a disastrous and humiliating battle for Kongo, which lost many of its nobles along with the king. While the Portuguese took the royal regalia back to Lisbon in triumph, they generally were not any more heavy-handed in their oversight of the region than they had been before. However, Sonyo, and therefore the Kimpanzu clan, was now able to take the offensive against a weakened and disorganized Kongo.

== Decline after the Civil War ==
The civil war between the Kinlaza and Kimpanzu, exacerbated by these factors, would continue for another thirty years, until Pedro IV, descended from both the Kinlaza and Kimpanzu, finally brought a fragile peace by instituting an official rotation of the royal office between the two families in the early 18th century. The Kinlaza northern branch, founded by João II at Mbula (or Lemba) made a claim on the throne, but the branch of this family that supported Pedro IV and opposed João's sister Elena in the 1710s eventually was able to become kings of Kongo when Garcia IV came to power in 1743. A southern branch, led by Ana Afonso de Leão did not hold power for a long time, and indeed, her home territory of Nkondo (Mucondo) was their primary base. With the declining stability of the kingdom, many of the outer provinces chose independence in the face of an increasingly ineffective central kingdom. One such province was that of Wandu, governed by another branch of the Kinlaza family. The queen Violante of Wandu would conduct an invasion of Kongo in 1764, driving King Alvaro XI, another Kinlaza, from the throne temporarily. He himself had ended the period of alternating succession by deposing "Pedro V" the Kimpanzu. By 1779, the southern Kinlazas came to power with the ascent of José I, and held power until Afonso V succeeded his brother José in 1785. The crisis that followed Afonso's death in 1787, however, left the southern Kinlazas out. The official king Pedro V (1856–85) (not to be confused with Pedro V of Kimpanzu) may have had connections to the southern Kinlazas in the nineteenth century, since his base at Mbembe was close to the lands of the Nkondo, though no clear connection has been established. After this period, the decline of the Kingdom of Kongo accelerated, and with it the fortunes of the Kinlaza family. The kingdom would endure even beyond the Congress of Berlin until its finally dissolution by the Portuguese government in 1914.

== See also ==
- Kingdom of Kongo
- Kimpanzu
- Kinkanga
- Kongo Civil War
- List of rulers of Kongo
