= List of rulers of Kongo =

Manikongo of Kongo
- Imperial

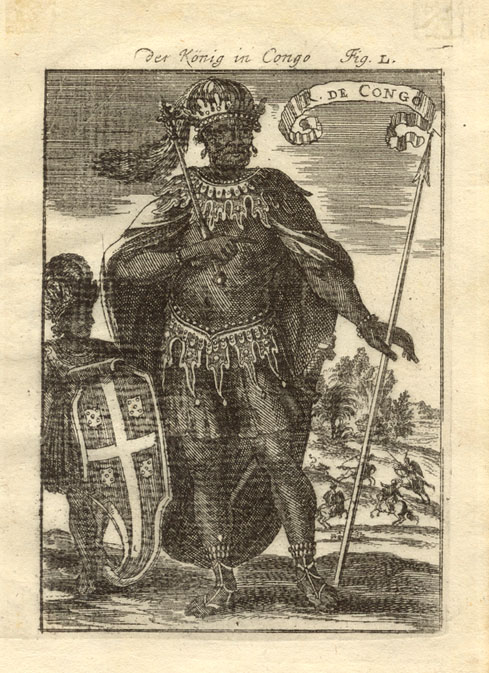
- Álvaro I of Kongo

Details
- First monarch: Lukeni lua Nimi
- Last monarch: Manuel III
- Formed: c. 1390; 636 years ago
- Abolished: 1914
- Residence: Mbanza Kongo
- Appointer: Hereditary, Dynastic (various)
- Pretender: See list

This is a list of the rulers of the Kingdom of Kongo, known commonly as the Manikongos (KiKongo: Mwenekongo). Mwene (plural: Awene) in Kikongo meant a person holding authority, particularly judicial authority, derived from the root -wene which meant territory (over which jurisdiction was held). The ruler of Kongo was the most powerful mwene in the region who the Portuguese regarded as the king (in Kikongo ntinu) upon their arrival in 1483.

The kings claimed several titles and the following royal style in Portuguese "Pela graça de Deus Rei do Congo, do Loango, de Cacongo e de Ngoio, aquém e além do Zaire, Senhor dos Ambundos e de Angola, de Aquisima, de Musuru, de Matamba, de Malilu, de Musuko e Anzizo, da conquista de Pangu-Alumbu, etc.", that means "By the grace of God King of Kongo, of Loango, of Kakongo and of Ngoyo, on this side of the Zaire and beyond it, Lord of the Ambundu and of Angola, of Aquisima, of Musuru, of Matamba, of Malilu, of Musuko and Anzizo, of the conquest of Pangu-Alumbu, etc.".

== Kandas, Gerações and Houses ==
The kingdom of Kongo had a formal state apparatus, in which most positions (rendas in Portuguese-language documents, meaning income bearing positions) were in the hands of the king, and the king himself was elected by powerful officials. Kings sought and held office with the assistance of a kanda. Each kanda (plural: makanda) was a faction which organized people according to a common goal, often but not always rooted in a kin-based relationship. Kandas generally took the name of a person (i.e. Nimi, Nlaza or Mpanzu), but could also take the name of a location or title such as Mbala (court)) or birthplace (Kwilu or Nsundi). The Kikongo prefix "ki" is added onto these names to mean "people with something in common". These factions were recorded as gerações or casas (lineages or houses) in Kongo documents written in Portuguese. Until the mid-seventeenth century, following the Battle of Mbwila, these factions were short-lived and fluctuating, but following the battle, factions were much firmer and lasted for generations, particularly the Kimpanzu and Kinlaza. The Quilombo dos Palmares, a Maroon kingdom formed in Northeast Brazil, was founded by princes and nobles who were enslaved and transported to Portuguese Brazil after the battle in Kongo. There, they retained their titles and their lineage survived even after the kingdom itself was destroyed.

== Dynasties ==
When the Portuguese arrived in Kongo in 1483, the reigning king represented the Nimi kanda. This kanda was probably descended from Nimi a Nzima, father of the founder of Kongo. Divisions emerged within the kanda during succession disputes, for example, following the death of Afonso I in 1542, his son Pedro I and grandson Diogo I formed two opposed factions, that of Pedro was called the Kibala (court) faction, and the other, whose name is unknown that followed Diogo. Other elections in the sixteenth century probably also involved similar factions, though the details are unknown.

King Álvaro I was the first king of the House of Kwilu (Portuguese: Coulo). This kanda or lineage was named for the birthplace of Álvaro, north of the capital city. The Kwilu reigned until 1614 when Antonio da Silva, Duke of Mbamba intervened to place Bernardo I on the throne, in place of Álvaro II's minor son, who would eventually take office as Álvaro III.

Another kanda, the House of Nsundi, later known as the Kinkanga a Mvika, took control of Kongo in 1622 under Pedro II, and retained it through the reign of his son, Garcia I. Garcia never held power strongly, and the Kimpanzu returned to power under Ambrosio I. Kimpanzu domination ended in 1641 when two brothers Álvaro and Garcia of the new House of Kinlaza overthrew Álvaro V and took power. The members of the Kikanga a Mvika were all killed or absorbed into the Kinlaza by 1657. The Kinlaza dynasty would reign until Kongo's catastrophic civil war following the 1665 Battle of Mbwila, when sporadic and violent alternation followed.

The capital was destroyed in 1678. Its destruction forced the claimants from both sides of the conflict to rule from mountain fortresses. The Kinlaza retreated to Mbula where they founded the capital of Lemba. Earlier another branch of Kinlaza, under the leadership of Garcia III of Kongo founded a settlement at Kibangu. The Kimpanzu based their struggle for the throne at Mbamba Luvota in the south of Soyo. A new faction appeared in the form of the Água Rosada kanda, headquartered at the mountain fortress of Kibangu. This might be considered a new house formed from both the Kinlaza and Kimpanzu, its founders were the children of a Kimpanzu father and a Kinlaza mother. All parties claimed kingship over Kongo (or what was left of it), but their power rarely held beyond their fortresses or the immediately surrounding area.

The country was finally reunited by Pedro IV of the Água Rosada kanda. Pedro IV declared a doctrine of shared power by which the throne would shift (in due time) from Kinlaza to the Kimpanzu and back., while the Água Rosada appear to have continued as neutral in Pedro's fortress of Kibangu.

The system functioned sporadically, with considerable fighting, until 1764 when José I of the Kinlaza faction usurped the throne and thrust the country back into civil war. The Kinlaza enjoyed a short-lived second dynasty that ended in 1788. After that, the throne moved through various royal hands until the kingship was extinguished in 1914.

== Elections ==
The selection of kings of Kongo was by a variety of principles, as kings themselves evoked different methods of selection in their letters announcing their succession. Typically the kingdom was said to pass by election, though the electors and the process they used changed over time and according to circumstances. Frequently election seems to have been a combination of elective and hereditary principles.

== Kings of Kongo ==
The following section is divided into periods based on kanda or house rulership. Most houses reigned of a distinct period with few if any intervals. This is not the case, however; after the Kongo Civil War. During this period you will note the name of each king's kanda alongside their reign.

=== Pre-colonial rulers ===
==== Ancestors of later rulers ====
According to oral tradition, the first king was the son of chief Nimi and his consort of unknown name, Mwene Mbata's daughter. Most of the succeeding dynasties either claim descent from this union or otherwise derive their legitimacy from it.

==== House of Kilukeni/Lukeni kanda (1390s–1568) ====
Name	Lifespan	Reign start	Reign end	Notes	Family	Image
Lukeni lua Nimi	c. 1380 – c. 1420 (aged 39/40)	c. 1390	c. 1420	1 Manikongo. He was the son of Chief Nimi and his consort, Mwene Mbata's daughter.	Kilukeni	
Nanga of Kongo	c. 1381 – c. 1435 (aged 53/54)	c. 1420	c. 1435	2 Manikongo. He was a cousin of his predecessor.	Kilukeni	
Nlaza of Kongo	c. 1407 – c. 1450 (aged 42/43)	c. 1435	c. 1450	3 Manikongo. He was a cousin of the 1st King.	Kilukeni	
Nkuwu a Ntinu of Kongo	c. 1422 – c. 1470 (aged 47/48)	c. 1450	c. 1470	4 Manikongo. He was the son of the 1st King. Also known as Nkuwu a Lukeni.	Kilukeni	
João I Nzinga a Nkuwu	c. 1440 – 1509 (aged 68/69)	c. 1470	1509	5 Manikongo. He was the son of his predecessor and was baptized as João I on 3 May 1491, but returned to traditional beliefs around 1495.	Kilukeni	
Afonso I Mvemba a Nzinga	1456–1542 or 1543 (aged 85/86 or 86/87)	1509	1542 or 1543	6 Manikongo. He was the son of his predecessor and the first true Catholic king of Kongo. After him every king was Catholic. Granted a coat of arms.	Kilukeni	
Pedro I Nkanga a Mvemba	1478–1566 (aged 87/88)	1542/43	1545	7 Manikongo. He was the son of his predecessor, but a member of a different Kanda (the House of Kibala).	Kilukeni	
Francisco I of Kongo	1500–1545 (aged 44/45)	1545	1545	8 Manikongo. He was the son of his predecessor.	Kilukeni	
Diogo I Nkumbi a Mpudi	1503–1561 (aged 57/58)	1545	4 November 1561	9 Manikongo. He was a brother of his predecessor.	Kilukeni	
Afonso II Mpemba a Nzinga	1531 – 1 December 1561 (aged 29/30)	4 November 1561	1 December 1561	10 Manikongo. He was the son of his predecessor.	Kilukeni	
Bernardo I of Kongo	1534 – 10 April 1567 (aged 31/32)	1 December 1561	10 April 1567	11 Manikongo. He was a brother of his predecessor.	Kilukeni	
Henrique I Nerika a Mpudi	1505 – 1 February 1568 (aged 62/63)	10 April 1567	1 February 1568	12 Manikongo. He was the uncle of his predecessor.	Kilukeni	

==== House of Kwilu/Kwilu kanda (1568–1622) ====
Name	Lifespan	Reign start	Reign end	Notes	Family	Image
Álvaro I Nimi a Lukeni lua Mvemba	1537 – 6 March 1587 (aged 49/50)	1 February 1568	6 March 1587	13 Manikongo. He was the son-in-law of his predecessor. Granted a coat of arms.	Kwilu	
Álvaro II Nimi a Nkanga	1565 – 9 August 1614 (aged 48/49)	6 March 1587	9 August 1614	14 Manikongo. He was a son of his predecessor.	Kwilu	
Bernardo II Nimi a Nkanga	1570 – 20 August 1615 (aged 44/45)	9 August 1614	20 August 1615	15 Manikongo. He was a brother of his predecessor.	Kwilu	
Álvaro III Nimi a Mpanzu	1595 – 4 May 1622 (aged 26/27)	20 August 1615	4 May 1622	16 Manikongo. He was the son of his predecessor.	Kwilu	

==== House of Nsundi/Kinkanga a Mvika kanda (1622–1626) ====
Name	Lifespan	Reign start	Reign end	Notes	Family	Image
Pedro II Nkanga a Mvika	1575 – 13 April 1624 (aged 48/49)	27 April 1622	13 April 1624	17 Manikongo. He was a distant cousin of his predecessor.	Kinkanga	
Garcia I Mvemba a Nkanga	1600 – 26 June 1626 (aged 25/26)	13 April 1624	26 June 1626	18 Manikongo. He was the son of his predecessor.	Kinkanga	

==== House of Kwilu/Kwilu kanda (1626–1636) ====
Name	Lifespan	Reign start	Reign end	Notes	Family	Image
Ambrósio I Nimi a Nkanga	1600/1610 – 7 March 1631 (aged 21/31)	March 1626	7 March 1631	19 Manikongo. He was the son of Álvaro III.	Kwilu	
Álvaro IV Nzinga a Nkuwu	1610 – 25 March 1636 (aged 25/26)	8 February 1631	24 February 1636	20 Manikongo. He was a brother of his predecessor.	Kwilu	

==== House of Kimpanzu/Mpanzu kanda (1636) ====
Name	Lifespan	Reign start	Reign end	Notes	Family	Image
Álvaro V Mpanzu a Nimi	1613 – 14 August 1636 (aged 23)	27 February 1636	14 August 1636	21 Manikongo. He was a son of Pedro II.	Kimpanzu	

==== House of Kinlaza/Nlaza kanda (1636–1665) ====
Name	Lifespan	Reign start	Reign end	Notes	Family	Image
Álvaro VI Nimi a Lukeni a Nzenze a Ntumba	1581 – 22 February 1641 (aged 59/60)	27 August 1636	22 February 1641	22 Manikongo. He was a descendant of Afonso I.	Kinlaza	
Garcia II Nkanga a Lukeni a Nzenze a Ntumba	1615 – 23 January 1660 (aged 44/45)	23 February 1641	23 January 1660	23 Manikongo. He was a brother of his predecessor. Granted a coat of arms.	Kinlaza	
António I Mvita a Nkanga	1617 – 29 October 1665 (aged 47/48)	23 January 1660	29 October 1665	24 Manikongo. He was a nephew of his predecessor.	Kinlaza	

==== Civil War (1665–1709) ====
Kings of São Salvador (1665–1678 and 1691–1709)

Name	Lifespan	Reign start	Reign end	Notes	Family	Image
Afonso II of Kongo and Nkondo	1632–1669 (aged 36/37)	November 1665	December 1665	Claimed the title of Manikongo. He ruled the capital of the once unified Kingdom, but was deposed only a month into his term. The deposed king was forced to flee into the mountains of Nkondo where he ruled until his death in 1669. Was a relative of António I.	Kimpanzu	
Álvaro VII Mpanzu a Mpandu	1631 – June 1666 (aged 34/35)	December 1665	June 1666	Claimed the title of Manikongo. He sent Capuchin friar, Friar Girolamo of Montesarchio, to make peace with the Portuguese in to Luanda, in Christmas 1665. But the friar was waylaid by a rebellion in Mbamba, and only returned to the capital in June 1666.	Kinlaza	
Álvaro VIII Mvemba a Mpanzu	1630 – January 1669 (aged 38/39)	June 1666	January 1669	Claimed the title of Manikongo. Was elevated to the throne by Paulo da Silva, Count of Soyo, who marched on São Salvador and killed his predecessor. In 1667, he sent his ambassador, Anastasius, to Luanda, to negotiate a treaty that ceded to the Portugueses the right to exploit the mines of the provinces of Mbamba and Mpemba.	Kinlaza	
Pedro III Nsimba Ntamba	1648–1680 (aged 34/35)	January 1669	June 1669	Claimed the title of Manikongo. As Marquis of Mbemba, he led a small army and attacked Mbamba, killed Count Theodosius and then invaded the kingdom's capital, killing Alvaro VIII and proclaimed himself king.	Kinlaza	
Álvaro IX Mpanzu a Ntivila	1650–1669 (aged 18/19)	June 1669	End of 1670	Claimed the title of Manikongo. In 1670, Álvaro IX was overthrown by the Soyo.	Kimpanzu	
Rafael I Nzinga a Nkanga	Unknown – 1673 (aged 4+)	End of 1670	Mid of 1673	He claimed the title of Manikongo. After his ascension, he was briefly driven from the capital by Soyo.	Kinlaza	
Afonso III Mvemba a Nimi	Unknown – mid 1674 (aged 37+)	Mid 1673	Mid 1674	He claimed the title of Manikongo. He governed the Marquisate/Kingdom of Nkondo from late 1669 until mid 1673.	Kimpanzu	
Daniel I Miala mia Nzimbwila	Unknown – mid 1678 (aged 4+)	Mid 1674	Mid 1678	He claimed the title of Manikongo. In 1678 Pedro III marched on São Salvador with Jaga mercenaries resulting in the Sack of São Salvador, which burnt the majority of the city to the ground and killed Daniel I.	Kimpanzu	
Interregnum	13 years	Mid 1678	1691	After the Sack of São Salvador the nation essentially ceased to exist for over a decade, instead split into three rival kingdoms ruled by the various claimants to the throne.		
Manuel Afonso Nzinga an Elenke	Unknown – 23 September 1693 (aged 3/7+)	1691	1692	He conquered São Salvador, but was deposed and executed in 23 September 1693.	Kimpanzu	
Pedro IV Afonso Agua Rosada Nusamu a Mvemba	c. 1666 – 21 February 1718 (aged 51/52)	1692	1704	He claimed the title of Manikongo, until he reunified the Kingdom.	Água Rosada	
Pedro Constantino da Silva	Unknown – 15 February 1709 (aged 13+)	1704	15 February 1709	He claimed the title of Manikongo and was a staunch supporter of Dona Beatriz Kimpa Vita.	Kimpanzu	

Kings of Kibangu for the House of Kinlaza (1678–1704)

Name	Lifespan	Reign start	Reign end	Notes	Family	Image
Sebastião I	1634 – 1669/70 (aged 35/36)	1666	1669/70	Claimed the title of Manikongo. He ruled the Kingdom of Kibangu and was assassinated by Dom Rafael I. His 3 sons founded the House of Água Rosada.	Kinlaza	
Garcia III Nkanga a Mvemba	Unknown – 1685/89 (aged 19+)	1669/70	1685/89	Claimed the title of Manikongo. He ruled the Kingdom of Kibangu after his father and was assassinated by Dom Pedro III.	Água Rosada	
André I Mvizi a Nkanga	1625–1685/89 (aged 60/61)	1685/89	1686/90	Claimed the title of Manikongo. He ruled the Kingdom of Kibangu after his brother, but died of natural causes after 1 year.	Kinlaza	
Manuel Afonso Nzinga an Elenke	Unknown – 23 September 1693 (aged 3/7+)	1686/90	1687/91	He conquered the Kingdom of Kibangu for a year and was executed in 23 September 1693.	Kimpanzu	
Álvaro X Nimi a Mvemba Agua Rosada	Unknown – December 1695 (aged 25+)	1688	1695	Claimed the title of Manikongo. He was a son of Sebastião I and reconquered the Kingdom of Kibangu. He ordered the edification of several churches in Kibagu but had a premature death before they were completed.	Água Rosada	
Pedro IV Afonso Agua Rosada Nusamu a Mvemba	c. 1666 – 21 February 1718 (aged 51/52)	1 December 1695	15 February 1709	He claimed the title of Manikongo, until he reunified the Kingdom. He ruled the Kingdom of Kibangu after his brother.	Água Rosada	

Kings of Nkondo for the House of Kimpanzu (1666–1709)

Name	Lifespan	Reign start	Reign end	Notes	Family	Image
Afonso II of Kongo and Nkondo	1632–1669 (aged 36/37)	1666	1669	Claimed the title of Manikongo. He was a grandson of Álvaro II, who married Ana Afonso de Leão and ruled the Kingdom of Nkondo.	Kimpanzu	
Afonso III of Kongo	Unknown – mid 1674 (aged 37+)	1669	Mid 1673	Claimed the title of Manikongo. He ruled the Kingdom of Nkondo after his brother.	Kimpanzu	
Ana Afonso de Leão	1625–1710 (aged 84/85)	1673	1709	Claimed the title of Manikongo. She was the sister of Garcia II and ruled the Kingdom of Nkondo after her brother-in-law.	Kinlaza	

Awenekongo of Lemba-Mbula for the House of Kinlaza (1669–1716)

Name	Lifespan	Reign start	Reign end	Notes	Family	Image
Pedro III Nsimba Ntamba	1648–1683 (aged 34/35)	June 1669	1680/83	Claimed the title of Manikongo. He was a grandson of Álvaro II and ruled the Kingdom of Lemba-Mbula. He was assassinated by the King of Mbamba-Lovata, Manuel de Nóbrega.	Kinlaza	
João Manuel II Nzuzi a Ntamba	Unknown–1716 (aged 36+)	1680/83	1716	Claimed the title of Manikongo. He was a brother of his predecessor and ruled the Kingdom of Lemba-Mbula.	Kinlaza	

Mwenekongo of Mbamba-Lovata for the House of Kimpanzu (1678–1715)

Name	Lifespan	Reign start	Reign end	Notes	Family	Image
Manuel II of Kongo	Unknown–1715 (aged 45+)	1678	1715	Claimed the title of Manikongo. Born Manuel de Vuzi a Nóbrega. He was a grandson of Álvaro II and ruled the Kingdom of Mbamba-Lovata.	Kimpanzu	

==== Reunification and Elective Monarchy (1709–1888) ====
- Pedro IV Nusamu a Mvemba of the House of the Agua Rosada (ruled Kibangu from December 1695 – early 1709; ruled reunited kingdom from São Salvador February 1709 – 21 February 1718)
- Manuel II Mpanzu a Nimi of the House of Kimpanzu (ruled February 1718 – 21 April 1743)
- Garcia IV Nkanga a Mvandu of the House of Kinlaza from Mbula (ruled 27 July 1743 – 31 March 1752)
- Nicolau I Misaki mia Nimi of the House of Kimpanzu (ruled 27 August 1752 – post 1758)
- Afonso IV Nkanga a Nkanga of the House of Kinlaza
- António II Mvita a Mpanzu of the House of Kimpanzu
- Sebastião I Nanga kia Kunga of the House of Kinlaza
- Pedro V Ntivila a Nkanga of the House of Kimpanzu (ruled September 1763 – 1764)
- Álvaro XI Nkanga a Nkanga of the House of Kinlaza from Nkondo (ruled May 1764 – 1778)
- José I Mpasi a Nkanga of the House of Kinlaza (ruled 1778–1785)
- Afonso V of Kongo of the House of Kinlaza from Nkondo (ruled 1785–1787)
- Álvaro XII of Kongo of the House of Kinlaza from Nkondo (ruled 1787–unknown)
- Aleixo I Mpanzu a Mbandu (ruled unknown–1793)
- Joaquim I of Kongo (ruled 1793–94)
- Henrique II Masaki ma Mpanzu (ruled 10 January 1794 – 1803)
- Garcia V Nkanga a Mvemba (ruled 1803 – start 1830)
- André II Mvizi a Lukeni (ruled start 1830–1842)
- Henrique III Mpanzu a Nsindi a Nimi a Lukeni (ruled 1842 – January 1857)
- Álvaro XIII of Kongo, also known as Ndongo, (ruled January 1857 – 7 August 1859)
- Pedro V of Kongo, also known as Elelo, (ruled 7 August 1859 – February 1891; signed treaty of vassalage with Portugal in 1888)

=== Portuguese vassalage (1888–1914) ===
Name	Lifespan	Reign start	Reign end	Notes	Family	Image
Pedro V Elelo	Unknown–1891 (aged 31+)	7 August 1859	February 1891	Manikongo. He was a nephew of his Henrique III. Signed a treaty of vassalage with Portugal in 1888. He was the 6th king named Pedro, but signed his correspondence as Pedro V, thus ignoring the Pedro V who had ruled from 1763 to 1764.	Kinlaza	
Álvaro XIV	Unknown – 18 November 1896	February 1891	18 November 1896	Manikongo. He was a nephew of his predecessor. Also known as Água Rosada.	Água Rosada	
Henrique IV of Kongo	1873–1901 (aged 27/28)	1896	1901	Manikongo. He was a half-brother of his predecessor. Also known as Tekenge.	Água Rosada	
Pedro VI of Kongo	1880 – 24 June 1910 (aged 29/30)	1901	1910	Manikongo. He was a nephew of Álvaro XIV. Also known as Mbemba.	Água Rosada	
Manuel Nkomba of Kongo	Unknown – 1911	1910	1911	Manikongo. He was a son of his predecessor. He was not awarded the title of Manuel III.	Água Rosada	
Manuel III of Kongo	1884–1927 (aged 42/43)	1911	1914	Manikongo. He was an uncle of his predecessor. Also known as Kiditu. The Portuguese abolished the title of King of Kongo following the revolt of 1914.	Água Rosada	

=== Pretenders to the throne 1914-2000 ===
- Álvaro XV Afonso of Kongo, also known as Nzinga (ruled 1915–1923)
- Pedro VII Afonso of Kongo (ruled 1923–1955)
- António III Afonso of Kongo (ruled 1955–1957)
- Isabel Maria da Gama of Kongo (f., 1st regency 1957–1962) wife of António III Afonso of Kongo
- Pedro VIII Afonso of Kongo, also known as Mansala (ruled September to October 1962) son of António III Afonso of Kongo
- Isabel Maria da Gama of Kongo (f., 2nd regency 1962–1975) wife of António III Afonso of Kongo
- Interregnum, 1975–2000

=== Pretenders to the throne since 2000 ===
- José II Henrique da Silva Meso (a claimant to the title since 19 November 2000 and said to be the grandson of Pedro VII and living in exile in Cabinda).

The head of the nucleus of the Traditional Authorities of the Royal Court of Kongo is Afonso Mendes and is living in Mbanza-Kongo

- Manuel Alvaro Afonso Nzinga (a claimant to the title since 2004 and living in exile in the United States)
- King Nsola Meso Antônio, King of Mbata and King of Kongo (ruled May 3, 2018 – October 9, 2021) In 2008, the Angolan constitution began to recognize the authority of traditional monarchs in its articles 223 and 224. The now king of Mbata, Nzola Meso Antônio, reorganized the kingdom's court and began to establish diplomatic relations with the other kingdoms originally part of the Greater Congo and, on January 7, 2017, signed the Act of Unification, being crowned on May 3, 2018 as the King of Kongo. King Nsola Meso Antônio died on October 9, 2021, and was succeeded by the young prince Makitu, who was enthroned as King Makitu III on July 29, 2023, after a long and traditional succession process. The ceremony took place at the old São Miguel Fortress, known as Forte Velho de Luanda, and was attended by ambassadors from several countries, such as the United States, Italy, Israel, Mozambique, Norway, and other traditional kingdoms such as Bailundo and Cuanhama.

==== Usurpation ====
Following the usurpation of the title of King of Kongo by certain ill-intentioned individuals, the traditional authorities of Mbanza-Kongo issued a statement on April 17, 2024, declaring that any person claiming to be the King of Kongo is an imposter, as no king has been elected or resides in Mbanza-Kongo today.

"The head of the Department of Tourism at the Provincial Office for Culture, Tourism, Youth, and Sports of Zaire, Abia Graça Fortunato, explained that most of these individuals arrive in Mbanza Kongo as tourists and take advantage of the photos they take with the coordinator of the Lumbu and the director of Culture to carry out their deceptions.

Often, he noted, they welcome visits from both local and foreign tourists to the Museum of the Kings of Congo, where representatives of the Royal Court of the former Kingdom of Kongo work. Unfortunately, some people use these photos to present themselves as kings."

— Fernando Neto, 2024

- Tuzolana Sakibanza Ngiangalele (self-proclaimed monarch since October 5, 2019) is a Congolese painter and former politician, married to Maman Fatuma Mugeni. Known for his artistic talent, he has received numerous awards and traveled widely to promote his work. Politically, he served as a councilor in the municipality of Anderlecht in Brussels and later worked as a diplomat for the African Union in Ethiopia. He eventually chose to leave these roles to focus on his community in the Democratic Republic of the Congo. He also claims the title of traditional leader of Nkolo Fuma and has been involved in projects like Bana Bilaka, an initiative focused on grassroots economic development in the DRC. Despite his local leadership role, he has no recognized historical or blood ties to the monarchy of the Kingdom of Kongo.
- Mfumu Difima (self-proclaimed monarch of the Kongos of Congo Kinshasa since 2018) is a Congolese customary chief as well as the president of the Commission Consultative de règlements des conflits Coutumiers CCRCC LUILA and then the president of the Conseil Supérieur de l'Autorité Traditionnelle et Coutumière CONATC RDC/AFRIQUE. With a degree in physical education, he proclaimed himself King of all Kongos in 2018 on the Pouvoirs d'Afrique programme. Today, he calls himself the King of the Kongos of the Democratic Republic of Congo and continues to present himself outside the territory of the Democratic Republic of Congo as the king of the Kongo people.
- Samuel Masambukidi, also known as Samuel Nitufuidi Masambukidi Kulala kwamakanda II, is the founder of the Lumière du Christ church in the Democratic Republic of the Congo and the spiritual leader of the Masambukidist church. On October 30, 2025, he was crowned in Kinshasa, in Lingala, as the “Divine King of Kongo and King of the Congo Basin” by a group of Congolese from the Democratic Republic of the Congo. The coronation has been widely contested and is considered an act of usurpation, as there is currently no legitimate King of Kongo recognized by the Kongo people or by the customary authorities across the region. Another self-proclaimed claimant, MenguMengu, also declared himself the “King representing Kongo-Central” and was present at the ceremony.

=== Brazilian branch of Palmares ===
The Quilombo dos Palmares was a Maroon Kingdom formed in the Captaincy of Pernambuco in what is now Northeast Brazil sometime around 1605 by princes and nobles from the Kingdom of Kongo. They had been captured during the Battle of Mbwila, and were subsequently transported there as slaves. After escaping slavery, they resumed use of their royal and noble titles. The members of this branch probably belonged to the House of Awenekongo of the Nlaza kanda of Antonio I.

- Ganga Zumba, King (ruled 1630–1678). A son of Princess Aqualtune, daughter of an unidentified king of Kongo. She was present at the Battle of Mbwila.
- Ganga Zona, King (ruled 1678–1678). A brother of Ganga Zumba.
- Zumbi, also known as Francisco, King (ruled 1678–1695). A nephew of Ganga Zumba, son of his sister Princess Sabina. Today, a National Hero in Brazil.
- Camuanga, King (ruled 1695–?). A son of Zumbi and the last known member of the lineage in the Americas.

== See also ==
- Kingdom of Kongo
- Kongo Civil War
- Kanda
- Kinkanga
- Kimpanzu
- Kinlaza
- Água Rosada
- History of Angola
