= 1567 =

1567 in various calendars
- Gregorian calendar: 1567; MDLXVII
- Ab urbe condita: 2320
- Armenian calendar: 1016; ԹՎ ՌԺԶ
- Assyrian calendar: 6317
- Balinese saka calendar: 1488–1489
- Bengali calendar: 973–974
- Berber calendar: 2517
- English Regnal year: 9 Eliz. 1 – 10 Eliz. 1
- Buddhist calendar: 2111
- Burmese calendar: 929
- Byzantine calendar: 7075–7076
- Chinese calendar: 丙寅年 (Fire Tiger); 4264 or 4057 — to — 丁卯年 (Fire Rabbit); 4265 or 4058
- Coptic calendar: 1283–1284
- Discordian calendar: 2733
- Ethiopian calendar: 1559–1560
- Hebrew calendar: 5327–5328
- Hindu calendars
- Vikram Samvat: 1623–1624
- Shaka Samvat: 1488–1489
- Kali Yuga: 4667–4668
- Holocene calendar: 11567
- Igbo calendar: 567–568
- Iranian calendar: 945–946
- Islamic calendar: 974–975
- Japanese calendar: Eiroku 10 (永禄１０年)
- Javanese calendar: 1486–1487
- Julian calendar: 1567; MDLXVII
- Korean calendar: 3900
- Minguo calendar: 345 before ROC 民前345年
- Nanakshahi calendar: 99
- Thai solar calendar: 2109–2110
- Tibetan calendar: མེ་ཕོ་སྟག་ལོ་ (male Fire-Tiger); 1693 or 1312 or 540 — to — མེ་མོ་ཡོས་ལོ་ (female Fire-Hare); 1694 or 1313 or 541

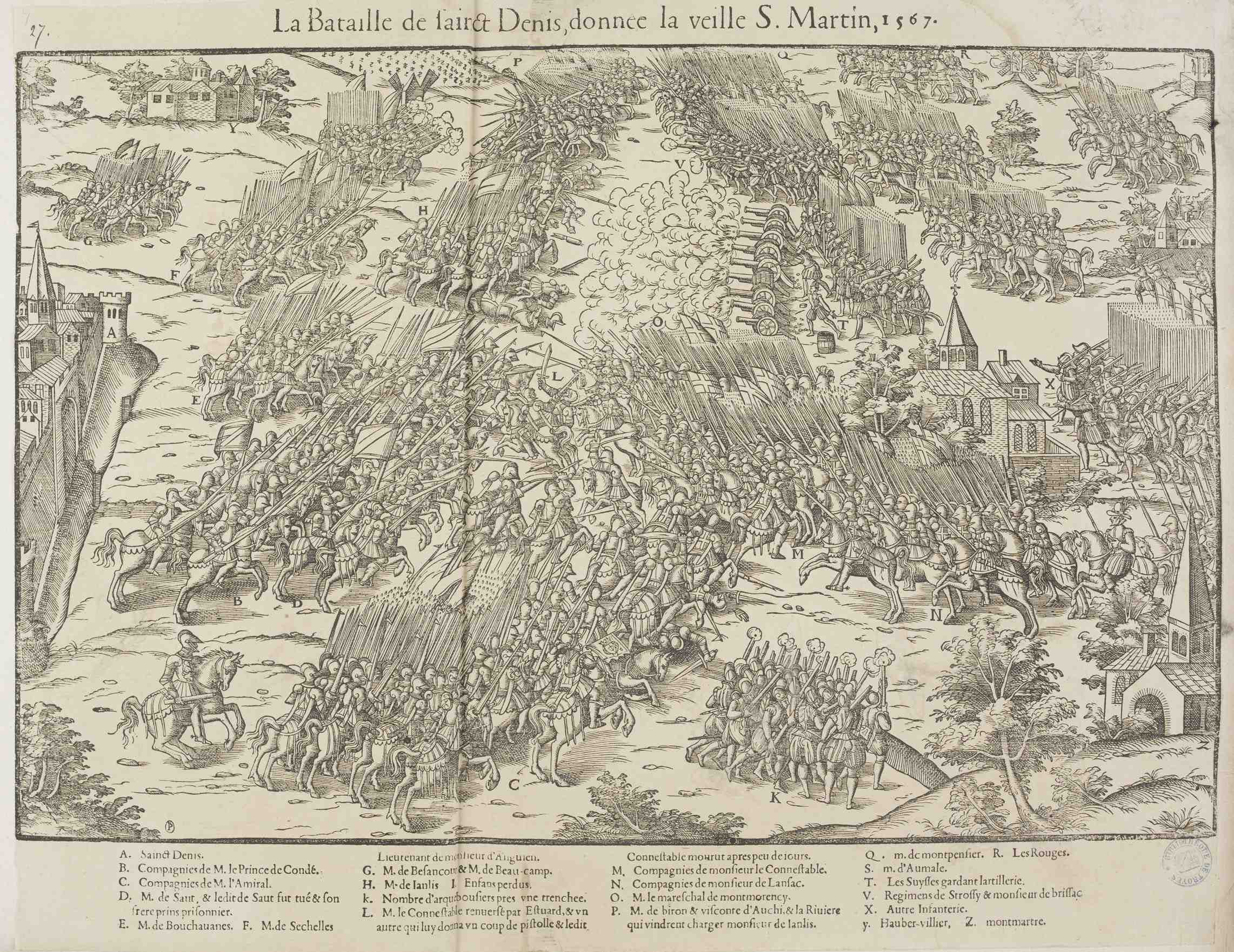
November 10: Battle of Saint-Denis.

Year 1567 (MDLXVII) was a common year starting on Wednesday of the Julian calendar.

== Events ==
=== January–March ===
- January 20 – Battle of Rio de Janeiro: Portuguese forces under the command of Estácio de Sá definitively drive the French out of Rio de Janeiro.
- January 23 – After 45 years' reign, the Jiajing Emperor, Zhu Houcong, dies in the Forbidden City of China.
- January – A Spanish force under the command of Captain Juan Pardo establishes Fort San Juan, in the Native American settlement of Joara. The fort is the first European settlement in modern-day North Carolina.
- February 4 – Prince Zhu Zaiji, son of the Jiajing Emperor, ascends the throne of Ming dynasty China as the Longqing Emperor.
- February 10 – Henry Stuart, Lord Darnley, husband of Mary, Queen of Scots, is murdered at the Provost's House in Kirk o' Field, Edinburgh.
- March 13 – Battle of Oosterweel: A Spanish mercenary army surprises and kills a band of rebels near Antwerp in the Habsburg Netherlands, beginning the Eighty Years' War.

=== April–June ===
- April 9 – In India, the Battle of Thanesar is fought in what becomes the state of Haryana. The Mughal Emperor Akbar, with 300 men, wins a victory over more than 7,000 warriors of the Sanyasi Hindu sect. Akbar's army has two cannons, 400 rifles and 75 elephants.
- April 10 – Henrique I Nerika a Mpudi becomes the new ruler of the Kingdom of Kongo in what becomes the western part of the Democratic Republic of the Congo and the northern portion of Angola. Henrique succeeds his nephew, Bernardo I of Kongo.
- April 12 – The Earl of Bothwell is acquitted on charges of murder in the February 10 killing of Lord Darnley, the husband of Mary Queen of Scots. Upon acquittal he makes plans to become Mary's new husband.
- April 20 – The Ainslie Tavern Bond is signed by a group of Scottish clerics and nobles, recommending Bothwell as an appropriate husband for Queen Mary and approving his acquittal after trial for the murder of her previous husband.
- April 24 – Bothwell takes Mary prisoner at his castle at Dunbar after preventing her from traveling from her palace to Edinburgh, then rapes her.
- May 15 – Mary, Queen of Scots, marries the Earl of Bothwell, under duress.
- May 24 – Sture Murders: The mentally unstable King Erik XIV of Sweden and his guards murder five incarcerated nobles at Uppsala Castle.
- June 15 – Mary, Queen of Scots, is defeated by Scottish nobles at the Battle of Carberry Hill and imprisoned in Lochleven Castle.

=== July–September ===
- July 24 – Mary, Queen of Scots, is forced to abdicate, and replaced by her one-year-old son James VI.
- July 25 – The city of Santiago de León de Caracas is founded by Diego de Losada.
- July 29 – James VI is crowned at Stirling.
- August 22 – The Duke of Alba is sent to the Netherlands with a strong Spanish force, to suppress unrest there. He replaces Margaret of Parma as Governor of the Netherlands. Prince William of Orange is outlawed, and Lamoral, Count of Egmont imprisoned.
- September 9 – At a dinner, the Duke of Alba arrests Lamoral, Count of Egmont and Philip de Montmorency, Count of Horn for treason.
- September 27 – After the 2-week Siege of Inabayama Castle, the Oda clan capture Gifu Castle from the Saitō clan in Japan.
- September 29 – The Second War of Religion begins in France, when Louis I, Prince of Condé and Gaspard de Coligny fail in an attempt to capture King Charles IX and his mother at Meaux. The Huguenots do capture several cities (including Orléans), and march on Paris.

=== October–December ===
- October 7 – Bible translations into Welsh: The New Testament is first published in Welsh, in William Salesbury's translation from the Greek.
- November 10 – Battle of Saint-Denis: Anne de Montmorency, 1st Duke of Montmorency, with 16,000 Royalists, falls on Condé's 3,500 Huguenots. The Huguenots surprisingly hold on for some hours before being driven off. Montmorency is mortally wounded.
- November 21 (10th day of 11th month, Eiroku 10) – In Japan, the Tōdai-ji Great Buddha Hall in the Nara Prefecture is destroyed after a six-month siege by Matsunaga Hisahide against Miyoshi Nagaitsu and the Miyoshi clan. Reconstruction of the temple does not take place until 140 years later in 1709.
- December 4 – Antão de Noronha, Viceroy of Portuguese India (the modern-day Indian state of Goa) issues decrees prohibiting the public performance of Hindu rituals for marriages, cremations, and sacred thread wearing. Other rules require all natives 15 or older to attend Christian religious services, upon penalty of punishment.
- December 12 – The Scottish Parliament votes to approve the Act Anent the demission of the Crown in favour of our Sovereign Lord, and his Majesty's Coronation 1567, an act regarding the abdication of Mary Queen of Scots in favor of her son James VI and the coronation of James, and confirms James as the legal ruler. Mary's half brother, James Stewart, 1st Earl of Moray, is appointed as the regent to rule on behalf of the 18-month-old King of Scotland. In that Moray is absent from Scotland at the time, the Parliament appoints a committee of seven deputy regents to rule on behalf of Moray's power to rule on behalf of King James.

=== Date unknown ===
- King Frederick II of Denmark and Norway founds Fredrikstad in Norway.
- Construction of Villa Capra "La Rotonda" in Vicenza, designed by Andrea Palladio, begins. It will be one of the most influential designs in the history of architecture.
- Rugby School, one of the oldest public schools in England, is founded.
- Although sparse maritime trade existed since its founding, the Ming dynasty government of China officially revokes the haijin maritime trade ban, reinstating foreign trade with all countries except Japan.

== Births ==
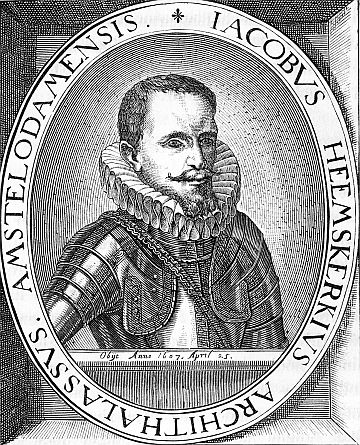
Jacob van Heemskerk

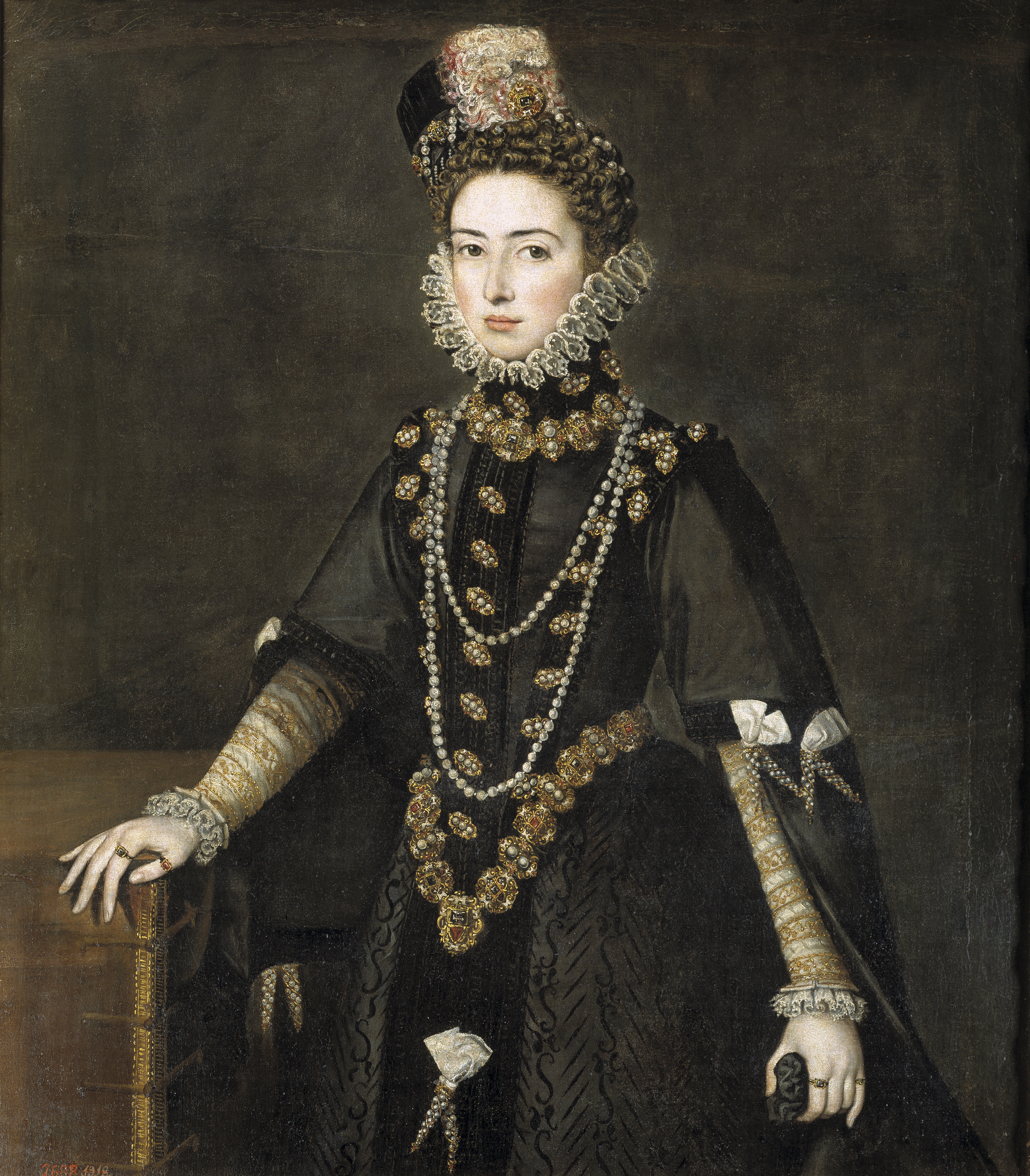
Infanta Catalina Micaela of Spain

- January 1 – Fabio Colonna, Italian scientist (d. 1640)
- January 4 – François d'Aguilon, Belgian Jesuit mathematician (d. 1617)
- January 25 – Archduchess Margaret of Austria (d. 1633)
- January 27 – Anna Maria of Hesse-Kassel, Countess Consort of Nassau-Saarbrücke (d. 1626)
- February 3 – Anna Maria of Brandenburg, Duchess Consort of Pomerania (d. 1618)
- February 12 – Thomas Campion, English poet and composer (d. 1620)
- February 23 – Elisabeth of Brunswick-Wolfenbüttel, Countess of Holstein-Schauenburg and Duchess Consort of Brunswick-Harburg (d. 1618)
- February 24 – Jindřich Matyáš Thurn, Swedish general (d. 1640)
- March 13 (bapt.) – Jacob van Heemskerk, Dutch admiral and explorer (d. 1607)
- March 17 – Akizuki Tanenaga, Japanese samurai and soldier (d. 1614)
- April 10 – John Louis I, Count of Nassau-Wiesbaden-Idstein, Germany noble (d. 1596)
- April 26 – Nicolas Formé, French composer (d. 1638)
- May 2 – Sebald de Weert, Dutch captain, vice-admiral of the Dutch East India Company (d. 1603)
- May 9 – John George I, Prince of Anhalt-Dessau (1603–1618) (d. 1618)
- May 13 – Don Giovanni de' Medici, Italian military commander and diplomat (d. 1621)
- May 15 – Claudio Monteverdi, Italian composer (d. 1643)
- June 25 – Jacob Ulfeldt, Danish politician (d. 1630)
- August 14 – Luigi Caponaro, Italian healer (d. 1622)
- August 15 – Philip III, Margrave of Baden-Rodemachern (1588–1620) (d. 1620)
- August 21 – Francis de Sales, Savoyard Bishop of Geneva and saint (d. 1622)
- September – Edward Sutton, 5th Baron Dudley, English landowner (d. 1643)
- September 2 – György Thurzó, Palatine of Hungary (d. 1616)
- September 5 – Date Masamune, Japanese daimyō (d. 1636)
- September 24 – Martin Fréminet, French painter (d. 1619)
- October 10 – Infanta Catalina Micaela of Spain (d. 1597)
- November
  - Thomas Nashe, English poet (d. 1600)
  - Minye Kyawswa II of Ava, last crown prince of the Toungoo Empire (Burma) (d. 1599)
- November 1 – Diego Sarmiento de Acuña, 1st Count of Gondomar, Spanish diplomat (d. 1626)
- November 7 – Margherita Farnese, Benedictine nun (d. 1643)
- November 14 – Maurice of Nassau, Prince of Orange (d. 1625)
- November 16 – Anna of Saxony, German noblewoman (d. 1613)
- November 21 – Anne de Xainctonge, French religious (d. 1621)
- December 15 – Christoph Demantius, German composer (d. 1643)
- December 18
  - Cornelius a Lapide, Jesuit exegete (d. 1637)
  - Tachibana Muneshige, Japanese samurai and soldier (d. 1643)
- date unknown
  - Isabel Barreto, Spanish admiral (d. 1612)
  - Pierre Biard, French settler and Jesuit missionary (d. 1622)
  - Adriaen Block, Dutch fur trader and navigator (d. 1624)
  - Jacques Clément, French assassin of Henry III of France (d. 1589)
  - Arima Harunobu, Japanese Christian daimyō (d. 1612)
  - John Parkinson, English herbalist and botanist (d. 1650)
  - Willem Schouten, Dutch navigator (d. 1625)
  - Torii Tadamasa, Japanese nobleman (d. 1628)
  - Sanada Yukimura, Japanese samurai and soldier (d. 1615)
  - Ban Naoyuki, Japanese samurai and soldier (d. 1615)

== Deaths ==
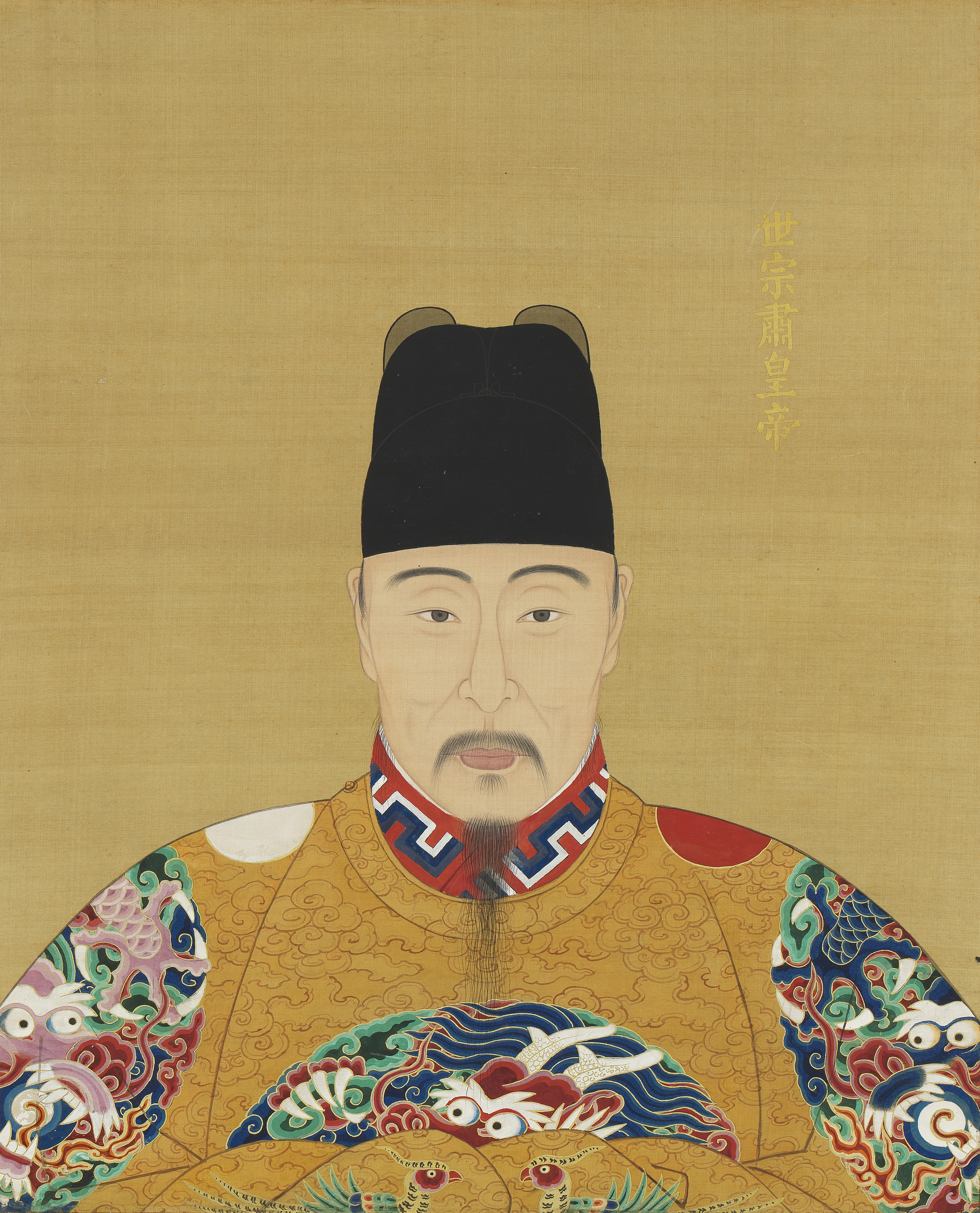
Emperor Jiajing

- January 12 – Eva von Trott, German noble and courtier (b. 1505)
- January 17 – Sampiero Corso, Corsican mercenary leader (b. 1498)
- January 23 – Jiajing Emperor of China (b. 1507)
- January 26 – Nicholas Wotton, English diplomat (c. b. 1497)
- February 10 – Henry Stuart, Lord Darnley, consort of Mary, Queen of Scots (b. 1545)
- February 20 – Estácio de Sá, Portuguese officer, founder of Rio de Janeiro (b. 1520)
- March 31 – Philip I, Landgrave of Hesse (b. 1504)
- April 1 – Jan Krzysztof Tarnowski, Polish nobleman (b. 1537)
- April 2 – Ernest III, Duke of Brunswick-Grubenhagen (b. 1518)
- April 18 – Wilhelm von Grumbach, German adventurer (b. 1503)
- April 19 – Michael Stifel, German mathematician (b. 1487)
- May 2 – Marin Držić, Croatian writer (b. 1508)
- June 2 – Shane O'Neill, Irish chieftain (b. 1530)
- June 12 – Richard Rich, Lord Chancellor of England (b. 1496)
- June 19 – Anna of Brandenburg, Duchess of Mecklenburg-Güstrow (b. 1507)
- August 3 – Myeongjong of Joseon, ruler of Korea (b. 1534)
- August 18 – Enea Vico, Italian engraver (b. 1523)
- October 1 – Pietro Carnesecchi, Italian humanist (b. 1508)
- October 31 – Marie of Brandenburg-Kulmbach, Princess of Brandenburg-Kulmbach and by marriage Electress Palatine (b. 1519)
- November 12 – Anne de Montmorency, 1st Duke of Montmorency, Constable of France (b. 1493)
- November 13 – Pedro de la Gasca, viceroy of Peru (b. 1485)
- November 19 – Takeda Yoshinobu, Japanese daimyō (b. 1538)
- date unknown
  - Thomas Beccon, English Protestant reformer (b. 1511)
  - Péter Erdődy, ban of Croatia (b. 1504)
  - Shahghali, khan of Qasim (b. 1505)
  - Lawrence Sheriff, English gentleman and grocer to Elizabeth I (b. 1510)
  - Akagawa Motoyasu, Japanese samurai
