= 1561 =

1561 in various calendars
- Gregorian calendar: 1561; MDLXI
- Ab urbe condita: 2314
- Armenian calendar: 1010; ԹՎ ՌԺ
- Assyrian calendar: 6311
- Balinese saka calendar: 1482–1483
- Bengali calendar: 967–968
- Berber calendar: 2511
- English Regnal year: 3 Eliz. 1 – 4 Eliz. 1
- Buddhist calendar: 2105
- Burmese calendar: 923
- Byzantine calendar: 7069–7070
- Chinese calendar: 庚申年 (Metal Monkey); 4258 or 4051 — to — 辛酉年 (Metal Rooster); 4259 or 4052
- Coptic calendar: 1277–1278
- Discordian calendar: 2727
- Ethiopian calendar: 1553–1554
- Hebrew calendar: 5321–5322
- Hindu calendars
- Vikram Samvat: 1617–1618
- Shaka Samvat: 1482–1483
- Kali Yuga: 4661–4662
- Holocene calendar: 11561
- Igbo calendar: 561–562
- Iranian calendar: 939–940
- Islamic calendar: 968–969
- Japanese calendar: Eiroku 4 (永禄４年)
- Javanese calendar: 1480–1481
- Julian calendar: 1561; MDLXI
- Korean calendar: 3894
- Minguo calendar: 351 before ROC 民前351年
- Nanakshahi calendar: 93
- Thai solar calendar: 2103–2104
- Tibetan calendar: ལྕགས་ཕོ་སྤྲེ་ལོ་ (male Iron-Monkey); 1687 or 1306 or 534 — to — ལྕགས་མོ་བྱ་ལོ་ (female Iron-Bird); 1688 or 1307 or 535

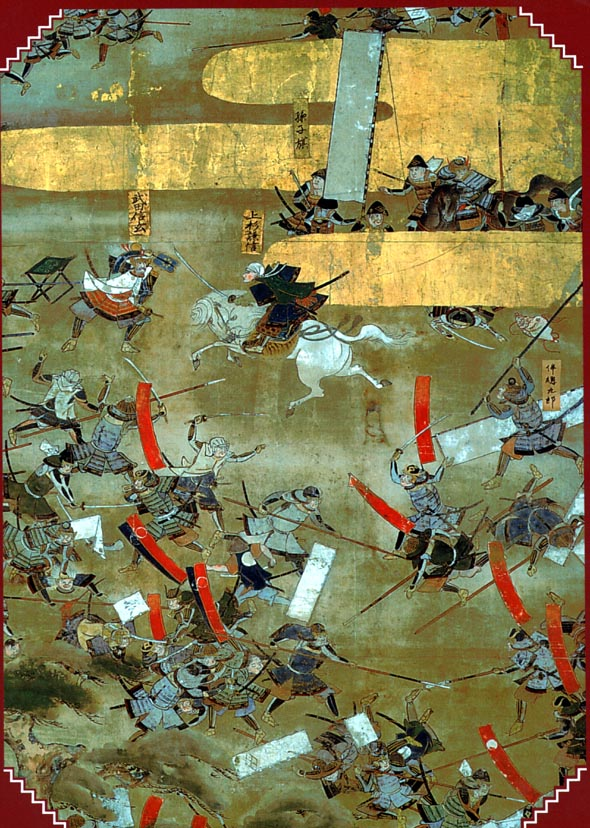
October 18: Fourth Battle of Kawanakajima.

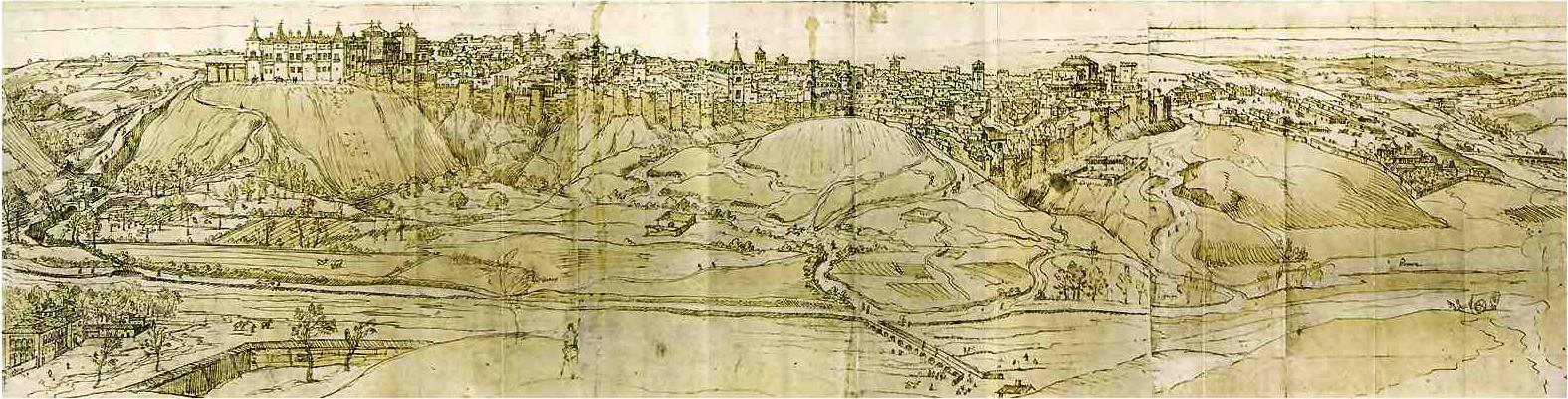
May 8: Madrid is the new capital of Spain.

Year 1561 (MDLXI) was a common year starting on Wednesday of the Julian calendar.

== Events ==
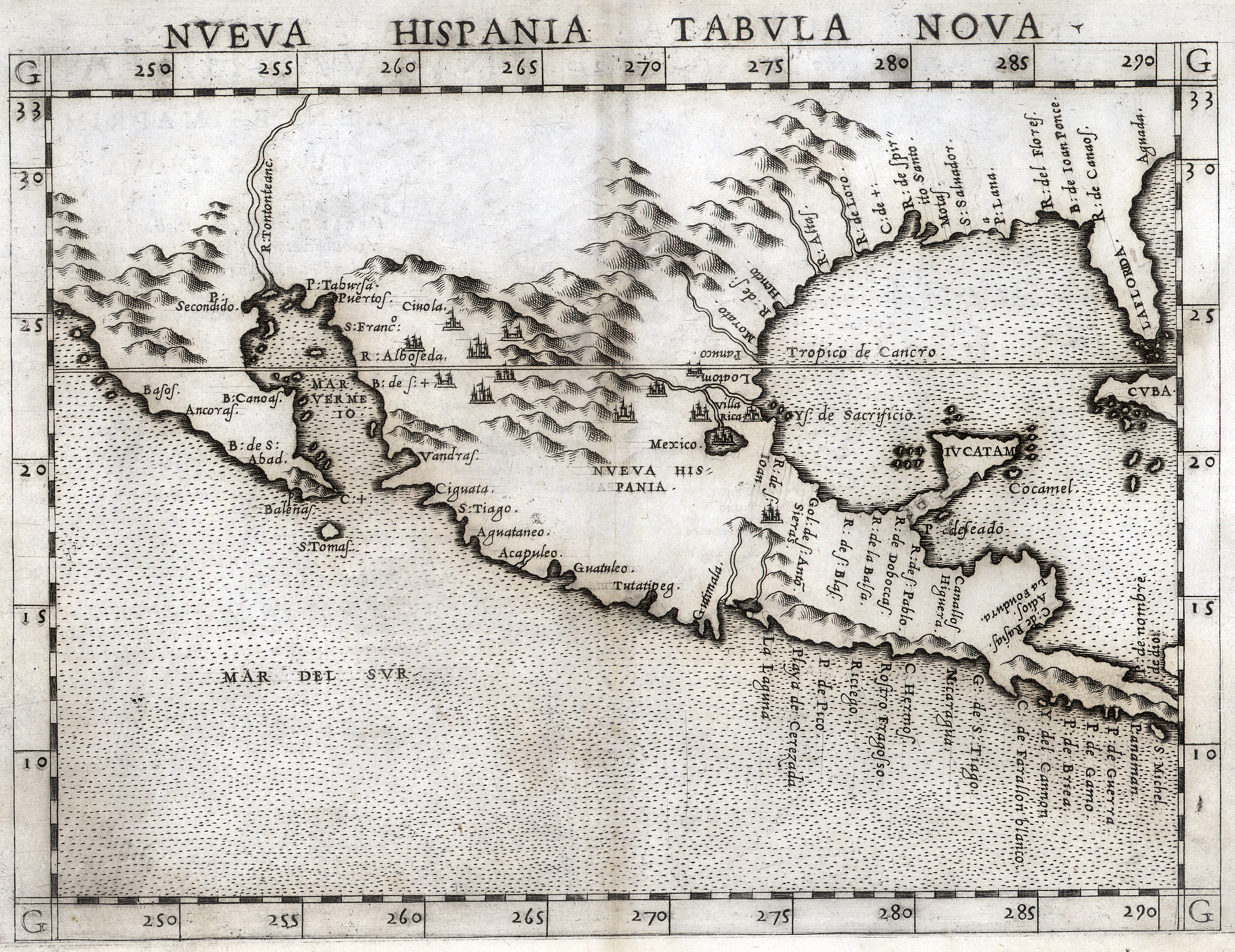
Map of New Spain in 1561

=== January–March ===
- January 4 – Paolo Battista Giudice Calvi is elected as the new Doge of the Republic of Genoa, but serves for only eight months before dying in September.
- January 31
  - The Ordinance of Orléans suspends the persecution of the Protestant Huguenots in Kingdom of France.
  - Mughal Empire General Bairam Khan is assassinated by an Afghan warrior, Mubarak Khan Lohani, while traveling through Gujarat in India.
- February 13 – Queen Elizabeth of England summons the Ambassador from Spain, Álvaro de la Quadra, for a private audience to ask how the Spanish government would react if she were to marry Robert Dudley, 1st Earl of Leicester, who had recently lost his wife Amy Robsart in a questionable accident.
- March 23 – Lope de Aguirre, a Basque Spanish conquistador, begins a rebellion against the Spanish Crown in an attempt to take over most of Spanish South America.
- March 29 – In India, the Mughal Empire Army, led by General Adham Khan defeats the Sultanate of Malwa in a battle at Sarangpur, forcing the Sultan Baz Bahadur to flee.

=== April–June ===
- April 9 – Ángel de Villafañe becomes the new Governor of Spanish Florida, assuming authority over the provinces of La Florida and of Punta de Santa Elena (now Parris Island in the U.S. state of South Carolina).
- April 14 – The citizens of Nuremberg see what appears to be an aerial battle, followed by the appearance of a large black triangular object and a large crash (with smoke) outside the city. A news notice (an early form of newspaper) is printed on April 14, describing the event.
- April 17 – Diego López de Zúñiga, 4th Count of Nieva becomes the fourth Spanish Viceroy of Peru, administering most of South America after the death on March 30 of Andrés Hurtado de Mendoza.
- April 19 – The Edict of 19 April, confirming the recent recommendation by the Estates General, is promulgated by the regency council for King Charles IX of France in an attempt to prevent a civil war between the Roman Catholic and the Protestant Huguenot citizens of France
- May 8 – Madrid is declared the capital of Spain, by Philip II.
- June 4
  - The spire of Old St Paul's Cathedral in the City of London catches fire and crashes through the nave roof, probably as the result of a lightning strike. The spire is not rebuilt.
  - The nobility of Harrien-Wierland and the town of Reval (on June 6) of the Livonian Order swear allegiance to Sweden.
- June 25 – Francis Coxe, an English astrologer, is pilloried at Cheapside in London, and makes a public confession of his involvement in "sinistral and divelysh artes".
- June 29 – Erik XIV is crowned King of Sweden.

=== July–September ===
- July 12 – Saint Basil's Cathedral in Moscow (started in 1534) is finished.
- July – Arauco War: The hated encomendero Pedro de Avendaño and two other Spaniards are killed, triggering the Second Great Rebellion of the Mapuche.
- August 19 – Mary, Queen of Scots, is denied passage through England after returning from France. She arrives at Leith, Scotland later the same day.
- August 20 – English merchant Anthony Jenkinson arrives in Moscow on his second expedition to the Grand Duchy of Moscow.
- September 2 – The Entry of Mary, Queen of Scots into Edinburgh, a civic celebration for the Queen of Scotland, is marred by religious controversy.
- September 28 – An inconclusive three day debate begins in Maybole, Ayrshire, Scotland between Protestant reformer John Knox and Quintin Kennedy, commendator of Crossraguel Abbey, on transubstantiation. The Reformation, confirmed by the Scottish government in 1560, continues.

=== October–December ===
- October 10 – The Siege of Moji in Japan ends with the defenders retaining their position.
- October 18 – Fourth Battle of Kawanakajima: Takeda Shingen defeats Uesugi Kenshin, in the climax of their ongoing conflicts.
- November 4 – Upon the death of his father, Diogo I Nkumbi a Mpudi, King Afonso II Mpemba a Nzinga becomes the new monarch of the Kingdom of Kongo, located in what is now the southern portion of the Democratic Republic of Congo and the northern portion of Angola. Afonso II reigns for less than a month before being overthrown by his brother, Bernardo.
- November 28 – The Treaty of Vilnius is concluded during the Livonian War, between the Livonian Confederation and the Polish–Lithuanian Commonwealth. With the treaty, the non-Danish and non-Swedish part of Livonia, with the exception of the Free imperial city of Riga, subjects itself to Polish king and Grand Duke of Lithuania, Sigismund II Augustus with the Pacta subiectionis (Provisio ducalis). In turn, Sigismund grants protection from the Tsardom of Russia, and confirms the Livonian estates' traditional privileges, laid out in the Privilegium Sigismundi Augusti.
- December 1 – In the Kingdom of Kongo, Bernardo Mpemba a Nzinga overthrows his brother, King Afonso II, and becomes King Bernardo I.

=== Date unknown ===
- Merchant Taylors' School is founded in the City of London by Sir Thomas White, Sir Richard Hilles, Emanuel Lucar, and Stephen Hales.
- The first Calvinists settle in England, after fleeing Flanders.
- The Anglo-Genevan metrical psalter is published, including the Old 100th, the version of the hymn All People That on Earth Do Dwell made from Psalm 100, attributed to the probably-Scottish clergyman and biblical translator William Kethe, exiled in Geneva.
- Ruy López de Segura develops modern techniques of chess playing in Spain.
- William Baldwin's Beware the Cat (written early 1553), an early example of extended fiction (specifically horror fiction) in English, is published anonymously in London. This edition appears to have been suppressed, and no copies survive.
- Between 1561 and 1670, 3,229 alleged witches are executed in southwestern Germany, most by burning.

== Births ==
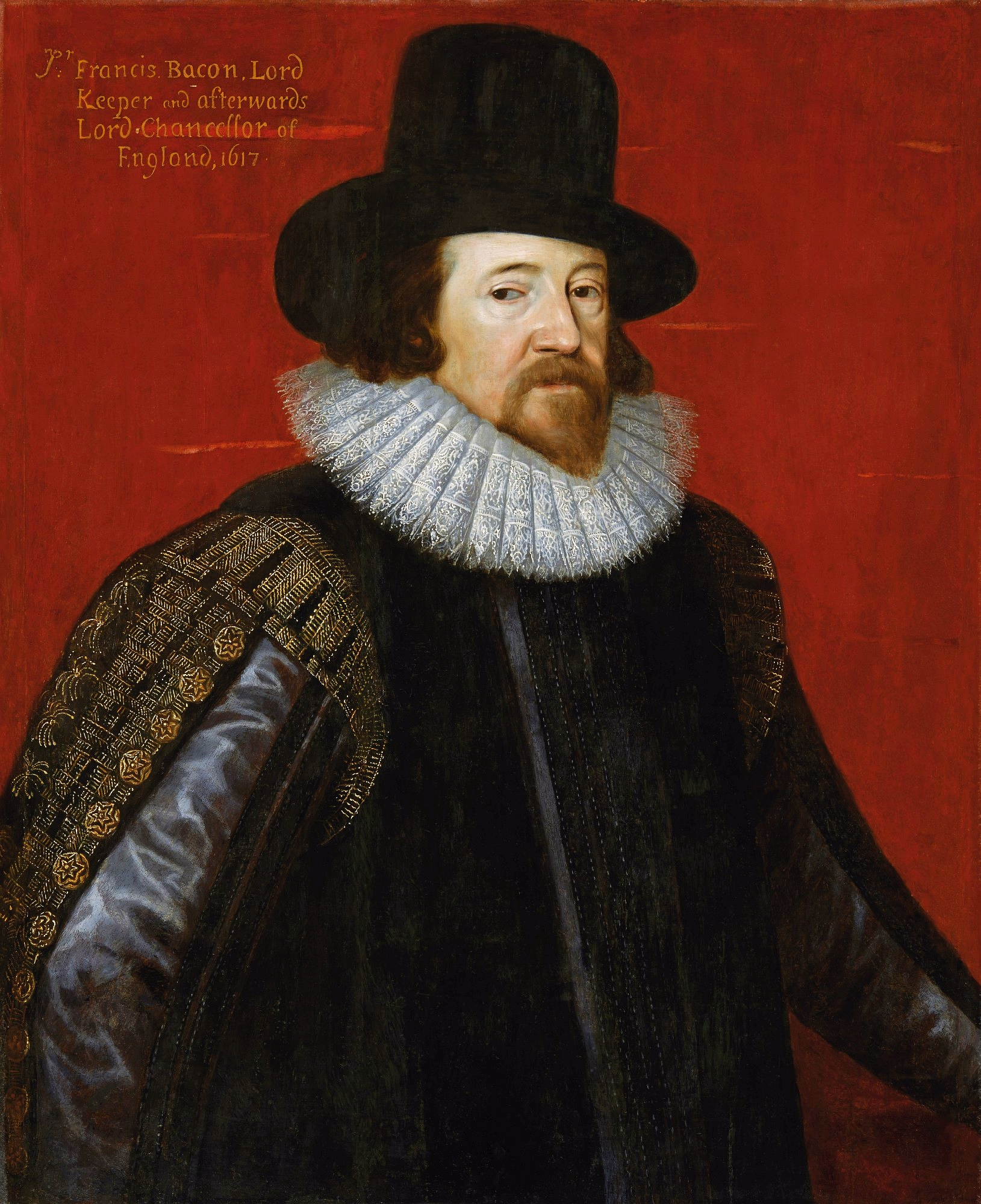
Francis Bacon

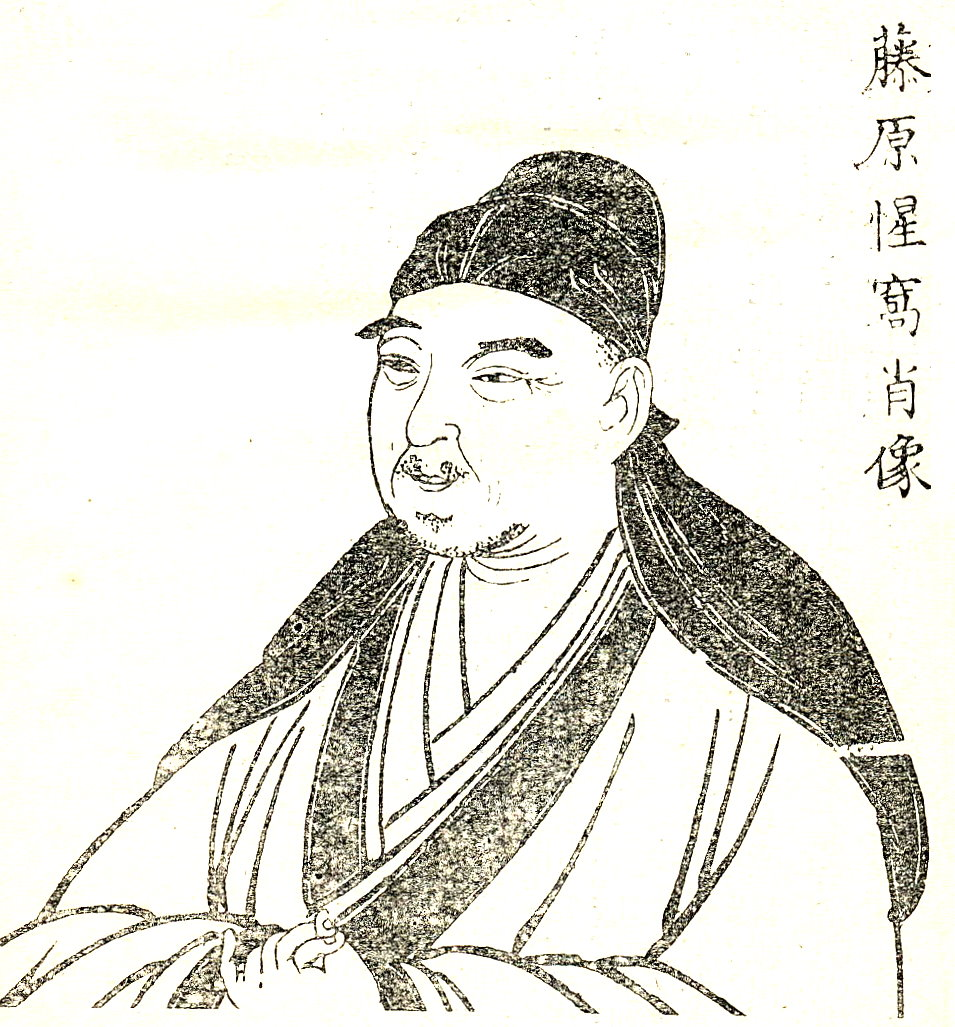
Fujiwara Seika

- January 1 – Thomas Walsingham, English literary patron (d. 1630)
- January 6 – Thomas Fincke, Danish mathematician and physicist (d. 1656)
- January 22 – Sir Francis Bacon, English philosopher, scientist, and statesman (d. 1626)
- January 24 – Camillo Cortellini, Italian composer (d. 1630)
- February 1 – Henry Briggs, British mathematician (d. 1630)
- February 8 – Fujiwara Seika, Japanese philosopher (d. 1619)
- February 15 – Johannetta of Sayn-Wittgenstein, German noblewoman (d. 1622)
- February 25 – Edward Talbot, 8th Earl of Shrewsbury, English politician and earl (d. 1617)
- March 9 – Archduke Wenceslaus of Austria, Archduke of Austria (d. 1578)
- March 29 – Santorio Santorio, Italian biologist (d. 1636)
- April 8
  - Thiri Thudhamma Yaza of Martaban, Viceroy of Martaban (d. 1584)
  - Dominicus Baudius, Dutch historian and poet (d. 1613)
- June – Samuel Harsnett, Archbishop of York (d. 1631)
- June 7 – John VII, Count of Nassau-Siegen (d. 1623)
- June 12 – Anna of Württemberg, German princess (d. 1616)
- June 13 – Anna Maria of Anhalt, German noblewoman (d. 1605)
- June 20 (bapt.) – Richard Whitbourne, English colonist of Newfoundland (d. 1635)
- June 24 – Matthias Hafenreffer, German Lutheran theologian (d. 1619)
- June 26 – Erdmuthe of Brandenburg, Duchess of Pomerania-Stettin (d. 1623)
- July 2 – Christoph Grienberger, Austrian astronomer (d. 1636)
- July 11 – Luís de Góngora y Argote, Spanish poet (d. 1627)
- July 17 – Jacopo Corsi, Italian composer (d. 1602)
- July 24 – Maria of the Palatinate-Simmern, Duchess consort of Södermanland (1579–1589) (d. 1589)
- August 14 – Christopher Heydon, English politician (d. 1623)
- August 20 – Jacopo Peri, Italian composer (d. 1633)
- August 24
  - Thomas Howard, 1st Earl of Suffolk (d. 1626)
  - Bartholomaeus Pitiscus, German astronomer and mathematician (d. 1613)
- August 25 – Philippe van Lansberge, Dutch astronomer (d. 1632)
- September 1 – Gervase Helwys, English murderer (d. 1615)
- September 3 – Yi Ŏkki, Korean admiral (d. 1597)
- September 10 – Hernando Arias de Saavedra, Spanish colonial governor (d. 1634)
- September 21 – Edward Seymour, Viscount Beauchamp, son of Edward Seymour Sr. (d. 1612)
- September 28 – Roland Lytton, English politician (d. 1615)
- September 29 – Adriaan van Roomen, Belgian mathematician (d. 1615)
- October 11 (bapt.) – Thomas Lake, English Secretary of State to King James I (d. 1630)
- October 15 – Richard Field, English cathedral dean (d. 1616)
- October 24 – Anthony Babington, English criminal (d. 1586)
- October 27 – Mary Sidney, English writer, patroness and translator (d. 1621)
- November 1 – Francesco Usper, Italian composer (d. 1641)
- November 16 – Andreas Angelus, German pastor, teacher, chronicler of the Mark of Brandenburg (d. 1598)
- December 1 – Sophie Hedwig of Brunswick-Wolfenbüttel, duchess consort of Pomerania-Wolgast (1577–1592) (d. 1631)
- December 7 – Kikkawa Hiroie, Japanese politician (d. 1625)
- December 9 – Edwin Sandys, English founder of the colony of Virginia (d. 1629)
- December 16 – Amandus Polanus, German theologian of early Reformed orthodoxy (d. 1610)
- date unknown – Stephen Bachiler, non-conformist minister and pioneer settler of New England (d. 1656)

== Deaths ==
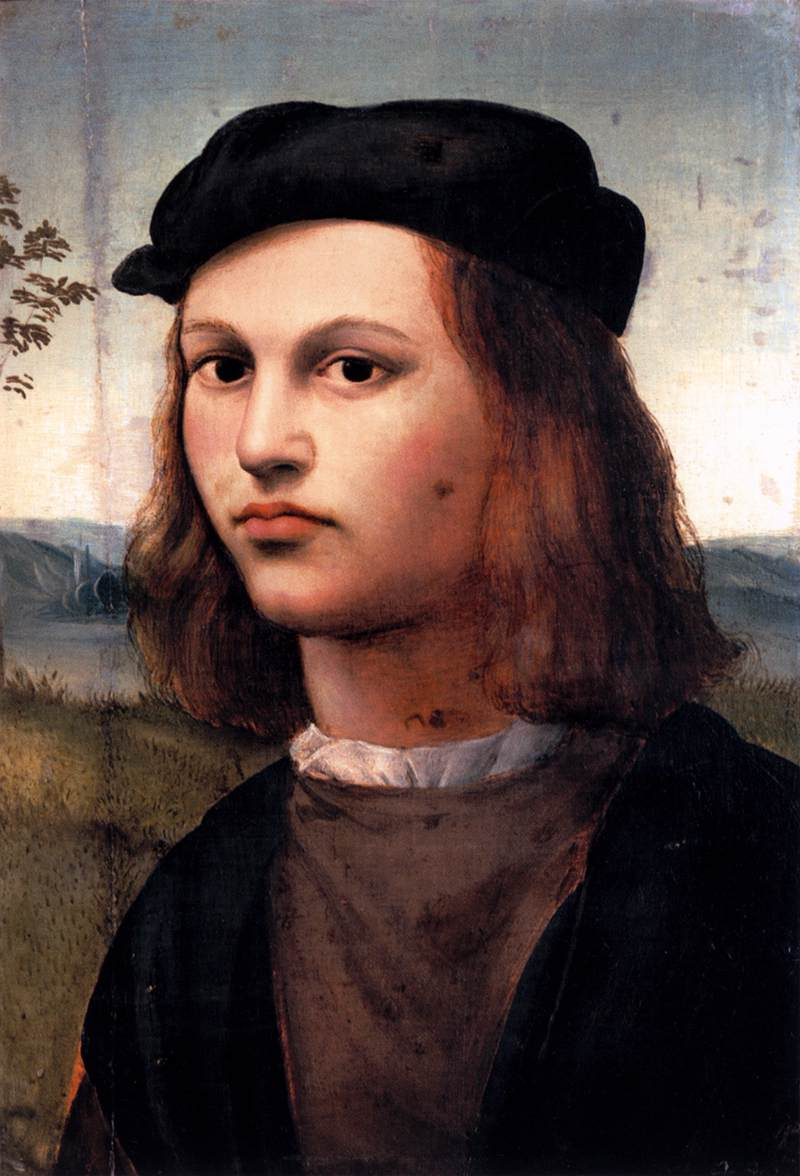
Ridolfo Ghirlandaio

- January 9 – Amago Haruhisa, Japanese samurai and warlord (b. 1514)
- January 13 – Frederick Magnus I, Count of Solms-Laubach, (b. 1521)
- January 31
  - Menno Simons, Anabaptist religious leader and Mennonite founder (b. 1496)
  - Bairam Khan, Turkoman noble and poet (assassinated)
- February 13 – Francis I, Duke of Nevers (b. 1516)
- February 26 – Jorge de Montemor, Spanish writer (b. 1520)
- March 6 – Gonçalo da Silveira, Portuguese Jesuit missionary (b. 1526)
- March 24 – Giulio d'Este, illegitimate son of Italian noble (b. 1478)
- March 25 – Conrad Lycosthenes, humanist and encyclopedist (b. 1518)
- March 28 – Bartholomeus V. Welser, German banker (b. 1484)
- April 9 – Jean Quintin, French priest, knight and writer (b. 1500)
- May 4 – Karl I, Prince of Anhalt-Zerbst, German prince (b. 1534)
- May 16 – Jan Tarnowski, Polish noble (b. 1488)
- June 23 – Saitō Yoshitatsu, Japanese daimyō (b. 1527)
- June 6 – Ridolfo Ghirlandaio, Italian painter (b. 1483)
- July 9 – Sebald Heyden, German musicologist and theologian (b. 1499)
- July 19 – Henry Lauder, Lord St Germains, Lord Advocate of Scotland
- September 1 – Edward Waldegrave, English politician and recusant
- September 25 – Sehzade Bayezid, Ottoman Prince (b. 1525)
- October 27 – Lope de Aguirre, Basque rebel and conquistador (b. 1510)
- November 7 – Jeanne de Jussie, Swiss nun and writer (b. 1503)
- November 11 – Hans Tausen, Danish reformer (b. 1494)
- December 6 – Joachim I, Prince of Anhalt-Dessau, German prince (b. 1509)
- December 10 – Caspar Schwenckfeld, German theologian
- date unknown
  - Marie Dentière, Genevan Protestant reformer and theologian (b. 1495)
  - Claude Garamond, French publisher (b. 1480)
  - Ijuin Tadaaki, Japanese noble (b. 1520)
- probable – Luis de Milán, Spanish composer (b. 1500)
