= Nlaza of Kongo =

Nlaza
- Mwene Kongo
- Reign: c. 1435-c. 1450
- Predecessor: Nanga
- Successor: Nkuwu a Ntinu
- Born: c. 1407
- Died: c. 1450 (aged at least 42/43)
- Dynasty: Lukeni kanda

Nlaza of Kongo was a manikongo from the Lukeni kanda dynasty and the 3rd ruler of the Central African kingdom of Kongo in the early 15th century. Little is known about him or his reign other than he was one of two cousins of Kongo's founder, Lukeni lua Nimi.

He and Quinanga of Kongo were kings between Lukeni lua Nimi, the first king, and Nkuwu a Ntinu, the fourth.

== See also ==
- Kingdom of Kongo
- List of rulers of Kongo

Preceded by Nanga	Manikongo c. 1435-c. 1450	Succeeded by Nkuwu a Ntinu
