= Nanga =

Nanga may be:

- Nanga (instrument), an Egyptian musical instrument
- Nanga (Japanese painting)
- Nanga Brook, Western Australia
- Nanga Pinoh, Indonesia
- Nanga of Kongo, second ruler or manikongo of the Central African kingdom of Kongo
- Nanga subcaste of the Sial (tribe) in Pakistan
- N'anga, name of African traditional healer in Zimbabwe

== See also ==
- Nanga Parbat (disambiguation)
  - Nanga Parbat (lit. 'Naked Mountain'), a mountain in Azad Kashmir, Pakistan; ninth highest in the world
- Nangka
