= João I of Kongo =

5th ManiKongo of Kongo from 1470 to 1509

- Awenekongo of the Lukeni Nkanda
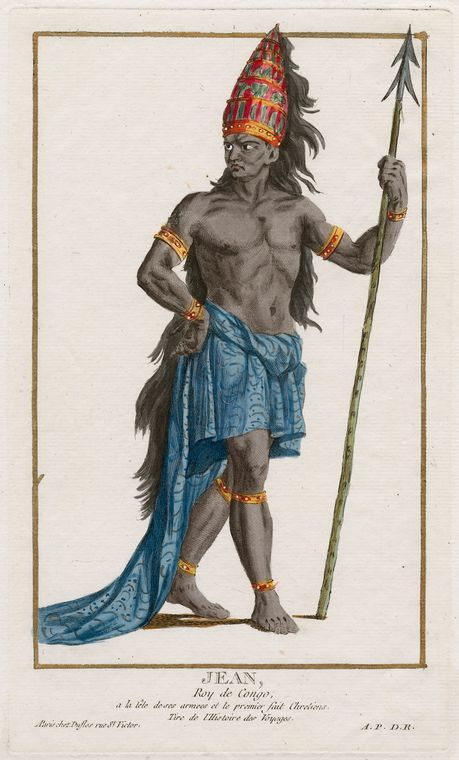

Manikongo of the Kingdom of Kongo
- Reign: 1470–1509
- Predecessor: Nkuwu a Ntinu of Kongo
- Successor: Nzinga-a-Mvemba Afonso I
- Born: Nzinga-a-Nkuwu c. 1440
- Died: 1509 (aged 68–69)
- Spouse: Nzinga a Nlaza
- Issue: Nzinga-a-Mvemba Afonso I
- House: Kilukeni
- Father: Nkuwu a Ntinu of Kongo dia Ntotila
- Religion: Bukongo (Until 1491); Catholicism (1491–1495); Bukongo (1495–1509)

King João I (born Nzinga-a-Nkuwu; c. 1440 – 1509) was the 5th ManiKongo of the Kingdom of Kongo (Kongo: Kongo-dia-Ntotila) between 1470 and 1509. After Portuguese sailors visited his kingdom, he voluntarily briefly converted to Catholicism. He was baptised on 3 May 1491 and took the Portuguese Christian name of João. Soon after, ManiKongo Nzinga-a-Nkuwu João I abandoned the new faith in 1495 for a number of reasons, one of them being the Catholic Church's requirement of monogamy. Politically, he could not afford to abandon polygamy and embrace monogamy, a cultural shift that the king could not contemplate as power in Kongo was elective, rather than hereditary as in Europe; as Kongo culture followed a matrilineality structure, where the elder son of the king is not automatically the next king.

== Early reign ==
King Nzinga-a-Nkuwu was the fifth ruler of Kongo. He was married to Queen Nzinga a Nlaza, a first cousin. She had a son by the king named Nzinga Mbemba. She would later help him become king of Kongo after her husband's death. Under the reign of Nzinga a Nkuwu, Kongo had grown to 100,000 square kilometers and contained a very centralized government.

== Arrival of the Portuguese ==
In 1483, a Portuguese caravel captained by Diogo Cão reached the estuary of the Congo River and made contact with subjects of the king of Kongo. The Portuguese were initially well-received in Kongo. They offered the king of Kongo many presents, and participated in a festival before returning to Lisbon. Cão sailed back to Portugal carrying a party of Kongo emissaries. On arrival in Lisbon, the emissaries were baptised and placed in a monastery before returning to the king in 1491.

On board the ship were also Portuguese priests, masons, carpenters and soldiers, as well as European goods. The ships anchored at Mpinda. After a brief halt to baptise the governor of Soyo, uncle to the manikongo, the procession went on to the capital where they were greeted by the king and five of his leading nobles.

=== Baptisms and later relations ===
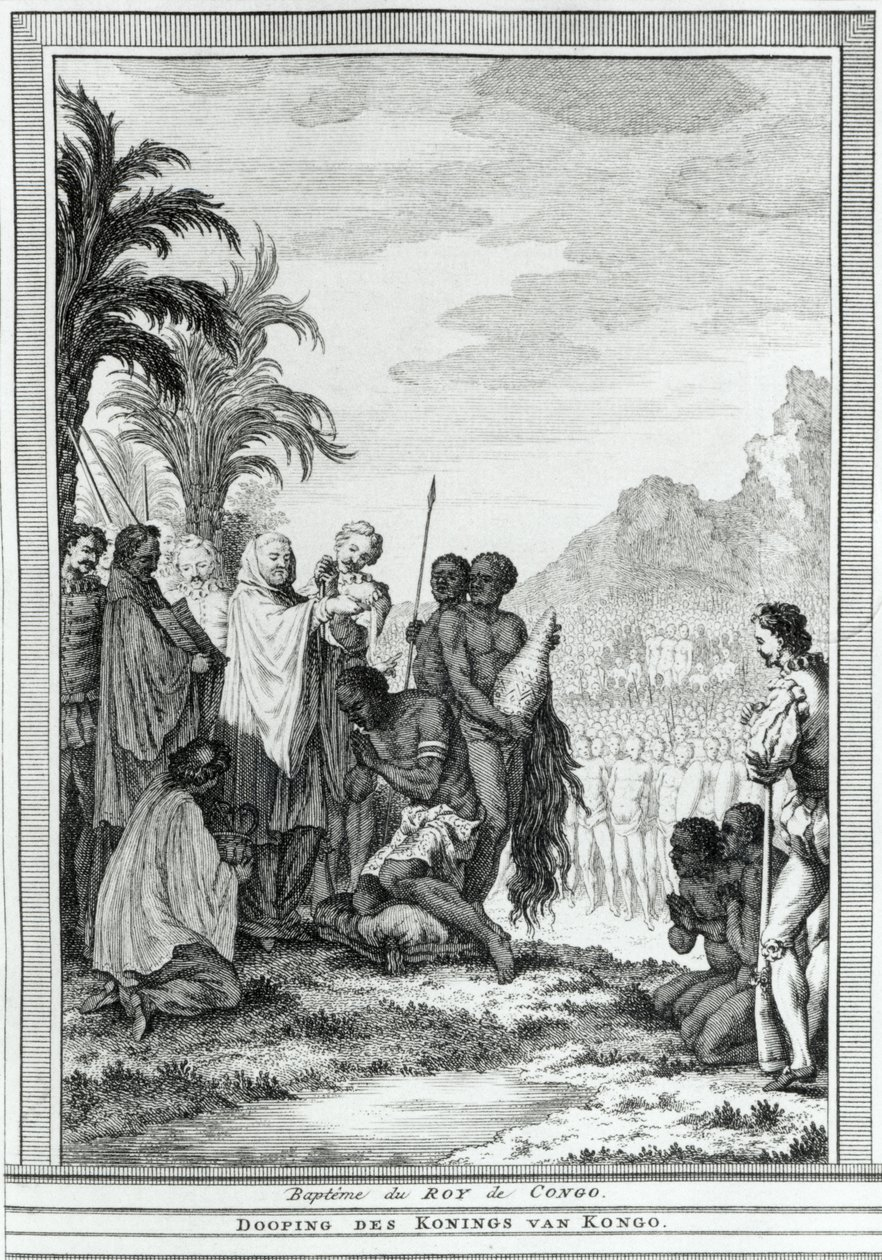
18th-century engraving of the baptism of Nzinga a Nkuwu.

On 3 May 1491, the king of Kongo was baptised along with his family. Initially, only the king and his nobles were to be converted, but the queen demanded to be baptised. Kongo's royal family took the names of their Portuguese counterparts, thus João, Leonor (or Leanor in some instances) and Afonso. A thousand subjects were detailed to help the Portuguese carpenters build a church, meanwhile, the Portuguese soldiers accompanied the king in a campaign to defend the province of Nsundi from Bateke raiders. The European firearms were decisive in the victory and many captives were taken.

== Later life ==
Most of the Portuguese later departed with slaves and ivory while leaving behind priests and craftsmen. After this cultural honeymoon, the king's profession of the Catholic faith proved short-lived. He died in 1509. He was succeeded by his son Afonso I via the Queen Nzinga a Nlaza.

== See also ==
- List of rulers of Kongo
- History of Angola
- Nzinga of Ndongo and Matamba

Preceded by Nkuwu a Ntinu	Manikongo; 1470–1509	Succeeded by Afonso I
