= Nkuwu a Ntinu of Kongo =

Nkuwu a Ntinu
- Mwene Kongo

King of Kongo
- Reign: c. 1450-c. 1470
- Predecessor: Niaza
- Successor: João I
- Born: c. 1422
- Died: c. 1470 (aged at least 47/48)
- Dynasty: Lukeni kanda
- Father: Lukeni lua Nimi

Nkuwu a Ntinu (Portuguese: Encu a Motino; c. 1422 – c. 1470) was the fourth mwenekongo from the Lukeni kanda dynasty to rule the Kingdom of Kongo and reigned during the mid 15th century between c. 1450 and c. 1470.

== Background ==
Manikongo Nkuwu a Ntinu was the son of the Kongo's founder, Lukeni lua Nimi. Little is known about him or his reign other than he did not rule until after both his cousins had been king. This was required of the kingdom's founder to keep the young state together. King Nkuwu a Ntinu was the father of Nzinga a Nkuwu, the king ruling Kongo when the Portuguese arrived in 1483. King Nkuwu a Ntinu was the last of the pre-Christian kings of Kongo.

== See also ==
- List of rulers of Kongo
- Kingdom of Kongo

Preceded by Nlaza	Manikongo; 1450s-1470	Succeeded by João I
