= Garcia V =

Garcia V may refer to:

- García Sánchez III of Pamplona
- Garcia V of Kongo
