= Leonor Nzinga Nlaza =

African noblewoman and advocate of Christianity

Leonor Nzinga Nlaza (floruit 1491), was a queen consort of King Nzinga a Nkuwu of the Kingdom of Kongo.

== Life ==
The specific ancestry of Leonor Nzinga Nlaza is unknown; she was married to King Nzinga a Nkuwu of the Kingdom of Kongo sometime before 1483. Following contact with the Portuguese beginning in 1482 and including an exchange of embassy, her husband decided to become a Christian in 1491 and was baptized as João. However, he was reluctant to allow women to be baptized. Nzinga a Nlaza however, persisted in demanding that women be baptized, and eventually won the king over, allowing her to be baptized along with other noble women. She was baptized on 5 June 1491 taking the name Leonor from the name of the Queen of Portugal at the time.

She showed a strong interest in Christianity, asking the priests who had come from Portugal many questions about the faith and Portugal, eventually being curious enough that she made "her memory art" by using stones and arranging them to help her understand and recall relationships about Christianity. Subsequently, she supplied the priests with substantial quantities of food from her own personal estate.

Among her children, her son Mvemba a Nzinga, who was baptized as Afonso, was the eldest and selected by João to be the Mwene Nsundi, a position usually given to the heir-apparent. When her husband died, however, there were multiple candidates to the throne, and she wished that her son be elected rather than his principal opponent, Mpanzu a Kitemu, João's son by another woman. Although Afonso subsequently presented this struggle for control as a battle between a Christian and a non-Christian, religion probably was less important than the jockeying that normally troubled elections in the Kingdom of Kongo. In order to secure Afonso's succession, Leonor secretly supplied him with information about the state of affairs, and assisted him in secretly returning to the court and facing his half brother down.

She was subsequently known as a staunch supporter of the church, although little more is known of her life subsequent to Afonso's succession to the throne. The date of her death is unknown, but she was buried along with her husband in the Church of Sao Miguel in Mbanza Kongo, a church subsequently known as "Mbiro" (mbila in Kikongo) or grave.

== Subsequent mythology ==
Around 1680, a story about Leonor Nzinga Nlaza surfaced, claiming that she had been a dedicated defender of the traditional religion and not Christian. Afonso, the story went, begged her to remove an idol which she wore around her neck, and finding her stubbornly refusing to take it off, eventually had her buried alive. This story was subsequently recorded retold many times over the following centuries, with various variations and elaborations. The story is still told at Mbanza Kongo today, typically near a star near the city's old airport, installed sometime before 2000. In the current version, she is called "Dona Mpolo" and the star is part of the UNESCO designation of Mbanza Kongo as a World Heritage Site.
