= José I of Kongo =

José I Mpasi a Nkanga, or Zuzi, was ruler of the Kingdom of Kongo between 1779 and 1785.

He was the first ruler from the branch of the House of Kinlaza that came from the southeast of the country, known as the Nkondo ranch, and the first to be included in the kinglists produced by Jean Cuvelier. When José ascended to the throne, the Mbamba Lovata branch of the Kimpanzu house under Pedro V once again contested the throne, which led to a conflict between the two houses once again. This culminated in a decisive battle outside of the capital, São Salvador which was a victory for José, and confirmed his rule. In the aftermath, many Kongolese supporters of Pedro V (usurper) were taken as war captives and sold as slaves in the New World, likely to the French West Indies. After his death, he was succeeded by his brother Afonso V.

Preceded by Álvaro XI	Manikongo; 1779–1785	Succeeded by Afonso V
