= Quinanga of Kongo =

Quinanga
- Mwene Kongo

King of Kongo
- Reign: c. 1420-c. 1435
- Predecessor: Lukeni lua Nimi
- Successor: Nlaza
- Born: c. 1381
- Died: c. 1435 (aged at least 53/54)
- Dynasty: Lukeni kanda

Quinanga of Kongo (c. 1381-c. 1435) was the second ruler or manikongo of the Central African kingdom of Kongo, from the Lukeni kanda dynasty. He was born around 1381 and the dates and events of his reign are not exact, but he ruled from around 1420 to around 1435, when he died. It is known that he was a cousin of the kingdom's founder, Lukeni lua Nimi.

== See also ==
- List of rulers of Kongo
- Kingdom of Kongo

Preceded by Lukeni lua Nimi	Manikongo c. 1420-c. 1435	Succeeded by Nlaza
