= Nanga Parbat (disambiguation) =

Nanga Parbat is a mountain of the Himalayas, and the ninth-highest in the world.

Nanga Parbat may also refer to:

- Nanga Parbat (film), a 2010 film
- Nanga Parbat Mountain (Canada), a mountain on the border of Alberta and British Columbia

== See also ==
- Nanga (disambiguation)
- Diamer (disambiguation), another name of the mountain
- 2013 Nanga Parbat massacre, a mass murder
- Nanda Parbat, a fictional Tibetan city in the DC Comics universe
