= Pedro V of Kongo (usurper) =

Manikongo of Kongo

Pedro V Ntivila a Nkanga was a ruler of the throne of the Kingdom of Kongo and a member of the Kimpanzu house. He ruled Kongo from 1763 to 1764.

He came to the throne by overthrowing Sebastião I, when Pedro refused to relinquish the Kimpanzu claims to the throne. This overthrow resulted in the breakdown of the rotational dynastic succession, put in place by Pedro IV.

His reign was short-lived, however, and after he was in turn overthrown by Álvaro XI, he was removed from the official records, evidenced by the ascension of the official Pedro V in 1859. It is most likely because he claimed the throne at the same time as Álvaro IX, though he kept his claim on the throne even after his removal.

He would once again attempt to usurp the throne after the ascension of Kinlaza member, José I, in 1779. This resulted in another succession dispute between the Kimpanzu, led by Pedro V (usurper), and the Kinlaza, led by King Jose I. A battle occurred between the two factions outside the capital, resulting in Pedro's defeat by Jose's forces. In the aftermath, many of Pedro's Kongolese partisans were taken captive and sold as slaves in the Americas, particularly the French West Indies.

Preceded by Sebastião I	Manikongo; 1763–1764	Succeeded by Álvaro XI of Kongo
