= André II of Kongo =

Ruler of the Kingdom of Kongo (1798–1842)

André II Mvizi a Luken (c. 1798–1842) was the king of Kongo from 1830-1842. André was the first child of the Manikongo Garcia V Nkanga Mvemba. He was eventually overthrown by Henrique III, though he survived but never regained the throne.

Preceded by Garcia V	Manikongo; 1830–1842	Succeeded by Henrique III
