= Henrique III of Kongo =

Ruler of Kongo from 1840 to 1857

Henrique III Mpanzu a Nsindi a Nimi a Lukeni (1798 - 1857) was ruler of the Kingdom of Kongo from the Kivuzi branch of the Kinlaza house, who reigned from 1842 until 1857.

Henrique came to power when he overthrew his predecessor, André II. This was with the support of the elector Ntinu Nsaku. Henrique did not manage to kill Andre II and King Andre continued to exercise power from Mbanza Maputu over some of the Kongo realm.

Shortly after Henrique came to power a group of people who had formerly been enslaved to work for the Capuchin monastery started a rebellion against Henrique. This faction tried to place Henrique's nephew Alvaro Mabambo on the throne. They failed and Alvaro fled to his personal domains. Due to the rebels having ecclesiastical links, Henrique requested aid, from the Portuguese colonial government of Angola, in pursuing and suppressing Alvaro and his supporters, but it was denied.

Henrique appointed his older brother as governor of Mbamba province. He gave his younger brother control of Wembo Province. He gave other supporters control of other provinces in the Kingdom. These provincial rulers built up their own local support networks and largely ran their government on their own, but did allow judicial appeals from their subjects to King Henrique III.

With a strong demand for new slaves in Brazil and Cuba, it continued under his watch, despite the British and Portuguese effort to discourage the trade.

1848 saw another civil war between the Água Rosada faction, led by Andre II, and the Kivuzi branch of the Kinlaza, led by Henrique III. This resulted in the continued export of Kongo people into the Atlantic slave trade, in open opposition to the Slave Trade Act 1807.

Upon his death in 1857, the Kivuzu faction fractured.

| Preceded by André II | Manikongo; 1842-1857 | Succeeded by Álvaro XIII |
