= Henrique I of Kongo =

Henrique I
- Mwene Kongo
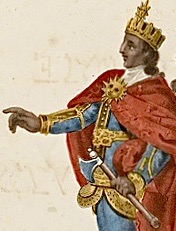
- Henrique I
- Reign: 1567 to 1568
- Predecessor: Bernardo I
- Successor: Álvaro I
- Dynasty: Lukeni kanda

Henrique I Nerika a Mpudi was the ruler of the Kingdom of Kongo from 1567 to 1568 and the last monarch from the Lukeni kanda dynasty. Like his predecessor, Bernardo I, Henrique died while on a campaign at the frontiers of the kingdom. He was killed while fighting the BaTeke of the Anziku Kingdom.

== See also ==
- List of rulers of Kongo
- Kingdom of Kongo
- Anziku Kingdom

Preceded by Bernardo I	Manikongo; 1567–1568	Succeeded by Álvaro I
