= Lufu River =

Lufu River Rivière Lufu Rio Lufu
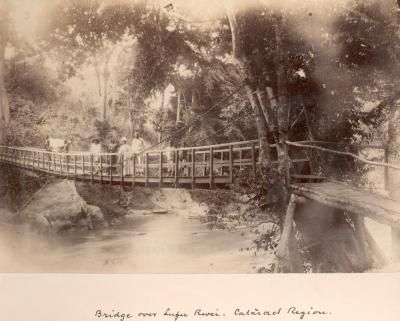
- Bridge over the Lufu River c. 1885

- Location within Democratic Republic of the Congo

Location
- Countries: Angola; Democratic Republic of the Congo

Physical characteristics
- Mouth
  - location: Congo River
  - coordinates: 5.534619°S 13.663274°E
- Basin size: Congo Basin

Basin features
- Tributaries
  - right: Lungezi River

The Lufu River or Luvo River (French: Rivière Luvo; Portuguese: Rio Luvo) is a river of Angola and the Democratic Republic of the Congo. It is a left tributary of the Congo River.

== Location ==
Part of the upper section of the Lufu River, and its tributary the Lungezi River, defines the border between the DRC and Angola to the south. From the border it flows NNW to the town of Lufu, then NW to the Congo River, which it enters from the east at the Inga Falls.

The border section is crossed by illegal immigrants from the Democratic Republic of the Congo to Angola. On market days thousands of people cross the border at the Lufu entry post.

== Sources ==
- Avelino Chico, S. J. (2020), Angola and the Democratic Republic of Congo's border From a place of business to the point of entry for illegal immigration (PDF), Comillas Pontifical University
- Nzeusseu, Viviane (20 May 2016), Emergency Plan of Action: Democratic Republic of Congo: Yellow Fever (PDF), International Federation of Red Cross and Red Crescent Societies
- "Way: Lufu (401961222)", OpenStreetMap
