= Afonso II of Kongo =

Afonso II
- Mwene Kongo

King of Kongo
- Reign: 1561 to 1561
- Predecessor: Diogo I
- Successor: Bernardo I
- Dynasty: Lukeni kanda

Afonso II was a ruler of the Kingdom of Kongo in 1561.

== Biography ==
Little is known about Afonso II or his reign. Duarte Lopes told Filippo Pigafetta the Italian humanist who composed a description of Kongo in 1591 that Diogo I's succession was disputed by three pretenders, His son, who few favored was immediately killed, and a second person was elected favored by the majority of the people, but the Portuguese in the capital murdered him, while the party of the second king murdered the Portuguese favorite and then set out a general massacre of Portuguese. However, contemporary records support a different course of events, the first elected king, Afonso II, ruled only a few days, though he had Portuguese support and was overthrown as being illegitimate by Bernardo.

No contemporary sources mention Afonso II by name, perhaps because his reign was so short, but his name appeared on a list of kings written by Antonio da Silva, a Kongo historian who served as Duke of Mbamba in 1617.

== See also ==
- Kingdom of Kongo
- List of Manikongos of Kongo

Preceded by Diogo I	Manikongo; 1561	Succeeded by Bernardo I
