= Diamer =

Diamer may refer to:

- Nanga Parbat, 9th-highest mountain in the world in Gilgit Baltistan, Pakistan; locally known as Diamer
- Diamer District, district Gilgit Baltistan, Pakistan around the mountain
- Diamer Division, division of Gilgit Baltistan containing the district
- Diamer, Mauritania

== See also ==
- Nanga Parbat (disambiguation)
- Diamer-Bhasha Dam, Diamer District
