= 1496 =

1496 in various calendars
- Gregorian calendar: 1496; MCDXCVI
- Ab urbe condita: 2249
- Armenian calendar: 945; ԹՎ ՋԽԵ
- Assyrian calendar: 6246
- Balinese saka calendar: 1417–1418
- Bengali calendar: 902–903
- Berber calendar: 2446
- English Regnal year: 11 Hen. 7 – 12 Hen. 7
- Buddhist calendar: 2040
- Burmese calendar: 858
- Byzantine calendar: 7004–7005
- Chinese calendar: 乙卯年 (Wood Rabbit); 4193 or 3986 — to — 丙辰年 (Fire Dragon); 4194 or 3987
- Coptic calendar: 1212–1213
- Discordian calendar: 2662
- Ethiopian calendar: 1488–1489
- Hebrew calendar: 5256–5257
- Hindu calendars
- Vikram Samvat: 1552–1553
- Shaka Samvat: 1417–1418
- Kali Yuga: 4596–4597
- Holocene calendar: 11496
- Igbo calendar: 496–497
- Iranian calendar: 874–875
- Islamic calendar: 901–902
- Japanese calendar: Meiō 5 (明応５年)
- Javanese calendar: 1413–1414
- Julian calendar: 1496; MCDXCVI
- Korean calendar: 3829
- Minguo calendar: 416 before ROC 民前416年
- Nanakshahi calendar: 28
- Thai solar calendar: 2038–2039
- Tibetan calendar: ཤིང་མོ་ཡོས་ལོ་ (female Wood-Hare); 1622 or 1241 or 469 — to — མེ་ཕོ་འབྲུག་ལོ་ (male Fire-Dragon); 1623 or 1242 or 470

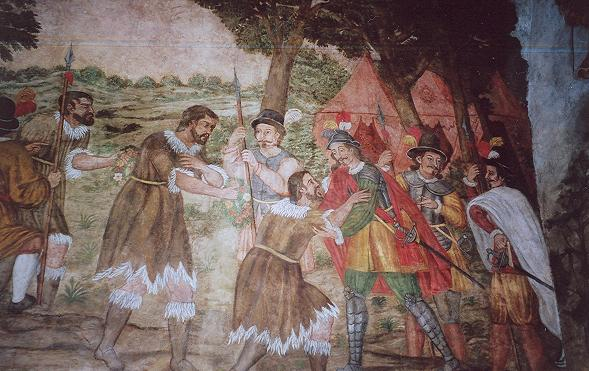
July 5: The Spanish Conquistador Alonso Fernández de Lugo conquers the Canary Islands as the last native kings of Tenerife surrender.

Year 1496 (MCDXCVI) was a leap year starting on Friday of the Julian calendar.

== Events ==
=== January–March ===
- January 1 – In Venice, historian Marino Sanuto begins the first volume of I Diarii, a diary of the events in his own life and, more importantly, a daily record of events in the Republic of Venice and those reported to him by Venetian representatives in other parts of Europe. What is now described as "probably the largest, most comprehensive, and valuable ever written by one man",he continues his daily work for more than 37 years, ending in June 30, 1533.
- February 24 – King Henry VII of England signs the commercial treaty Intercursus Magnus with Venice, Florence, and the cities of the Hanseatic League and the Netherlands.
- February – Pietro Bembo's Petri Bembi de Aetna Angelum Chalabrilem liber, a description of a journey to Mount Etna, is published in Venice by Aldus Manutius, the first book printed in the old-style serif or humanist typeface cut by Francesco Griffo (known from the 20th century as Bembo) and with early adoption of the semicolon (dated 1495 according to the more veneto).
- March 5 – Henry VII of England issues letters patent to Italian-born adventurer John Cabot and his sons, authorizing them to discover unknown lands.
- March 10 – Christopher Columbus leaves Hispaniola for Spain, ending his second visit to the Western Hemisphere. During his time here he has forcibly subjugated the island, enslaved the Taíno, and laid the basis for a system of land grants tied to the Taíno's enslavement.

=== April–June ===
- April 16 – Filippo II becomes the new ruler of the Duchy of Savoy upon the death of his 6-year-old great-nephew, Duke Carlo II Giovanni Amedeo.
- April 23 – In the Marquisate of Mantua on the Italian peninsula, Francesco II Gonzaga, Marquis of Mantua decrees that all Jews in Mantua are to wear a yellow badge to distinguish themselves from the Christian residents of Mantua. He modifies the ruling three days later to declare that a Jewish woman may wear a yellow veil over her face in place of the badge.
- April 26 – King Jan I Olbracht of Poland issues the Piotrków Privilege as a reward to members of nobility who financially supported his invasion of Moldavia. The Privilege prohibits the enslaved serfs from leaving their owners' land without permission, and bans city dwellers from buying land.
- May 2 – The Marquis of Mantua makes a further adjustment to his April 23 decree on Jewish identification, making further allowances to the dress code of Jewish women, and excusing the requirement of wearing a veil to cover the face. Unmarried women must still wear yellow headgear and drape a veil over their shoulders; married women are excused from covering their faces with veils but must wear headgear; and widows may wear their color of choice for headgear.
- May 14 – At Augsburg, Maximilian, King of the Romans, grants an audience to Sir Christopher Urswick, the Kingdom of England's ambassador to the Empire, and informs his advisers that he believes the Ambassador is a spy gathering intelligence on the Empire's intentions toward England. Zacharia Contarini, the Empire's ambassador to France, then sends the report to the Doge of the Republic of Venice, Agostino Barbarigo.
- June 12 – Jesus College, Cambridge, is founded.

=== July–September ===
- July 5 – In the Canary Islands, the native kings of Tenerife surrender to the Spanish conquistador Alonso Fernández de Lugo.
- July 21 – Spanish forces under Gonzalo Fernández de Córdoba capture Atella after a siege. Among the prisoners is the French viceroy of Naples, the Comte de Montpensier. King Ferdinand II of Naples is restored to his throne.
- August 5 – Bartholomew Columbus, brother of Christopher Columbus, formally founds the city of Santo Domingo (first settled in March) on Hispaniola (in the modern-day Dominican Republic), making it the oldest permanent European settlement in the New World.
- September 7– Federico of Aragon becomes the King of Naples upon the death of his nephew, King Ferdinando II.
- September 21– King James IV of Scotland and his army invade Northumberland in the Kingdom of England, in support of the pretender to the English throne, Perkin Warbeck. The invaders leave on September 25 and travel back to Scotland.

=== October–December ===
- October 20 – Joanna of Castile, second daughter of Ferdinand II of Aragon and Isabella I of Castile, heiress to Castile, marries the archduke Philip, heir through his mother to the Burgundian Netherlands, and through his father to the Holy Roman Empire.
- November 20 – King Henry VII of England summons the English Parliament to assemble starting on January 16.
- November 27 – Led by Prince Prataparudra Deva, son of the Emperor Purushottama Deva, the Gajapati Empire (now India's state of Odisha) invades the Vijayanagara Empire (now the Karnataka state) and its armies advance as far as the Penna River, where they are stopped by a force commanded by the Vijayanagara sultan Tuluva Narasa Nayaka, and are turned back.
- December 5 – King Manuel I of Portugal issues a decree ordering the expulsion of "heretics" from the country.

== Births ==
- March 18 – Mary Tudor, Queen of Louis XII of France, daughter of Henry VII of England (d. 1533)
- May 12 – King Gustav Vasa of Sweden (d. 1560)
- July 10 – Johann Forster, German theologian (d. 1558)
- August 28 – Konrad Heresbach, German Calvinist (d. 1576)
- September 27 – Hieronymus Łaski, Polish diplomat (d. 1542)
- October 20 – Claude, Duke of Guise, French aristocrat and general (d. 1550)
- November 23 – Clément Marot, French poet of the Renaissance period (d. 1544)
- December 20 – Joseph ha-Kohen, Spanish-born French Jewish historian and physician (d. 1575)
- December 21 – Elisabeth Corvinus, Hungarian princess (d. 1508)
- date unknown
  - Lazare de Baïf, French diplomat and author (d. 1547)
  - João de Barros, Portuguese historian (d. 1570)
  - Cuauhtémoc, 11th Tlatoani (emperor) of Tenochtitlan (modern Mexico City), 1520–1521, (d. 1521)
  - Dirck Jacobsz., Dutch painter (d. 1567)
  - Richard Maitland, Scottish poet (d. 1586)
  - Louise de Montmorency, French noblewoman (d. 1547)
  - Martín Ocelotl, Mexican priest (d. c. 1537)
  - William Roper, son-in-law and biographer of Thomas More (d. 1578)
  - Giovanni Battista da Sangallo, Italian architect (d. 1548)
  - Menno Simons, Dutch Anabaptist leader (d. 1561)
  - Agostino Steuco, Italian humanist scholar (d. 1548)
  - Johann Walter, Lutheran composer and poet (d. 1570)
- probable
  - María Pacheco, Spanish heroine and defender of Toledo (d. 1531)
  - Richard Rich, 1st Baron Rich, Lord Chancellor of England (d. 1567)
  - Henry Somerset, 2nd Earl of Worcester, English noble (d. 1549)

== Deaths ==
- January 1 – Charles, Count of Angoulême (b. 1459)
- February 24 – Eberhard I, Duke of Württemberg (b. 1445)
- March 4 – Sigismund, Archduke of Austria (b. 1427)
- March 12 – Johann Heynlin, German humanist scholar (b. c. 1425)
- April 16 – Duke Charles II of Savoy (b. 1489)
- April 29 – Fernando de Almada, 2nd Count of Avranches (b. c. 1430)
- August 15 – Infanta Isabella of Portugal, Queen of Castile and León (b. 1428)
- August 28 – Kanutus Johannis, Swedish Franciscan friar, writer and book collector
- September 7 – King Ferdinand II of Naples (b. 1469)
- September 15 – Hugh Clopton, Lord Mayor of London (b. c. 1440)
- September 25 – Piero Capponi, Italian soldier and statesman (b. 1447)
- September 28 – Boček IV of Poděbrady, Bohemian nobleman, eldest son of King George of Podebrady (b. 1442)
- October 15 – Gilbert, Count of Montpensier (b. 1443)
- November 1 – Filippo Buonaccorsi (Filip Callimachus), Italian humanist writer (b. 1437)
- date unknown
  - Richard Bell, Bishop of Carlisle
  - Alexander Inglis, Scottish clergyman
  - Pietro di Francesco degli Orioli, Italian sculptor (b. c. 1458)
  - Piero del Pollaiuolo, Italian painter (b. 1443)
  - Qaitbay, sultan of Egypt
  - Ercole de' Roberti, Italian artist (b. c. 1451)
- probable – Jan IV of Oświęcim, duke of Oświęcim
