= Álvaro XI of Kongo =

Álvaro XI (died 1779) was ruler of the Kingdom of Kongo (1764–1779) from the Kinlaza house.

He overthrew the rule of first Pedro V, who had opposed the rotatioal succession imposed by Pedro IV. As Pedro V continued his claim to the throne after being overthrown, Álvaro's death set off another showdown between the Nkondo branch of the Kinlaza, who favoured José I, and the Mbamba Lovata faction, the main branch of the Kimpanzu house who still favored Pedro V.

Preceded by Pedro V (Usurper)	Manikongo; 1764–1779	Succeeded by José I of Kongo
