= Bernardo I of Kongo =

Bernardo I
- Mwene Kongo
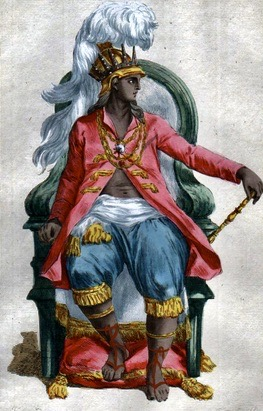
- Bernardo I of Kongo

King of Kongo
- Reign: 1561 to 1567
- Predecessor: Afonso II
- Successor: Henrique I
- Dynasty: Lukeni kanda

Bernardo I of Kongo (died 1567) was a 16th-century manikongo (ruler) of the Kingdom of Kongo, a region encompassing areas in 21st-century Angola and the Democratic Republic of Congo. He came to power after murdering his half-brother Afonso II who was less well-disposed toward the Portuguese.

The rule of Bernardo I extended from 1561 to 1567. Jan Vansina wrote that he was killed while fighting the Tio Kingdom, although Roland Oliver wrote that he was killed fighting the Yaka on Kongo's eastern frontier. The Yaka, who were referred to as Jagas by the Essikongo and the Portuguese, would invade and nearly conquer Kongo in 1568.

== See also ==
- List of Rulers of Kongo
- Kingdom of Kongo

Preceded by Afonso II	Manikongo; 1561–1567	Succeeded by Henrique I
