= Lukeni lua Nimi =

- Mwene Kongo, Founder of the Kingdom of Kongo Dia Ntotlia
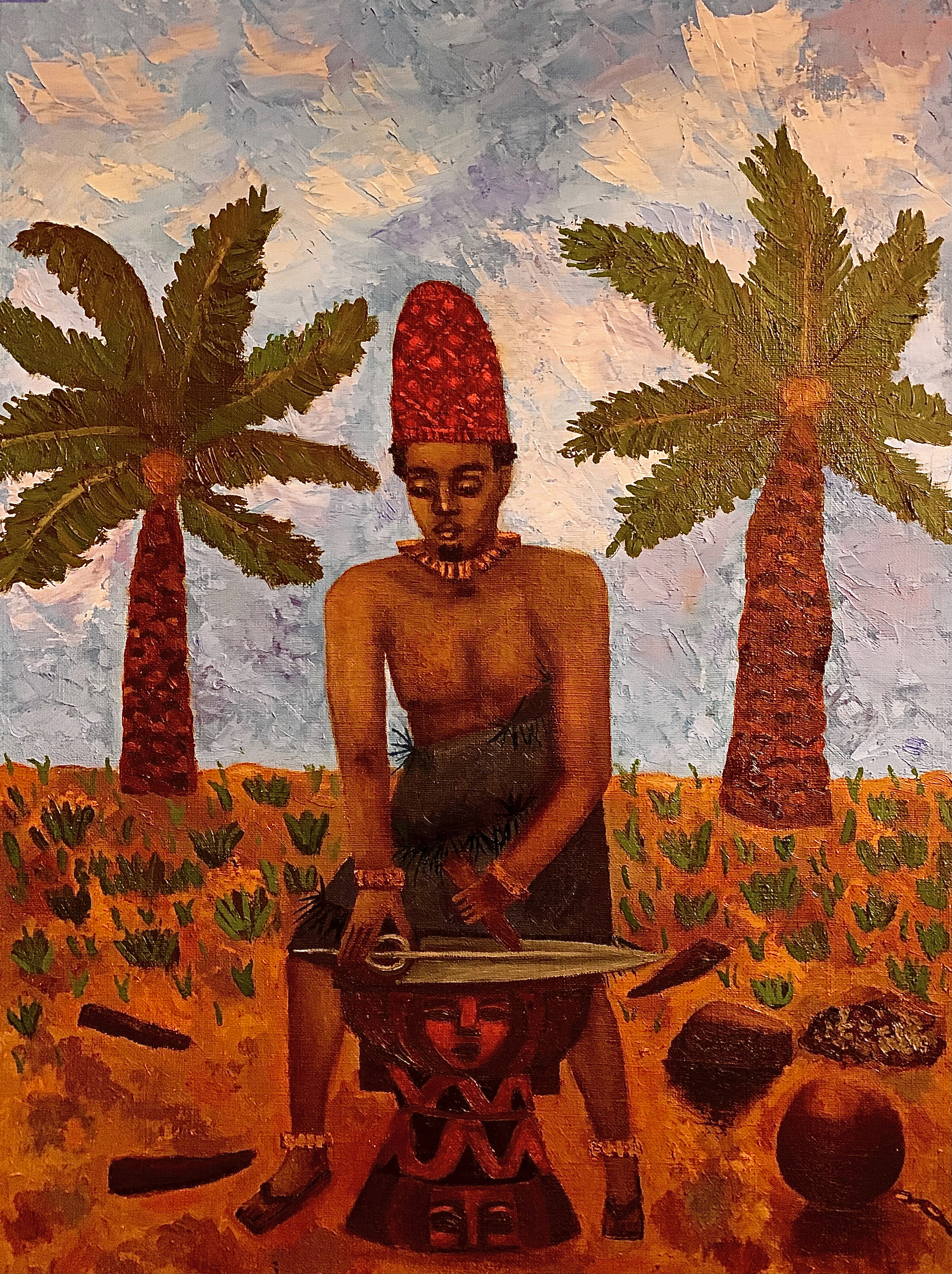
- 2022 artist's rendition

King of Kongo
- Reign: c. 1390–c. 1420
- Successor: Nanga of Kongo
- Born: c. 1380
- Died: c. 1420 (aged around 40)
- Dynasty: Lukeni kanda
- Father: Nimi a Nzima

Lukeni lua Nimi (also Ntinu Nimi a Lukeni; c. 1380–c. 1420) was the traditional founder of the Lukeni kanda dynasty, first king of Kongo and founder of the Kingdom of Kongo Dia Ntotila. The name Nimi a Lukeni appeared in later oral traditions and some modern historians, notably Jean Cuvelier, popularized it. He conquered the kingdom of Mwene.

== Biography ==
He was the son of Nimi a Nzima, ruler of Mpemba Kasi and Luqueni Luansanze, the Mwene Mbata's daughter (a marriage arranged to form an alliance between Nimi's domain and Mbata), according to traditions recorded by Giovanni Cavazzi da Montecuccolo in the mid 17th century. His given name was that of his mother, Lukeni lua Nsanze, meaning that he was at least the fourth-born son. During his father's reign, Lukeni lua Nimi was responsible for collecting tolls from passers-by in his domain while he was absent. This gave rise to a story, where Lukeni lua Nimi was forced to kill a pregnant female relative as she did not want to pay the toll. He was not punished for this by his father, and it was a respected act (either for being bloodthirsty or for impartiality in regards to law).

Although he came from Vungu (or Bungu), located in Mayombe (between the present-day Republic of Congo and the present-day Democratic Republic of Congo), he is traditionally credited with conquering the region of modern-day Mbanza Kongo, displacing a local ruler named Mwene Kabunga or Mwene Mpangala and building his capital there (traditionally draining a lake), taking the title of Ntinu and founding the state of Kongo. He probably ruled in the late 14th century. He is thus regarded as the founder of the Kingdom of Kongo, although some attribute it to his father. Some sources attribute the conquest of the Inkisi valley to Lukeni lua Nimi, ending in the annexation of Nsundi and then Mpangu. The land was then parcelled out to his followers and relatives.

He probably died young, as his son (not an adult at the time of his death), Nkuwu a Ntinu, was not allowed to succeed him, with the title being passed to Lukeni's cousin, Nanga of Kongo. The circumstances of his death and succession allows historians to place his birth date from 1367-1402 and his death date from 1402-1427.

== See also ==
- Kingdom of Kongo
- List of rulers of Kongo
- History of Angola

== Bibliography ==
- Thornton, John K (2020). A history of west central Africa to 1850. Cambridge: Cambridge University Press. ISBN 978-1-107-12715-9.
- Mateso, Bruce (2022). Nimi A Lukeni : Le roi forgeron de Kôngo. La Loupe, N'Tamo (Brazzaville). Paris: Paari éditeur (in French).

Regnal titles
Preceded by Nimi a Nzima	Manikongo; 1390s	Succeeded by Nanga
