= M'banza-Kongo =

Capital of Zaire Province, northwest Angola

Mbanza Kongo
- Municipality and town
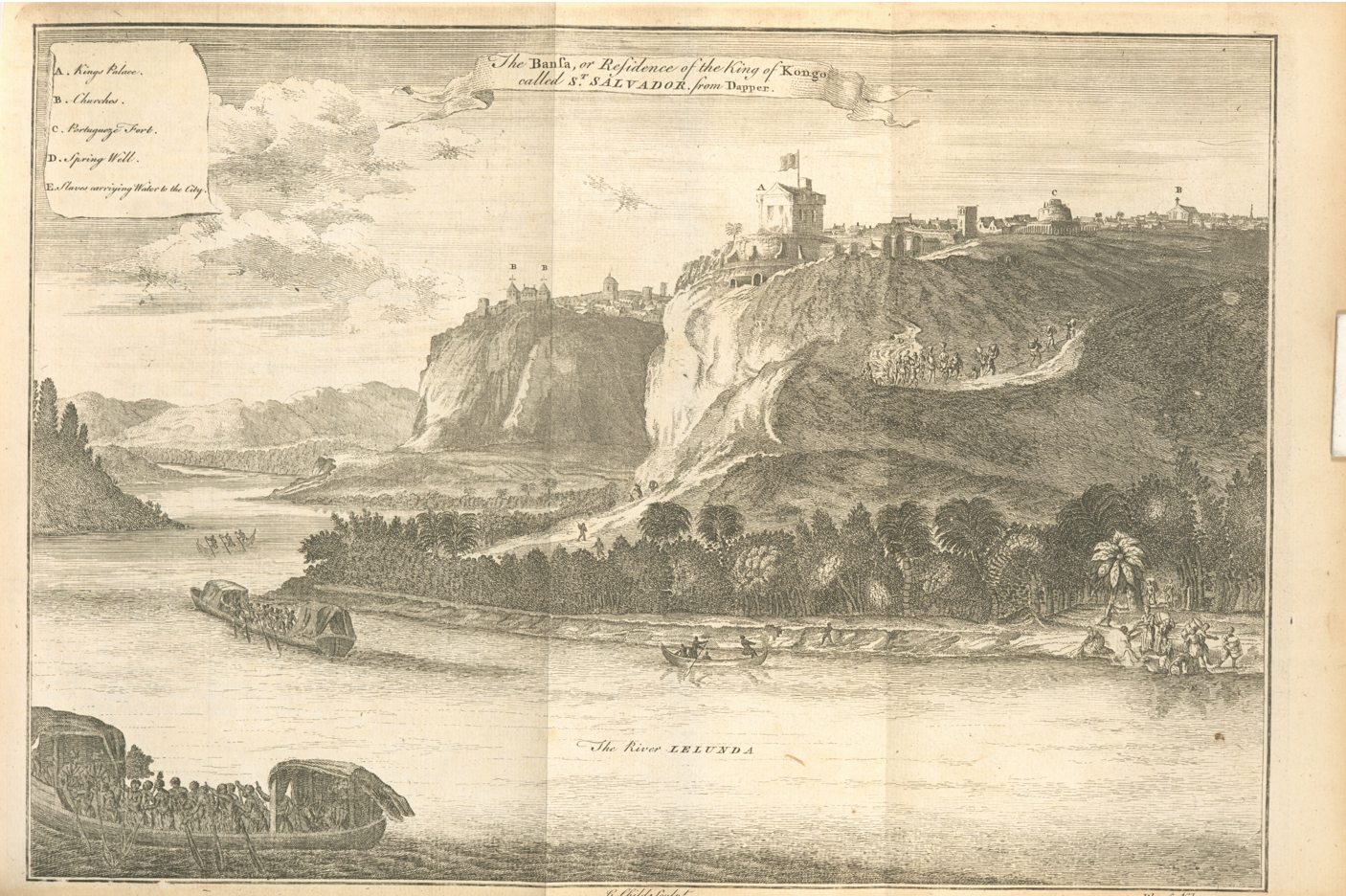
- Mbanza Kongo (São Salvador) in 1745

- Location in Angola
- Coordinates: 6°16′04″S 14°14′53″E
- Country: Angola
- Province: Zaire Province
- Founded: c. 1390
- Founder: Lukeni lua Nimi

Area
  - Total: 5,154 km^{2} (1,990 sq mi)
- Elevation: 408 m (1,339 ft)

Population (2024)
  - Total: 221,141
  - Density: 42.91/km^{2} (111.1/sq mi)
- Time zone: UTC+1 (WAT)
- Climate: Aw

UNESCO World Heritage Site
- Official name: Mbanza Kongo, Vestiges of the Capital of the former Kingdom of Kongo
- Type: Cultural
- Criteria: iii, iv
- Designated: 2017 (41st session)
- Reference no.: 1511
- Region: Africa

Mbanza Kongo (Portuguese pronunciation: [ɐ̃ˈbɐ̃zɐ], [ĩˈbɐ̃zɐ], [mɨˈβɐ̃zɐ] or [miˈβɐ̃zɐ ˈkõɡu], known as São Salvador in Portuguese from 1570 to 1976; Kongo: Mbânza Kôngo) is the capital of Angola's northwestern Zaire Province with a population of 221,141 in 2024. Mbanza Kongo was the capital of the Kingdom of Kongo since its foundation before the arrival of the Portuguese in 1483 until the abolition of the kingdom in 1915, aside from a brief period of abandonment during civil wars in the 17th century. In 2017, Mbanza Kongo was declared a UNESCO World Heritage Site.

== History ==
Mbanza Kongo (formerly called Nkumba a Ngudi, Mongo wa Kaila and Kongo dia Ngunga) was founded by the first manikongo, Lukeni, at a junction of major trade routes. The Kingdom of Kongo at its peak reached from southern Africa's Atlantic coast to the Nkisi River. The Manikongo was chosen by clan leaders to rule some 300 square miles, an area that is part of several countries today. The Portuguese who first reached it in 1491 travelled ten days to get there from the mouth of the Congo River.

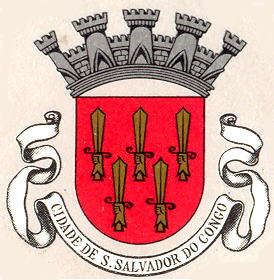
Portuguese coat of arms of São Salvador

The earliest documented kings referred to their city in their correspondence as "the city of Congo" (cidade do Congo), and the name of the city as São Salvador appears for the first time in the letters of Álvaro I of Kongo (1568–1587) and was carried on by his successors.

When the Portuguese arrived in Kongo, Mbanza Kongo was already a large town, perhaps the largest in sub-equatorial Africa, and a letter from the Portuguese ambassador to Lisbon compared the size of the city (inside the inner walls) to the Portuguese town of Évora.

By the 1550s Mbanza Kongo hosted a community of Portuguese traders and Jesuit missionaries who conspired together in an attempted overthrow of the manikongo Diogo I Nkumbi a Mpudi.

In 1568 the manikongo Alvaro I was driven from Mbanza Kongo by the invading Jagas, who sacked the city. Alvaro managed to reclaim the capital with Portuguese military help, but had to yield Luanda, source of the nzimbu currency used in the kingdom, to them in payment.

During the reign of Afonso II, stone buildings were added, including a palace and several churches. Mbanza Kongo grew substantially as the kingdom of Kongo expanded and grew, and an ecclesiastical statement of the 1620s related that 4,500 baptisms were performed in the city and its immediate hinterland (presumably the valleys that surround it), which is consistent with an overall population of around 130,000 people. Of these, perhaps 30,000-45,000 lived in the nuclear city atop the mountain, while the remainder would have been distributed across smaller villages within the approximately 30-kilometre limit of its parish. Among the city's important buildings were some twelve churches, including São Salvador, as well as private chapels and oratories and an impressive two-story royal palace, the only such building in all of Kongo, according to visitor Giovanni Francesco da Roma (1648).

The city was sacked several times during the civil wars that followed the Battle of Mbwila (or Ulanga) in 1665, and was abandoned in 1678. It was reoccupied in 1705 by Dona Beatriz Kimpa Vita's followers and restored as Kongo's capital by King Pedro IV of Kongo in 1709. It was never depopulated again though its population fluctuated substantially during the eighteenth and nineteenth century.

The name was changed back to "City of Kongo" (Mbanza Kongo) shortly after Angolan independence.

== Geography ==
Mbanza Kongo lies close to Angola's border with the Democratic Republic of the Congo. It is located at around 6°16′0″S 14°15′0″E and sits on top of an impressive flat-topped mountain, sometimes called Mongo a Kaila (mountain of division) because recent legends recall that the king created the clans of the kingdom and sent them out from there. In the valley to the south runs the Luezi River.

=== Climate ===
M'banza-Kongo has a tropical savanna climate (Köppen Aw) similar to Kinshasa or Pointe-Noire, characterised by a fairly long though not intense wet season from October to May, and a relatively short but almost rainless dry season from June to September caused by the strong influence of the cold Benguela Current during this period.

Climate data for M'banza-Kongo (1920–1952)
Month	Jan	Feb	Mar	Apr	May	Jun	Jul	Aug	Sep	Oct	Nov	Dec	Year
Record high °C (°F)	33.5 (92.3)	37.0 (98.6)	37.7 (99.9)	35.5 (95.9)	35.0 (95.0)	32.5 (90.5)	35.0 (95.0)	32.5 (90.5)	32.0 (89.6)	35.0 (95.0)	36.0 (96.8)	32.5 (90.5)	37.7 (99.9)
Mean daily maximum °C (°F)	28.1 (82.6)	28.7 (83.7)	29.5 (85.1)	28.9 (84.0)	28.2 (82.8)	26.5 (79.7)	24.6 (76.3)	24.6 (76.3)	26.0 (78.8)	27.4 (81.3)	28.0 (82.4)	27.7 (81.9)	27.4 (81.3)
Daily mean °C (°F)	24.2 (75.6)	24.6 (76.3)	25.0 (77.0)	24.7 (76.5)	24.0 (75.2)	22.0 (71.6)	20.2 (68.4)	20.2 (68.4)	21.6 (70.9)	23.4 (74.1)	24.0 (75.2)	23.9 (75.0)	23.2 (73.8)
Mean daily minimum °C (°F)	20.2 (68.4)	20.5 (68.9)	20.4 (68.7)	20.5 (68.9)	19.8 (67.6)	17.5 (63.5)	15.8 (60.4)	15.8 (60.4)	17.3 (63.1)	19.3 (66.7)	20.0 (68.0)	20.1 (68.2)	18.9 (66.0)
Record low °C (°F)	16.5 (61.7)	17.1 (62.8)	16.7 (62.1)	17.2 (63.0)	14.9 (58.8)	13.0 (55.4)	12.0 (53.6)	12.3 (54.1)	13.3 (55.9)	16.4 (61.5)	17.0 (62.6)	16.5 (61.7)	12.0 (53.6)
Average rainfall mm (inches)	139 (5.5)	133 (5.2)	175 (6.9)	255 (10.0)	156 (6.1)	2 (0.1)	0 (0)	4 (0.2)	8 (0.3)	80 (3.1)	167 (6.6)	183 (7.2)	1,299 (51.1)
Average rainy days (≥ 0.1 mm)	9	7	10	15	10	1	0	1	1	7	13	12	86
Source: Deutscher Wetterdienst

== Sites ==
M'banza Kongo is known for the ruins of its 16th century Cathedral of the Holy Saviour of Congo (built in 1491), which many Angolans claim is the oldest church in sub-Saharan Africa. The present-day church, called São Salvador, known locally as nkulumbimbi, is now said to have been built by angels overnight. It was elevated to the status of cathedral in 1596. Pope John Paul II visited the site during his tour of Angola in 1992.

Another interesting site of historical significance is the memorial to King Afonso I's mother near the airport, which commemorates a popular legend that began in the 1680s that the king had buried his mother alive because she was not willing to give up an "idol" which she wore around her neck.

Other important sites include the Jalankuwo (alternative spelling: Yala Nkuwo), the Manikongo's judgement tree, which can still be found in the downtown area of the city, along with the sunguilu, a rectangular ground level structure where local tradition says the king's body was washed before burial. Both are on the grounds of the royal palace and present day Royal Museum.

The Royal Museum, recently rebuilt as a modern structure, houses an impressive collection of artifacts from the old Kingdom, even though many were lost from the older building during the Civil War of 1976–2002.

== Bibliography ==
- Ndamba, Josué. Kongo Kultur Vol.4. 2021 : Réhabiliter et s'approprier MBanza Kongo. La Loupe, N'Tamo (Brazzaville), Paris: Paari éditeur, 2022. (in French)
