= Garcia V of Kongo =

Ruler of the Kingdom of Kongo from 1803 to 1830

Garcia V (died 1830) was ruler (Manikongo) of the Kingdom of Kongo from 1803 until January 1830.

He returned the Kingdom of Kongo to the rule of the Água Rosada dynasty, founded by Pedro IV, after a number of Kinlaza kings. He was succeeded by his son André II Mvizi a Luken.

Preceded by Henrique II	Manikongo; 1803–1830	Succeeded by André II
