= Lungezi River =

- Location within Democratic Republic of the Congo

Location
- Country: Democratic Republic of the Congo
- Province: Kongo Central

Physical characteristics
- Source
  - coordinates: 5.8353°S 14.3425°E
- Mouth: Lufu River
  - coordinates: 5.848873°S 14.1445°E

The Lungezi River (or Lungezy, Rivière Lungesi, Rivière Lungézi, Rio Lunguezi) is a river that forms part of the border between Angola and the Democratic Republic of the Congo. It is a tributary of the Lufu River.

== Course ==
The Lungezi River rises in Kongo Central province to the east of Songololo, flows southwest to the border with Angola where it is joined by the Lavemba River, then flows west along the border until it joins the Lufu River, which flows north through Angola and continues west along the border. The Köppen climate classification is Aw: tropical savanna, wet.

== Sources ==
- "Lungesi, Angola", Mindat.org
- "Way: Lungezy (401961233)", OpenStreetMap
