= Nangka =

Nangka may refer to:

- Jackfruit (Artocarpus heterophyllus), a species of tree
- Nangka (state constituency), represented in the Sarawak State Legislative Assembly
- Typhoon Nangka, a name used for tropical cyclones in the northwestern Pacific Ocean
