= Battle of Thanesar (1567) =

1567 battle in India

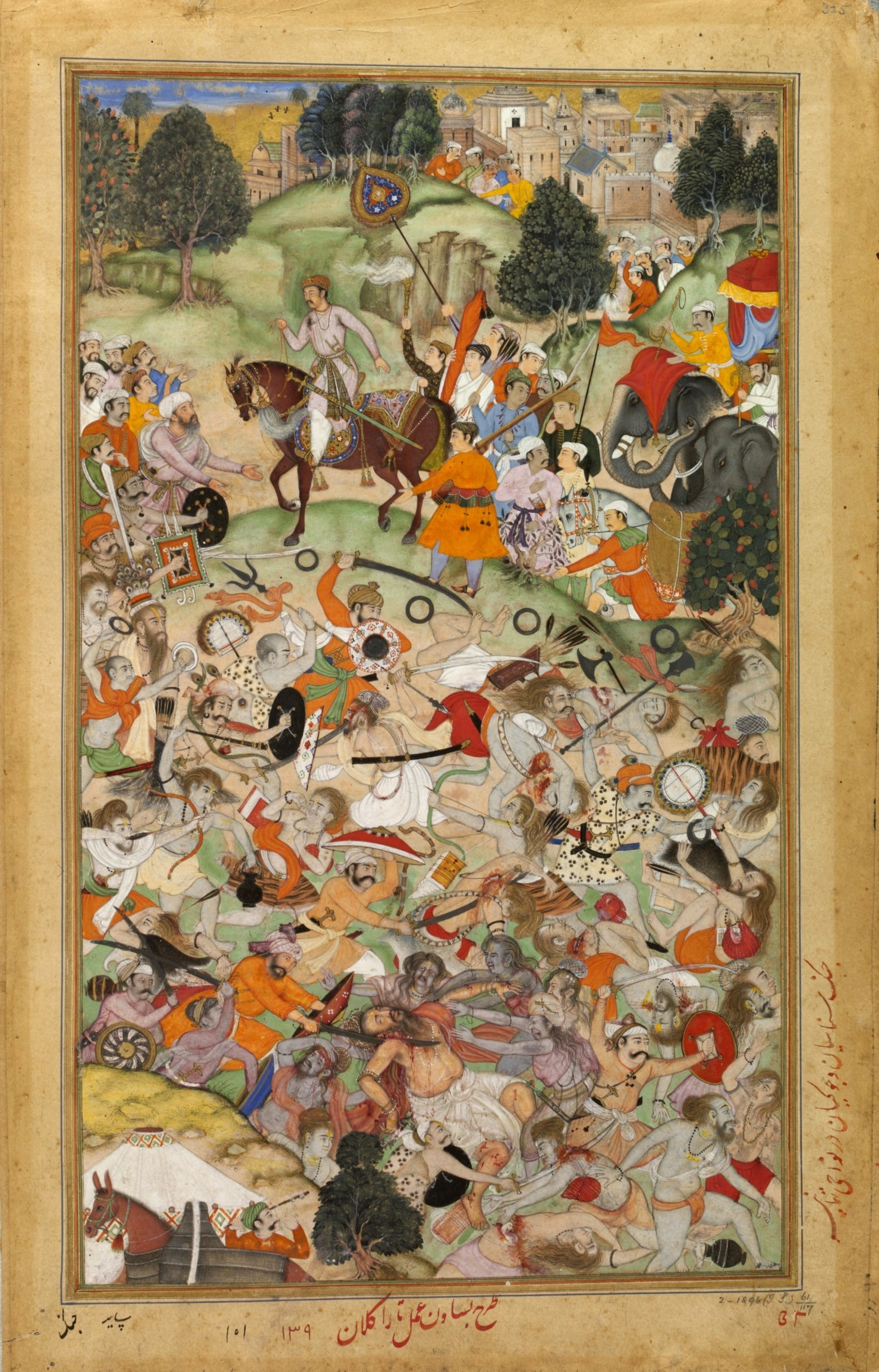
- Akbar viewing the Mughal Army killing Sannyasis, Akbarnama (1590–1596)
Date	9 April 1567
Location	Thanesar, on the banks of the Holy Sarovar near Sarsawati Ghaggar River, the present-day state of Haryana.
Result	Mughal victory

Belligerents
Mughal Empire	Two rival groups of Sanyasis

Commanders and leaders
Akbar; Mehtar Khan; Ghazi Khan Badakshani	Unknown

Strength
300 men 2 cannons 400 matchlocks 75 war elephants	7,000–9,000 Sanyasis

Battle of Thanesar (also known as the Battle of the Ascetics) was fought on the eve of Solar eclipse holy bath fair on 9 April 1567, near Thanesar on the banks of the Saraswati Ghaggar River in the state of Haryana. While the Mughal Emperor Akbar was on his campaign to subdue the rebellious Rajputs of Mewar, he set up camp at a spring and established camp around that freshwater reservoir in order to properly manage his forces in the nearby regions.

== Occupation ==
After staying at a spring for weeks during the scorching summer heat, Akbar and the Mughal army encountered a very large group of Sanyasis, who gathered to take holy dip on the banks of the spring. The ascetics approached and entered the Mughal Camp disregarding the rules of the Mughal Encampment, which was built next to their holy river. Akbar was generally displeased at their arrival because he was gathering his armies, building morale, and preparing for his next campaign against Rana Udai Singh of Mewar. However, the main intention of the Sanyasi group was to drink and bathe in the spring, which they considered sacred.

As the summer afternoon began to scorch another group of sanyasis arrived and they began to gather in their hundreds and thousands around the spring. Outraged by their presence and intrusion, a general advised Akbar to take action. The Mughals were waiting for an opportunity to drive the ascetics out of their encampment, but Akbar believed that they would leave by sunset.

== Battle ==
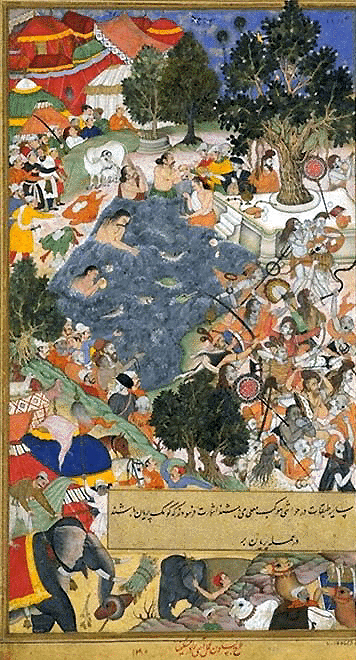
Mughals slay the Sannyasis at Thanesar, Akbarnama

The Mughal Emperor Akbar, continued to concede the spring to the Sanyasis and carefully observed their actions. As the "first" large group of monks bathed and drank from the holy spring, a "second" group of monks also began to arrive in their hundreds. It was due to the arrival of the second group that tensions ignited among the two large groups, which eventually culminated in a brawl inside the spring and almost immediately the two rival groups of Sanyasis began to battle each other using katars.

Concerned that the violence might spread into the Mughal encampment, the Mughal Emperor Akbar ordered almost 250 of his men to immediately retake the Sarovar from the schismatic monks. The Mughals armed with talwars, piked-shields, matchlocks, and composite bows and arrows, ferociously overwhelmed the ranks of monks ultimately driving them away from the spring according to their jurisdiction, which justified the usage of force.

== Aftermath ==
The Mughal Emperor Akbar continued to command his campaign from Thanesar, and within the coming months the Mughals organized the well-documented Siege of Chittorgarh against the forces of the Rana Udai Singh II at Chittor Fort.

Akbar had learned a valuable lesson from this event and passed a Firman banning any commoner from entering any Mughal encampments without a credible reason.

== See also ==
- Mughal weapons
