= Kilukeni =

c. 1390 – 1567 ruling dynasty of the Kingdom of Kongo

House of Kilukeni Lukeni kanda
- Country: Kingdom of Kongo Kingdom of Loango Kingdom of Kakongo Kingdom of Ngoyo Kingdom of Ndongo Kingdom of Vungu
- Founded: c.1390; 636 years ago
- Founder: Lukeni lua Nimi
- Final ruler: Henrique I
- Titles: List: King of Kongo; King of Loango; King of Kakongo; King of Ngoyo; King of Nkongo; King on this side of the Zaire and beyond it; King of Vungu; Duke of Nsundi; Duke of Mbemba; Lord of the Ambundu; Lord of Angola; Lord of Aquisima; Lord of Musuru; Lord of Matamba; Lord of Malilu; Lord of Musuko; Lord of Anzizo; Lord of the conquest of Pangu-Alumbu
- Deposition: Kingdom of Kongo: 1 February 1568
- Cadet branches: House of Kwilu; House of Kinkanga; House of Kimpanzu; House of Kinlaza

The Kilukeni were members of the Lukeni kanda or House of Kilukeni, the ruling dynasty of the Kingdom of Kongo from its inception in the late 14th century until the 1567 with the rise of the House of Kwilu. The Kilukeni were springboard for most of the major factions that battled for control of Kongo during its civil war.

== Etymology ==
In KiKongo the language of the kingdom of Kongo, the name of the kanda is Lukeni. It is taken from the first name of the founder of the kingdom, Lukeni lua Nimi. Lukeni lua Nimi ruled around the 1390s before the throne was handed down to his cousins.

== History ==
Beginning with the reign of Nkuwu a Ntinu, a son of Lukeni and the last non-Catholic mwenekongo, the throne passed from father to son. Occasionally there were usurpations, but the crown stayed within the lineage of the founder until 1567 when a king from the region of Nsi Kwilu, Álvaro I ascended after the last of the Kilukeni died in battle against the Anziku Kingdom.

== See also ==
- Kingdom of Kongo
- Kimpanzu
- Kinkanga
- Kongo Civil War
- List of rulers of Kongo
