= Manikongo =

Title of the rulers of the Kingdom of Kongo

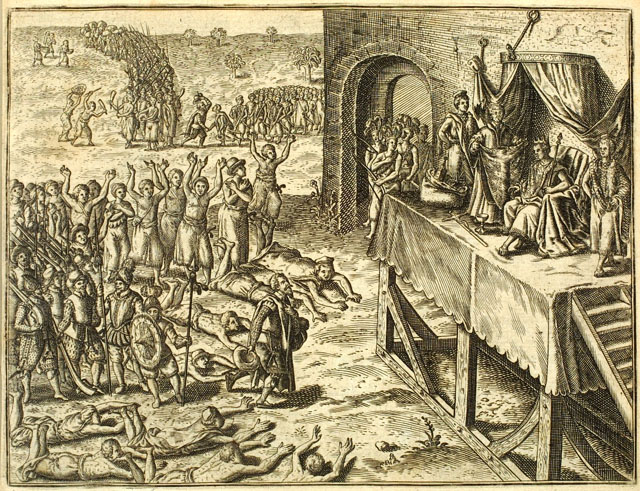
The Manikongo giving audience to his subjects and Portuguese visitors

Manikongo (also called Awenekongo or Mwenekongo) was the title of the ruler of the Kingdom of Kongo, a kingdom that existed from the 14th to the 19th centuries and consisted of land in present-day Angola, Gabon, the Republic of the Congo and the Democratic Republic of the Congo. The manikongo's seat of power was Mbanza Kongo (also called São Salvador from 1570 to 1975), now the capital of Zaire Province in Angola. The manikongo appointed governors for the provinces of the Kingdom and received tribute from neighbouring subjects.

The term "manikongo" is derived from Portuguese manicongo, an alteration of the KiKongo term Mwene Kongo (literally "Lord of Kongo"). The term wene, from which mwene is derived, is also used to mean kingdom and is attested with this meaning in the Kongo catechism of 1624 with reference to the Kingdom of Heaven. The term mwene is created by adding the personal prefix mu- to this stem, to mean "person of the kingdom".

Mwene is attested in very early texts, notably the letters of King Afonso I of Kongo, where he writes, to Portuguese kings Manuel I (in 1514) and João III concerning the moenipango (mwene Mpangu) and twice concerning the moinebata. Mani was used to mean not only "king" but also anyone holding authority, so provincial and sub-provincial officials also were called mani. Afonso did not entitle himself Manikongo, but rather rei de congo (king of Kongo).

Subjects were required to prostrate themselves before the Manikongo, approaching him on all fours, and when time came for the Manikongo to eat or drink, an attendant would chime two iron rods, cueing them to lay face-down so that they could not see him do so.

== See also ==
- List of rulers of Kongo
