= List of state leaders in the 17th century =

This is a list of state leaders in the 17th century (1601–1700) AD, except for the leaders within the Holy Roman Empire, and the leaders within South Asia.

These polities are generally sovereign states, but excludes minor dependent territories, whose leaders can be found listed under territorial governors in the 17th century. For completeness, these lists can include colonies, protectorates, or other dependent territories that have since gained sovereignty.

== Africa ==
=== Africa: Central ===
Angola

- Kasanje Kingdom (complete list) –

- Kalanda ka Imbe, King (c.1600s)
- Kulashingo, King (c.1610–1616)
- Kasanje ka Kulashingo, King (c.1616–1620s)
- Kalunga ka Kilombo, King (c.1630s–1650)
- Ngongo a Mbande, King (c.1650–1680)
- Dom. Pascoal Machado, King (1680)
- Kingwangwa kya Kima, King (c.1680–1681)
- Kitamba kya Keta, King (1681–1690)
- Mwanya a Kasanje, King (c.1690s)
- Kiluanje kya Ngonga, King (c.1690s–1700s)

- Kingdom of Kongo (complete list) –

Kwilu dynasty

- Álvaro II, Manikongo (1587–1614)
- Bernardo II, Manikongo (1614–1615)
- Álvaro III, Manikongo (1615–1622)

Kinkanga dynasty

- Pedro II, Manikongo (1622–1624)
- Garcia I, Manikongo (1624–1626)

Kwilu dynasty

- Ambrósio I, Manikongo (1626–1631)
- Álvaro IV, Manikongo (1631–1636)

Kimpanzu dynasty

- Álvaro V, Manikongo (1636)

Kinlaza dynasty

- Álvaro VI, Manikongo (1636–1641)
- Garcia II, Manikongo (1641–1660)
- António I, Manikongo (1660–1665)

Civil War: Awenekongo

- Afonso II, Manikongo (1665)
- Álvaro VII, Manikongo (1665–1666)
- Álvaro VIII, Manikongo (1666–1669)
- Pedro III, Manikongo (1669)
- Álvaro IX, Manikongo (1669–1670)
- Rafael I, Manikongo (1670–1673)
- Afonso III, Manikongo (1673–1674)
- Daniel I, Manikongo (1674–1678)

- Kongo claimants of Kibangu (complete list) –

- Garcia III of Kibangu, Awenekongo (1669–1685)
- André I of Kibangu, Awenekongo (1685)
- Manuel I of Kibangu, Awenekongo (1685–1688)
- Álvaro X of Kibangu, Awenekongo (1688–1695)
- Pedro IV, Awenekongo (1695–1709)

- Kongo claimants of Lemba (complete list) –

- Pedro III, Awenekongo (1669–1680)
- João II of Lemba, Awenekongo (1680–1716)

- Kongo claimants of Mbamba Lovata (complete list) –

- Manuel of Lovata, Awenekongo (1678–1715)

- Kingdom of Matamba (complete list) –

- Mwongo Matamba, Queen (?–1631)
- Nzinga Mbande, Queen (1631–1663)
- Barbara, Queen (1663–1666)
- Njinga Mona, King (1666–1669)
- João, King (1669–1670)
- Njinga Mona, King (1670–1680)
- Francisco I, King (1680–1681)
- Verónica I, Queen (1681–1721)

- Portuguese Angola, (complete list) –

Colony, 1575–1951
For details see the Kingdom of Portugal under Southwest Europe

Cameroon

- Fondom of Bafut (complete list) –

- Feurlu, King (1516–1552)
- Nebasi Suh, King (1552–1570)
- Ambebi Ferh, King (1570–1635)
- Nebanfor, King (1635–1677)
- Chunga, King (1677–1708)

- Kingdom of Bamum (complete list) –

- Ngapna, Mfon (1590–1629)
- Ngouloure, Mfon (1629–1672)
- Koutou, Mfon (1672–1757)

Chad

- Sultanate of Bagirmi (complete list) –

- ‘Abdallah, Mbangi (1568–1608)
- ‘Umar (1608–1625)
- Dalai, Mbangi (1625–1635)
- Burkomanda I, Mbangi (1635–1665)
- ‘Abdul Rahman I, Mbangi (1665–1674)
- Dalo Birni, Mbangi (1674–1680)
- ‘Abdul Qadir I, Mbangi (1680–1707)

Congo, Democratic Republic of the

- Kuba Kingdom (complete list) –

- Shamba Bolongongo, Nyim (c.1600)
- Bongo Lenge, Nyim (17th century)
- Golo Bosh, Nyim (17th century)
- Boni Bosh, Nyim (17th century)
- Kongo Kama Bomanchala, Nyim (17th century)
- Bo Kama Bomanchala, Nyim (c.1680)
- Golo Boke, Nyim (late 17th century)
- Bokere Boke, Nyim (late 17th century)
- KotomBoke, Nyim (17th or 18th century)

- Kingdom of Lunda (complete list) –

- Cibind Yirung, Mwaantaangaand (c.1600–c.1630)
- Yaav I a Yirung, Mwaantaangaand (c.1630–c.1660)
- Yaav II a Nawej, Mwaantaangaand (c.1660–c.1690)
- Mbala I Yaav, Mwaant Yaav (c.1690–c.1720)

Congo, Republic of the

- Kingdom of Loango (complete list) –

- Moe Poaty I Kamangou, King (16th or 17th century)
- Ngouli N'Kama Loembe, King (17th century)
- N'Gangue M'voumbe Niambi, King (late 17th century)

Gabon

- Kingdom of Orungu (complete list) –

- Reto Ndongo, Founder (c.1700–?)

São Tomé and Príncipe

- Portuguese São Tomé and Príncipe (complete list) –

Colony, 1470–1951
For details see the Kingdom of Portugal under Southwest Europe

=== Africa: East ===
Great Lakes area

Burundi

- Kingdom of Burundi (complete list) –

- Ntare I Rushatsi Cambarantama, King (c.1530–c.1550)
- Mwezi I Baridamunka, King (c.1550–c.1580)
- Mutaga I Mutabazi, King (c.1580–c.1600)
- Mwambutsa I Nkomati, King (c.1600–c.1620)
- Ntare II Kibogora, King (c.1620–c.1650)
- Mwezi II Nyaburunga, King (c.1650–c.1680)
- Ntare I, King (c.1680–c.1709)

Kenya

- Sultanate of Mombasa (complete list) –

- Yusuf ibn al-Hasan (1614–1632)

- Pate Sultanate: Nabahani dynasty (complete list) –

- Bwana Mkuu, Mfalume (1688–1713)

Rwanda

- Kingdom of Rwanda (complete list) –

- Kigeli II Nyamuheshera, King (1576–1609)
- Mibamwe II Sekarongoro II Gisanura, King (1609–1642)
- Yuhi III Mazimpaka, King (1642–1675)
- Cyilima II Rujugira, King (1675–1708)

South Sudan

- Shilluk Kingdom –

- Odaagø Ocøllø, Rädh (c.1600–1635)
- Dhokoth, Rädh (c.1670–1690)
- Tugø, Rädh (c.1690–1710)

Uganda

- Buganda (complete list) –

- Suuna I, Kabaka (c.1584–c.1614)
- Sekamaanya, Kabaka (c.1614–c.1634)
- Kimbugwe, Kabaka (c.1634–c.1644)
- Kateregga, Kabaka (c.1644–c.1674)
- Mutebi I, Kabaka (c.1674–c.1680)
- Juuko, Kabaka (c.1680–c.1690)
- Kayemba, Kabaka (c.1690–c.1704)

- Bunyoro (complete list) –

- Cwamali, Omukama
- Masamba, Omukama
- Anabwani I, Omukama (late 17th century)
- Kyebambe I, Omukama
- Winyi III, Omukama
- Nyaika, Omukama

Horn of Africa area

Ethiopia

- Ethiopian Empire: Solomonic dynasty (complete list) –

- Za Dengel, Emperor (1603–1604)
- Yaqob, Emperor (1597–1603, 1604–1606)
- Susenyos I, Emperor (1606–1632)
- Fasilides, Emperor (1632–1667)
- Yohannes I, Emperor (1667–1682)
- Iyasu I, Emperor (1682–1706)

- Ennarea (complete list) –

- Badancho, Hinnare-tato (c.1580–1603)
- Benero, Hinnare-tato (c.1605–1619)
- Sysgayo, Hinnare-tato (c.1619–1630)
- Emana Krestos, Hinnare-tato (c.1630–1640)
- Gumičo, Hinnare-tato (c.1650–1645)
- Techochi, Hinnare-tato (mid 17th century)
- Gaha Nechocho, Hinnare-tato (mid 17th century)
- Gawa Sherocho, Hinnare-tato (late 17th century)

- Kingdom of Garo (complete list) –

- Ambiraj, Tato (1567–1600)
- Magela, Tato (1600–1630)
- Daro, Tato (1630–1660)
- Chowaka, Tato (1660–1690)
- Leliso, Tato (1690–1720)

- Emirate of Harar (complete list) –

- ʿAli ibn Dā'ūd, Emīr (1647–1662)
- Hāshim ibn ʿAli, Emīr (1662–1671)
- ʿAbdullah ibn ʿAli, Emīr (1671–1700)
- Ṭalḥa ibn ʿAbdullah, Emīr (1700–1721)

- Kingdom of Kaffa (complete list) –

- Bong-he or Borrete or Bongatato, King (1565–1605)
- Giba Nekiok or Bonge or Galo Nechocho, King (1605–1640)
- Gali Gafocho or Gali Ginok, King (1640–1675)
- Gali Ginocho or Tan Ginok, King (1675–1710)

- Kingdom of Welayta: Tigre dynasty (complete list) –

- Gazenja, Kawa (17th century)
- Gazenya
- Addayo, Kawa (17th century)

Somalia

- Sultanate of the Geledi (complete list) –

- Ibrahim Adeer, Sultan (late 17th century–mid 18th century)

- Warsangali Sultanate –

- Garaad Abdale, Sultan (1585–1612)
- Garaad Ali, Sultan (1612–1655)
- Garaad Mohamud IV, Sultan (1655–1675)
- Garaad Naleye, Sultan (1675–1705)

Indian Ocean

Comoros

- Sultanate of Ndzuwani (complete list) –

- Alimah III, Sultan/female ruler (c.1676–c.1711)

Madagascar

- Merina Kingdom (complete list) –

- Ralambo, King (1575–1612)
- Andrianjaka, King (1612–1630)
- Andriantsitakatrandriana, King (1630–1650)
- Andriantsimitoviaminandriandehibe, King (1650–1670)
- Andrianjaka Razakatsitakatrandriana, King (1670–1675)
- Andriamasinavalona, King (1675–1710)

- Boina Kingdom (complete list) –

- Andriamandisoarivo (Tsimanata), King (c.1690–1720)

=== Africa: Northcentral ===
Tunisia

- Eyalet of Tunis: Muradid dynasty –

- Murad I, Bey (1613–1631)
- Hammuda Pasha, Bey (1631–1666)
- Murad II, Bey (1666–1675)
- Mohamed El Mouradi, Bey (1686–1696)

=== Africa: Northeast ===
Egypt

Sudan

- Sultanate of Darfur (complete list) –

- Sulayman Solong, Sultan (c.1660–c.1680)
- Musa Sulayman, Sultan (c.1680–?)

- Funj Sultanate (complete list) –

- Unsa I, Sultan (1591–1603/4)
- Abd al-Qadir II, Sultan (1603/4–1606)
- Adlan I, Sultan (1606–1611/2)
- Badi I, Sultan (1611/2–1616/7)
- Rabat I, Sultan (1616/7–1644/5)
- Badi II, Sultan (1644/5–1681)
- Unsa II, Sultan (1681–1692)
- Badi III, Sultan (1692–1716)

=== Africa: Northwest ===
Algeria

- Regency of Algiers (Sultans / Governors) –

Vassal state, 1671–1830
- Ismail, Pasha (1659–1686)
- Mezzo Morto Hüseyin, Pasha (1686–1687)
- Mustapha V, Pasha (1694)
- Umar Pasha, Pasha (1694–1695)
- Musa, Pasha (1695–1698)
- Umar Pasha, Pasha (1698–1700)

Pashas without power, 1700–1711

Morocco

- Saadi dynasty of Morocco (complete list) –

- Ahmad al-Mansur, Sultan (1578–1603)

Succession war: 1603–1627

- Abu Faris Abdallah, Sultan (1603–1608)
- Zidan Abu Maali, Sultan (1603–1627)
- Abd al-Malik II, Sultan (1627–1631)
- Al-Walid ibn Zidan, Sultan (1631–1636)
- Mohammed esh-Sheikh es-Seghir, Sultan (1636–1655)
- Ahmad al-Abbas, Sultan (1655–1659)

- Morocco, Dila'i interlude (complete list) –

- Muhammad al-Haj ad-Dila'i, Sultan (1659–1663)

- Alaouite dynasty of Morocco (complete list) –

- Al-Rashid, Sultan (1666–1672)
- Ismail Ibn Sharif, Sultan (1672–1727)

=== Africa: South ===
Angola

- Kingdom of Ndongo (complete list) –

- Mbandi a Ngola, Ngola (1592–1617)
- Ngola Mbandi, Ngola (1617–1624)
- Nzinga of Ndongo and Matamba, Queen (1624–1626)
under Portuguese vassalage
- Hari a Kiluanje, King (1626)
- Hari, King (1626–1657)
of Ndongo-Matamba;
- Nzinga of Ndongo and Matamba, Queen (1657–1663)
of the state of Pungo a Ndongo;
- Mukambu Mbandi, Queen (1663–1671)

Mozambique

- Portuguese Mozambique (complete list) –

Colony, 1498–1972
For details see the Kingdom of Portugal under Southwest Europe

South Africa

- Dutch Cape Colony (complete list) –

Company rule of the Dutch East India Company, 1652–1795; British occupation, 1795–1803
For details see the Netherlands under western Europe

Zimbabwe

- Kingdom of Mutapa (complete list) –

- Gatsi Rusere, Mwenemutapa (1589–1623)
- Nyambu Kapararidze, Mwenemutapa (1623–1629)

becomes a Portuguese vassal (1629)

- Mavura Mhande Felipe, Mwenemutapa (1629–1652)
- Siti Kazurukamusapa, Mwenemutapa (1652–1663)

becomes a Rozwi Vassal (1663)

- Kamharapasu Mukombwe, Mwenemutapa (1663–1692)
- Nyakambira, Mwenemutapa (1692–1694)

returns to Portuguese vassalage (1694)

- Nyamaende Mhande, Mwenemutapa (1694–1707)

- Rozvi Empire (complete list) –

- Changamire Tumbare, King (1530–c.1660)
- Changamire Dombo, King (c.1660–1695)
- Changamire Zharare, King (c.1695–c.1700)
- Changamire Negamo, King (c.1700–1710)

=== Africa: West ===
Benin

- Kingdom of Benin (complete list) –

- Ehengbuda, Oba (1580–1602)
- Ohuan, Oba (1602–1656)
- Ohenzae, Oba (1656–1661)
- Akenzae, Oba (1661–1669)
- Akengboi, Oba (1669–1675)
- Akenkpaye, Oba (1675–1684)
- Akengbedo, Oba (1684–1689)
- Ore-Oghene, Oba (1689–1701)

- Abomey (complete list) –

- Do-Aklin, ruler (c.1600)
- Dakodonou, ruler (c.1625–1645)

- Hogbonu (complete list) –

- Té-Agbanlin, Ahosu (1688–1729)

Burkina Faso

- Mossi Kingdom of Nungu (complete list) –

- Kampadiboaghi, Nunbado (1571–1615)
- Kampadi, Nunbado (1615–1659)
- Tantiari, Nunbado (1659–1684)
- Lissoangui, Nunbado (1684–1709)

Cape Verde

- Portuguese Cape Verde (complete list) –

Colony, 1462–1951
For details see the Kingdom of Portugal under Southwest Europe

Ghana

- Kingdom of Ashanti (complete list) –

- Osei Kofi Tutu I, Asantehene (c.1675/80–1717)

- Denkyira, or Agona (complete list) –

- Mumunumfi, Agonahene (1588–1620)
- Mumunumfi, Denkyirahene (1620–1624)
- Werempe Ampem, Denkyirahene (1624–1637)
- Boa Amponsem I, Denkyirahene (1637–1695)
- Ntim Gyakari, Denkyirahene (1695–1701)

Guinea-Bissau

- Portuguese Guinea (complete list) –

Colony, 1474–1951
For details see the Kingdom of Portugal under Southwest Europe

Mali

- Mali Empire: Keita dynasty (complete list) –

- Mahmud IV, Mansa (1590s–1600s)

- Kénédougou Kingdom –

- Nanka Traoré, Faama (c.1650–?)

Niger

- Dendi Kingdom: Askiya dynasty (complete list) –

- al-Mustafa, Askiya (c.1600)
- Muhammad Sorko-ije, Askiya (early 17th century)
- Harun Dankataya, Askiya (early 17th century)
- al-Amin, Askiya (1611–1618)
- Dawud II, Askiya (1618–1639)
- Ismail, Askiya (c.1639)
- Muhammad, Askiya (1639)
- Dawud III, Askiya (1639–?)
- Muhammad Borgo, Askiya (early 17th century)
- Mar-Chindin, Askiya (early 17th century)
- Nuh II, Askiya (early 17th century)
- Muhammad Al-Borko, Askiya (early 17th century)
- Al-Hajj, Askiya (mid 17th century)
- Ismail, Askiya (mid 17th century)
- Dawud III, Askiya (c.1655)

Nigeria

- Bornu Empire (Kanem–Bornu) (complete list) –

- Muhammed VI Bukalmarami, Mai (1596–1612)
- Ibrahim III of Bornu, Mai (1612–1619)
- Umar, Mai (1619–1639)
- Ali II, Mai (1639–1677)
- Idris IV of Bornu, Mai (1677–1696)
- Dunama VII, Mai (1696–1715)

• Gobir Empire

• Ibrahim Babari. (16th century)

• Bawa Jangwarzo (17th century)

• Muhammadu Yumfa 18th century)

- Oyo Empire (complete list) –

- Abipa, Alaafin (c.1600–?)
- Obalokun, Alaafin (17th century)
- Oluodo, Alaafin (17th century)
- Ajagbo, Alaafin (17th century)
- Odarawu, Alaafin (17th century)
- Kanran, Alaafin (17th century)
- Jayin, Alaafin (17th century or 18th century)

- Sultanate of Kano (complete list) –

- Muhammad Zaki, Sultan (1582–1618)
- Muhammad Nazaki, Sultan (1618–1623)
- Kutumbi, Sultan (1623–1648)
- al-Hajj, Sultan (1648–1649)
- Shekarau (emir), Sultan (1649–1651)
- Muhammad Kukuna, Sultan (1651–1652, 1652–1660)
- Soyaki, Sultan (1652)
- Bawa, Sultan (1660–1670)
- Dadi, Sultan (1670–1703)

- Lagos (complete list) –

- Ashipa, Oba (c.1682–1716)

- Kingdom of Nri (complete list) –

- Eze Nri Agụ, King (1583–1676)
- Eze Nri Apia and Nri–Alike, King (1677–1700)

Senegal

- Cayor (complete list) –

- Lat Sukabe, Damel (1697–1719)

- Kingdom of Jolof (complete list) –

- Gireun Buri Dyelen, Buur-ba (1597–1605)
- Birayma Penda, Buur-ba (1605–1649)
- Birayma Mba, Buur-ba (1649–1670)
- Bakar Penda, Buur-ba (1670–1711)

- Waalo (complete list) –

- Naatago Aram Bakar, King (1674–1708)

Sierra Leone

- Kingdom of Koya (complete list) –

- Naimbanna I, Bai (1680–1720)

== Americas ==
=== Americas: Caribbean ===
Antigua

- Colonial Antigua (complete list) –

British colony, 1632–1981
For details see the United Kingdom under British Isles, Europe

The Bahamas

- Colony of the Bahamas (complete list) –

British colony, 1648–1973
For details see the United Kingdom under British Isles, Europe

Barbados

- Colonial Barbados (complete list) –

British colony, 1625–1966
For details see the United Kingdom under British Isles, Europe

Cuba

- Captaincy General of Cuba (complete list) –

Spanish Colony, 1607–1898
For details see Spain in southwest Europe

Haiti

- Saint-Domingue (complete list) –

French Colony, 1625–1804
For details see France in western Europe

Netherlands

- Curaçao and Dependencies (complete list) –

Dutch colony 1634–1828, 1845–1954
For details see the Netherlands under western Europe

=== Americas: Central ===
Guatemala

- Captaincy General of Guatemala (complete list) –

Spanish Colony, 1609–1821
For details see Spain in southwest Europe

Nicaragua

- Miskito Coast (complete list) –

- Oldman, King (c.1650–c.1687)
- Jeremy I, King (c.1687–1718)

=== Americas: North ===
Canada

- Canada (New France) (complete list) –

French colony, 1535–1763
For details see France under western Europe

- Newfoundland Colony (complete list) –

British colony, 1610–1907
For details see the United Kingdom under British Isles, Europe

Mexico

- Viceroyalty of New Spain (complete list) –

Spanish Colony, 1521–1821
For details see Spain in southwest Europe

=== Americas: South ===
Brazil

- Colonial Brazil (complete list) –

Portuguese colony, 1500/1534–1808
For details see the Kingdom of Portugal under Southwest Europe

Chile

- Captaincy General of Chile (complete list) –

Spanish Colony, 1541–1818
For details see Spain in southwest Europe

Peru

- Viceroyalty of Peru (complete list) –

Spanish Colony, 1542–1824
For details see Spain in southwest Europe

Suriname

- English Surinam (complete list) –

English/ British colony, 1650–1667
For details see the United Kingdom under British Isles, Europe

- Dutch Surinam (complete list) –

Dutch colony 1667–1954
For details see the Netherlands under western Europe

== Asia ==
=== Asia: Central ===
Kazakhstan

- Dzungar Khanate (complete list) –

- Khara Khula, Khong Tayiji (early 1600s–1634)
- Erdeni Batur, Khong Tayiji (1634–1653)
- Sengge, Khong Tayiji (1653–1670)
- Galdan Boshugtu, Khong Tayiji (1670–1697)
- Tsewang Arabtan, Khong Tayiji (1694–1727)

- Kazakh Khanate (complete list) –

- Esim, Khan (1598–1628)
- Zhangir, Khan (1628–1652)
- Batyr, Khan (1652–1680)
- Tauke, Khan (1680–1718)

Mongolia

- Altan Khan of the Khalkha (complete list) –

- Ubasi Khong Tayiji, Khan (?–1623)
- Badma Erdeni Khong Tayiji, Khan (1623–?)
- Erinchin Lobsang Tayiji, Khan (c.1658–c.1691)

Tajikistan

- Yarkent Khanate, Western Moghulistan (complete list) –

- Muhammad, Khan (1591–1610)
- Shudja ad-Din Ahmad, Khan (1610–1618)
- Kuraysh, Khan (1618)
- Abd al-Latif, Khan (1618–1630)
- Ahmad, Khan (1630–1633)
- Mahmud, Khan (1633–1636)
- Ahmad, Khan (1636–1638)
- Abdullah, Khan (1638–1669)
- Nur ad-Din, Khan (1667–1668)
- Ismail, Khan (1669–1670)
- YuIbars, Khan (1669–1670)
- Abd al Latif, Khan (1670)
- Ismail, Khan (1670–1680)
- Abd ar-Rashid II, Khan (1680–1682)
- Muhammad Amin, Khan (1682–1692)
- Abakh Khoja, Khan (1692–1694)
- Yahiya Khoja, Khan (1694–1695)
- Hanim Padsha, Khatun (1695)
- Akbash, Khan (1695–1705)

Tibet

- Guge

- Khri Grags pa'i dBang phyug, King (c.1600)
- Khri Nam rgyal Grags pa lde, King (fl. 1618)
- Khri bKra shis Grags pa lde, King (pre-1622–1630)

- Phagmodrupa dynasty (complete list) –

- Ngawang Drakpa Gyaltsen, Monarch (1576–1603/1604)
- Mipham Wanggyur Gyalpo, Monarch (1604–1613)
- Mipham Sonam Wangchuk Drakpa Namgyal Palzang, Monarch (early 17th century)

- Tsangpa (complete list) –

- Khunpang Lhawang Dorje, Monarch (c.1582–1605/1606)
- Karma Thutob Namgyal, Monarch (c.1586–1610)
- Karma Tensung, Monarch (1599–1611)
- Karma Phuntsok Namgyal, Monarch (1611–1620)
- Karma Tenkyong, Monarch (1620–1642)

- Khoshut Khanate of Tibet

- Khans (complete list) –

- Güshi, Khan (1642–1655)
- Dayan, Khan (1655–1668)
- Tenzin Dalai, Khan (1668–1696)
- Tenzin Wangchuk, Khan (1696–1697)
- Lha-bzang, Khan (1697–1717)

- Dalai Lamas (complete list) –

- Ngawang Lobsang Gyatso, 5th Dalai Lama (1642–1682)
- Tsangyang Gyatso, 6th Dalai Lama (1697–1706)

Uzbekistan

- Khanate of Bukhara –

- Baqi Muhammad, Khan (1599–1605)
- Vali Muhammad, Khan (1605–1611)
- Imam Quli, Khan (1611–1642)
- Nadr Muhammad, Khan (1642–1645)
- Abdu'l-Aziz, Khan (1645–1680)
- Subhan Quli, Khan (1680–1702)

- Khanate of Khiva (complete list) –

- Haji Muhammad I, Khan (1558–1602)
- Arab Muhammad I, Khan (1602–1623)
- Isfandiyar, Khan (1623–1643)
- Abu al-Ghazi Bahadur, Khan (1643–1663)
- Anusha, Khan (1663–1685)
- unnamed, Khan (1685–1714)
- Khudaydad, Khan (1685–1687)
- Muhammad Awrang I, Khan (1687–1694)
- Chuchaq, Khan (1694–1697)
- Vali, Khan (1697–1698)
- Ishaq Agha Shah Niyaz, Khan (1698–1701)

- Kalmyk Khanate (complete list) –

- Kho Orluk, Khan (1633–1644)
- Shukhur Daichin, Khan (1644–1661)
- Puntsug, Khan (1661–1672)
- Ayuka, Khan (1672–1723)

=== Asia: East ===
China

- Ming dynasty (complete list) –

- Wanli, Emperor (1572–1620)
- Taichang, Emperor (1620)
- Tianqi, Emperor (1620–1627)
- Chongzhen, Emperor (1627–1644)

- Southern Ming (complete list) –

- Zhu Yousong, Emperor (1644–1645)
- Zhu Yujian, Emperor (1645–1646)
- Zhu Yihai, Regent / Emperor (1645–1655)
- Zhu Yuyue, Emperor (1646–1647)
- Zhu Youlang, ruler (1646–1647)
- Zhu Changqing, ruler (1648–1649)

- Shun dynasty –

- Li Zicheng, Emperor (1643–1645)

- Qing dynasty (complete list) –

- Nurhaci, Khan (1616–1626)
- Hong Taiji, Khan (1626–1636), Emperor (1636–1643)
- Shunzhi, Emperor (1643–1661)
- Kangxi, Emperor (1661–1722)

China: Taiwan

- Dutch Formosa (complete list) –

Dutch colony 1624–1668
For details see the Netherlands under western Europe

- Kingdom of Middag –

- Kamachat Aslamie, King, (?–1648)
- Kamachat Maloe, King, (1648–?)

- Spanish Formosa (complete list) –

Spanish Colony, 1626–1642
For details see Spain in southwest Europe

- Kingdom of Tungning: House of Koxinga (complete list) –

- Zheng Chenggong, Prince (1661–1662)
- Zheng Xi, Protector (1662)
- Zheng Jing, Prince (1662–1681)
- Zheng Kezang, Prince Regent (1681)
- Zheng Keshuang, Prince (1681–1683)

Japan

- Tokugawa shogunate of Japan

- Emperors (complete list) –

- Go-Yōzei, Emperor (1586–1611)
- Go-Mizunoo, Emperor (1611–1629)
- Meishō, Empress (1629–1643)
- Go-Kōmyō, Emperor (1643–1654)
- Go-Sai, Emperor (1655–1663)
- Reigen, Emperor (1663–1687)
- Higashiyama, Emperor (1687–1709)

- Shōguns (complete list) –

- Tokugawa Ieyasu, Shōgun (1603–1605)
- Tokugawa Hidetada, Shōgun (1605–1623)
- Tokugawa Iemitsu, Shōgun (1623–1651)
- Tokugawa Ietsuna, Shōgun (1641–1680)
- Tokugawa Tsunayoshi, Shōgun (1680–1709)

- Ryukyu Kingdom: Second Shō dynasty –

Tributary state of the Ming dynasty, 1429–1644
- Shō Nei, King (1589–1620)
Vassal state of Satsuma Domain, 1609–1872
- Shō Hō, King (1621–1640)
- Shō Ken, King (1641–1647)
- Shō Shitsu, King (1648–1668)
- Shō Tei, King (1669–1709)

Korea

- Joseon (complete list) –

- Seonjo, King (1567–1608)
- Gwanghaegun, King (1608–1623)
- Injo, King (1623–1649)
- Hyojong, King (1649–1659)
- Hyeonjong, King (1659–1674)
- Sukjong, King (1674–1720)

Mongolia

- Alliance of the Four Oirat (complete list) –

- Kharkhul, leader (1606–1634)

- Northern Yuan dynasty (complete list) –

- Buyan Sechen, Khan (1592–1603)
- Ligdan, Khan (1604–1634)
- Ejei, Khan (1634–1635)

=== Asia: Southeast ===
Brunei

- Bruneian Empire (complete list) –

- Abdul Jalilul Akbar, Sultan (1598–1659)
- Abdul Jalilul Jabbar, Sultan (1659–1660)
- Muhammad Ali, Sultan (1660–1661)
- Abdul Hakkul Mubin, Sultan (1660–1673)
- Muhyiddin, Sultan (1673–1690)
- Nassaruddin, Sultan (1690–1710)

Cambodia

- Kingdom of Cambodia: Middle Period (complete list) –

- Ponhea Nhom, King (1600–1603)
- Barom Reachea IV, King (1603–1618)
- Chey Chettha II, King (1618–1628)
- Outey, King (1628–1642)
- Thommoreachea II or Sri Dharmaraja II, King (1628–1630)
- Batom Reachea or Padumaraja I, King (1640–1642)
- Ramathipadi I, King (1642–1658)
- Barom Reachea V or Paramaraja IX, King (1658–1672)
- Chey Chettha III or Padumaraja II, King (1672–1673)
- Kaev Hua II, King (1673–1674)
- Padumaraja III, King (1674)
- Chey Chettha IV, King (1675–1695, 1696–1699, 1700–1702, 1703–1706)
- Outey I or Narai Ramathipadi II, King (1695–1696)
- Barom Ramadhipati or Kaev Hua III, King (1699–1700, 1710–1722)

Indonesia

Indonesia: Java

- Banten Sultanate (complete list) –

- Pangeran Ratu, Sultan (1596–1651)
- Abu’lma’ali Ahmad, Sultan (1638–c.1650)
- Ageng Tirtayasa, Sultan (1651–1683)
- Abu an-Nasr, Sultan (1682–1687)
- Abdul Fadhl, Sultan (1687–1690)
- Abdul Mahasin Muhammad Zainulabidin, Sultan (1690–1733)

- Sultanate of Cirebon (complete list) –

- Panembahan Ratu, Sultan (c.1570–1649)
- Panembahan Girilaya, Sultan (c.1650–1662)
Split into the Kraton Kasepuhan, Kraton Kanoman, Kraton Kacirebonan, Panembahan Cirebon lines

- Sultanate of Cirebon: Kraton Kacirebonan (complete list) –

- Pangeran Arya Cirebon, Kamaruddin, Sultan (1697–1723)

- Blambangan Kingdom (complete list) –

- Mas Karian, King (?–1632)
- Sunan Tawang Alun I, King (1633–1639)
- Tawang Alun II, King (1665–1691)
- Pangeran Pati, King (1691)
- Sasranegara, Co-King (1691–1692)
- Mancanapura, King (1691–1697)
- Pangeran Putr, King (1697–1736)

- Giri –

- Sunan Prapen, Sultan (1548–1605)
- Panembahan Kawis Gua, Sultan (1605–1621)
- Panembahan Agung, Sultan (1621–1626)
- Panembahan Mas Witana, Sultan (1626–1680)

- Pasuruan –

- Adipati Pekik, King (?–1614)
- Ki Gede Kapulungan, Regent (c.1614–1616/17)
- Surapati, Wiranegara I, Sultan (1686–1706)

- Duchy of Surabaya (complete list) –

- Panembahan Rama, Adipati (16th/17th century)
- Pangeran Surabaya, Adipati (16th/17th century)
- Pangeran Sunjaya, Adipati (17th century)
- Raden Jayalengkara, Adipati (?–1625)

- Tuban –

- Arya Salempe, King (16th/17th century)
- Pangeran Dalem, King (?–1619)

- Cirebon, Keraton Kasepuhan (complete list) –

- Sepuh I Syamsuddin, Sultan (1662–1697)
- Sepuh II Jamaluddin, Sultan (1697–1723)

- Cirebon, Kraton Kanoman (complete list) –

- Anom I Badruddin, Sultan (1662–1703)

- Cirebon, Panembahan line (complete list) –

- Panembahan Cirebon I Muhammad Nasruddin, Sultan (1662–1714)

- Cirebon, Kraton Kacirebonan (complete list) –

- Pangeran Arya Cirebon, Kamaruddin, Sultan (1697–1723)

- Bangkalan –

- Raden Kara, Sultan (1592/6–1621)
- Pangeran Mas, Sultan (1621–1624)
- Cakraningrat I, Sultan (1624–1648)
- Raden Demang Malaya Kusuma, Regent (1648–1656)
- Cakraningrat II, Sultan (1648–1707)

- Sumenep –

- Pangeran Wetan, Sultan (c.1600)
- Pangeran Ellor II, Sultan (?–1624)
- Kyai Mas Anggadipa, Sultan (1624–?)
- Arya Yang Pati, Sultan (?–1671)
- Yudanegara, Sultan (1671–1684)
- Pulang Jiwa, Sultan (1684–1702)

- Pamekasan –

- Adikara I, Sultan (1685–1708)

- Mataram Sultanate (complete list) –

- Senopati, Sultan (1587–1601)
- Raden Mas Jolang, Sultan (1601–1613)
- Agung, Sultan (1613–1645)
- Amangkurat I, Sultan (1646–1677)
- Amangkurat II, Susuhunan (1677–1703)

Indonesia: Sumatra

- Aceh Sultanate (complete list) –

- Alauddin Ri'ayat Syah Sayyid al-Mukammal, Sultan (1589–1604)
- Ali Ri'ayat Syah III, Sultan (1604–1607)
- Iskandar Muda, Sultan (1607–1636)
- Iskandar Thani, Sultan (1636–1641)
- Taj ul-Alam, Queen (1641–1675)
- Nurul Alam Naqiatuddin Syah, Queen (1675–1678)
- Inayat Zakiatuddin Syah, Queen (1678–1688)
- Zainatuddin, Queen (1688–1699)
- Badr ul-Alam Syarif Hasyim Jamaluddin, Sultan (1699–1702)

- Sultanate of Deli (complete list) –

- Gocah Pahlawan, Sultan (1632–1669)
- Perunggit, Sultan (1669–1698)
- Tuanku Panglima Paderap, Sultan (1698–1728)

- Sultanate of Langkat –

- Panglima Dewa Sakti, Raja (1580–1612)
- Kahar bin Panglima Dewa Sakdi, Raja (1612–1673)
- Bendahara Raja Badiuzzaman, Raja (1673–1750)

- Johor Sultanate (complete list) –

- Alauddin Riayat Shah III, Sultan (1597–1615)
- Abdullah Ma'ayat Shah, Sultan (1615–1623)
- Abdul Jalil Shah III, Sultan of Pahang (1615–1617) of Johor (1623–1677)
- Ibrahim Shah, Sultan (1677–1685)
- Mahmud Shah II, Sultan (1685–1699)
- Abdul Jalil Shah IV, Sultan (1699–1720)

- Jambi Sultanate –
  Hilir Jambi, Sultan (1687–1696)
  Sultan Sri Maharaja Batu, Sultan (1690–1721)

Indonesia: Kalimantan (Borneo)

- Sultanate of Banjar (complete list) –

- Mustain Billah, Sultan (1595–1638)
- Inayatullah bin Mustainbillah, Sultan (1642–1647)
- Saidullah, Sultan (1647–1660)
- Ri'ayatullah, Sultan (1660–1663)
- Amrullah Bagus Kasuma, Sultan (1663–1679)
- Agung/Pangeran Suryanata II, Sultan (1663–1679)
- Amrullah Bagus Kasuma, Sultan (1679–1700)
- Tahmidullah I, Sultan (1700–1717)

- Bulungan –

- Kelana, Putera Singa Laut, Wira (1618–1640)
- Keranda, Putera Wira Kelana, Wira (1640–1695)
- Digendung, putra Wira Keranda, Wira (1695–1731)

- Kutai Kartanegara Sultanate –

- Aji Pangeran Sinum Panji Mendapa, Sultan (c.1635–1650)

- Sultanate of Sambas (complete list) –

- Timbang Paseban, Governor, Sultan (1600–1609)
- Sepudak, King (1609–1632)
- Anom Kesumayuda, King (1632–1670)
- Muhammad Shafi ud-din I, Sultan (1675–1685)
- Muhammad Taj ud-din I, Sultan (1685–1708)

- Sultanate of Sintang –

- Abang Pencin Pontin, Prince (c.1600–1643)
- Tunggal, Prince (c.1643–1672)
- Sri Paduka Muhammad Shams ud-din Sa'id ul-Khairiwaddien Sultan Nata, Sultan (1672–1738)

Indonesia: Sulawesi

- Bone state –

- Latenri Tuppu Matinro Ri Sidenreng, King (c.1605)

- Sultanate of Gowa –

- Alau'ddin, Sultan (1593–1639)
- Malikussaid (Muhammad Said), Sultan (1639–1653)
- Hasanuddin, Sultan (1653–1669)
- Amir Hamzah, Sultan (1669–1674)
- Muhammad Ali (Karaeng Bisei), Sultan (1674–1677)
- Abdul Jalil, Sultan (1677–1709)

- Luwu –

- Andi Pattiware’ Daeng Parabung, Datu (1587–1615)
- Patipasaung, Datu (1615–1637)
- La Basso, Datu (1637–1663)
- Settiaraja, Datu (1663–1704)
- Petta Matinroe’ ri Polka, Datu (1660s)

Indonesia: Lesser Sunda Islands

- Adonara (complete list) –

- Foramma, Raja (1650)
- Boli I, Raja (1671–1684)
- Eke, Raja (1684–1688)

- Bali Kingdom: Gelgel (complete list) –

- Dalem Seganing, King (c.1580–1623 or ?–1650)
- Dalem Di Made, King (1623–1642 or 1655–1665)
- Dewa Pacekan, King (1642–1650)
- Dewa Cawu, King (1651–c.1655)
- Anglurah Agung, usurper King (c.1665–1686)

- Kingdom of Larantuka –

- Ola Adobala, Raja (c.1665)
- Luis, Raja (c.1675)

- Bima Sultanate (complete list) –

- Abdul Kahir, Sultan (c.1620–1640)
- Ambela Abu'l-Khair Sirajuddin, Sultan (1640–1682)
- Nuruddin Abubakar Ali Syah, Sultan (1682–1687)
- Jamaluddin Ali Syah, Sultan (1687–1696)
- Hasanuddin Muhammad Ali Syah, Sultan (1697–1731)

Indonesia: West Timor

- Amanatun (complete list) –

- Pedro of Batumean, Raja (c.1642)
- João of Batumean, Raja (c.1645)

- Amarasi (complete list) –

- Dom António I, Raja (?–1665)
- Dom Tomás, Raja (1665–?)
- Dom António II, Raja (c.1688)

- Amabi (complete list) –

- Sebastião, Raja (c.1652)
- Saroro Neno, Raja (c.1655)
- Ama Kefi Meu, Raja (1666–1704)

- Sonbai Besar (complete list) –

- Ama Tuan/ Ama Utang, Emperor (c.1650–c.1680)

- Sonbai Kecil (complete list) –

- Ama Tuan II, Raja (1659–1672)
- Bi Sonbai/ Usi Tetu Utang, Queen (1672–1717)

- Taebenu

- Tanof I, Raja (1688–1700)

Indonesia: Maluku Islands

- Sultanate of Bacan (complete list) –

- Alauddin I, Sultan (1581–c.1609)
- Nurusalat, Sultan (c.1609–1649)
- Muhammad Ali, Sultan (1649–1660)
Dutch protectorate 1667–1942
- Alauddin II, Sultan (1660–1706)

- Sultanate of Jailolo –

- Kodrat, Sultan (?–c.1605)
- Dua, Sultan (c.1605–1613)
- Raja Buka, Sultan (1613–1656)
- Kaicil Alam, Sultan (c.1679–1684)

- Sultanate of Tidore (complete list) –

- Mole Majimu, Sultan (1599–1627)
- Ngarolamo, Sultan (1627–1634)
- Gorontalo, Sultan (1634–1639)
- Saidi, Sultan (1640–1657)
- Saifuddin, Golofino, Sultan (1657–1689)
Dutch protectorate 1657–1905
- Hamza Faharuddin, Sultan (1689–1705)

- Sultanate of Ternate (complete list) –

- Said Barakat Shah, Sultan (1583–1606)
- Muzaffar Shah I, Sultan (1607–1627)
- Hamzah, Sultan (1627–1648)
- Mandar Shah/ Manlarsaha, Sultan (1648–1650)
- Manilha, Sultan (1650–1655)
- Mandar Shah, Sultan (1655–1675)
Dutch protectorate 1683–1915
- Sibori, Sultan (1675–1689)
- Said Fathullah, Sultan (1689–1714)

Indonesia: Papua

- Kingdom of Fatagar (complete list) –

- Maraitat, Raja (1600s)

Laos

- Lan Xang (complete list) –

- Voravongsa II, King (1598–1622)
- Oupagnouvarath, King (1622–1623)
- Photisarath II, King (1623–1627)
- Mon Keo, King (1621–1622)
- Tone Kham, King (1627–1633)
- Vichai, King (1633–1637)
- Souligna Vongsa, King (1637–1695)
- Tian Thala, King (c.1695)
- Ong Lo, King (1694–1698)
- Nan Tharat, King (1699)
- Setthathirath II, King (1700–1707)

- Muang Phuan (complete list) –

- Kham Sanh, King (1651–1688)
- Kam Lan, King (1688–1700)

Malaysia

Malaysia: Peninsula

- Kedah Sultanate (complete list) –

- Mudzaffar Shah III, Sultan, (1547–1602)
- Sulaiman Shah II, Sultan, (1602–1626)
- Rijaluddin Muhammad Shah, Sultan, (1626–1652)
- Muhyiddin Mansur Shah, Sultan, (1652–1662)
- Dziaddin Mukarram Shah I, Sultan, (1662–1688)
- Ataullah Muhammad Shah II, Sultan, (1688–1698)
- Abdullah Mu'adzam Shah, Sultan, (1698–1706)

- Kelantan Sultanate: Champa dynasty (complete list) –

- Muhammad ibni al-Marhum Sultan Ibrahim, Sultan (1597–1602)
- Addil ud-din, Sultan (1579–1597, 1602–1605)
- Samir ud-din, Sultan (1605–1616)
- 'Abdu'l Kadir, Sultan (1616–1637)
- Sakti I, Raja (1637–1649)
- Loyor bin Raja Sakti I, Raja (1649–1663)
- Puteri Saadong, Raja (1663–1667)
- Sa'adong I, Rata (1667–1671)
- Abdul Rahim, Sultan (1671–1676)
- Omar Ibni Al-Marhum Raja Sakti I, Sultan (1675–1721)

- Pahang Sultanate (complete list) –

- Abdul Ghafur Muhiuddin Shah, Sultan (1592–1614)
- Alauddin Riayat Shah, Sultan (1614–1615)
- Abdul Jalil Shah III, Sultan (1615–1617) of Johor (1623–1677)
- Abdul Jalil Shah III, Sultan of Pahang (1615–1617), Sultan of Johor (1623–1677)

- Johor Sultanate (complete list) –

- Alauddin Riayat Shah III, Sultan (1597–1615)
- Abdullah Ma'ayat Shah, Sultan (1615–1623)
- Abdul Jalil Shah III, Sultan of Pahang (1615–1617), Sultan of Johor (1623–1677)
- Ibrahim Shah, Sultan (1677–1685)
- Mahmud II, Sultan (1685–1699)
- Abdul Jalil Shah IV, Sultan (1699–1720)

- Perak Sultanate (complete list) –

Malacca dynasty
- Alauddin Riayat Shah I, Sultan (1594–1603)
- Mukaddam Riayat Shah I, Sultan (1603–1619)
- Ahmad Mansur Riayat Shah II, Sultan (1619–1627)
- Mahmud Riayat Shah I, Sultan (1627–1630)
- Sallehuddin Riayat Shah, Sultan (1630–1636)
Siak dynasty
- Muzaffar Riayat Shah II, Sultan (1636–1653)
- Mahmud Iskandar Shah, Sultan (1653–1720)

Malaysian Borneo

- Sultanate of Sarawak –

- Tengah, Sultan (1599–1641)

Myanmar / Burma

- Kingdom of Mrauk U (complete list) –

- Razagyi, King (1593–1612)
- Khamaung, King (1612–1622)
- Thiri Thudhamma, King (1622–1638)
- Sanay, King (1638)
- Narapati, King (1638–1645)
- Thado, King (1645–1652)
- Sanda Thudhamma, King (1652–1674)
- Thiri Thuriya, King (1674–1685)
- Wara Dhammaraza, King (1685–1692)
- Muni Thudhammaraza, King (1692–1694)
- Sanda Thuriya I, King (1694–1696)
- Nawrahta, King (1696)
- Mayuppiya, King (1696–1697)
- Kalamandat, King (1697–1698)
- Naradipati, King (1698–1700)
- Sanda Wimala I, King (1700–1707)

- Toungoo dynasty (complete list) –

- Nyaungyan Min, King (1599–1605)
- Anaukpetlun, King (1605–1628)
- Minyedeippa, King (1628–1629)
- Thalun, King (1629–1648)
- Pindale Min, King (1648–1661)
- Pye Min, King (1661–1672)
- Narawara, King (1672–1673)
- Minyekyawdin, King (1673–1698)
- Sanay Min, King (1698–1714)

Philippines

- Sultanate of Sulu (complete list) –

- Batarah Shah Tengah, Sultan (1596–1608)
- Muwallil Wasit I, Sultan (1610–1650)
- Muhammad Kudarat, Sultan of Maguindanao (1619–1671), Sultan of Sulu as Nasir ud-Din II (1645–1648)
- Salah ud-Din, Sultan (1649/50–1680)
- Ali Shah, Sultan (late 17th century)
- Nur ul-Azam, ruler (late 17th century)
- Shahab ud-Din, Sultan (1685–1710)

- Sultanate of Maguindanao (complete list) –

- Kapitan Laut Buisan, Sultan (1597–1619)
- Muhammad Kudarat, Sultan of Maguindanao (1619–1671), Sultan of Sulu as Nasir ud-Din II (1645–1648)
- Barahaman, Sultan (c.1678–1699)
- Kahar Ud-din Kuda, Sultan (?–1702)

- Spanish East Indies, part of the Captaincy General of the Philippines (complete list) –

Colony, 1565–1901
For details see Spain in southwest Europe

Thailand

- Ayutthaya Kingdom (complete list) –

Sukhothai dynasty
- Naresuan, King of Sukhothai (1570–1590), King of Ayutthaya (1590–1605)
- Ekathotsarot, King (1605–1620)
- Si Saowaphak, King (1620)
- Songtham, King (1620–1628)
- Chetthathirat, King (1628–1629)
- Athittayawong, King (1629)
Prasat Thong dynasty
- Prasat Thong, King (1629–1656)
- Chai, King (1656)
- Si Suthammaracha, King (1656)
- Narai, King (1656–1688)
Ban Phlu Luang dynasty
- Phetracha, King (1688–1703)

- Lan Na: Burmese rule (complete list) –

- Nawrahta Minsaw, King (1579–1607/08)
- Thado Minsaw (Phra Choi), King (1607/08–1608/09)
- Minye Deibba (Phra Chaiyathip), King (1608/09–1614)
- Thado Kyaw, King (1614)
- Si Songmueang, King (1615–1631)
- Thipphanet, Lord (1631–1655)
- Phra Saenmueang, King (1655–1659)
- King of Phrae, King (1659–1672)
- Uengsae of Ava, Viceroy (1672–1675)
- Che Putarai, King (1675–1707)

- Pattani Kingdom (complete list) –

Inland dynasty

- Ratu Hijau, Queen (1584–1616)
- Ratu Biru, Queen (1616–1624)
- Ratu Ungu, Queen (1624–1635)
- Ratu Kuning, Queen (1635–1649/88)

First Kelantanese dynasty

- Bakal, Raja (1688–1690 or 1651–1670)
- Emas Kelantan, Raja (1690–1704 or 1670–1698)
- Emas Chayam, Queen (1704–1707 or 1698–1702 and 1716–1718)

Vietnam

- Champa (complete list) –

- Po Ro Me, King (1627–1651)
- Po Niga, King (1652–1660)
- Po Saut, King (1660–1692)
- Po Saktirai da putih, King (1695–1728)

- Đại Việt: Mạc dynasty (complete list) –

- Mạc Kính Cung, Emperor (1593–1625)
- Mạc Kính Khoan, Emperor (1623–1638)
- Mạc Kính Vũ, Emperor (1638–1677)

- Đại Việt: Revival Lê dynasty (complete list) –

- Lê Kính Tông, Emperor (1600–1619)
- Lê Thần Tông, Emperor (1619–1643, 1649–1662)
- Lê Chân Tông, Emperor (1643–1649)
- Lê Huyền Tông, Emperor (1663–1671)
- Lê Gia Tông, Emperor (1672–1675)
- Lê Hy Tông, Emperor (1676–1704)

- Đàng Ngoài: Trịnh lords (complete list) –

- Trịnh Tùng, Lord (1570–1623)
- Trịnh Tráng, Lord (1623–1652)
- Trịnh Tạc, Lord (1653–1682)
- Trịnh Căn, Lord (1682–1709)

- Đàng Trong: Nguyễn lords (complete list) –

- Nguyễn Hoàng, Lord (1558–1613)
- Nguyễn Phúc Nguyên, Lord (1613–1635)
- Nguyễn Phúc Lan, Lord (1635–1648)
- Nguyễn Phúc Tần, Lord (1648–1687)
- Nguyễn Phúc Thái, Lord (1687–1691)
- Nguyễn Phúc Chu, Lord (1691–1725)

=== Asia: West ===
Iran

- Safavid Iran (complete list) –

- Abbas I, Shah (1587–1629)
- Safi, Shah (1629–1642)
- Abbas II, Shah (1642–1666)
- Suleiman I, Shah (1666–1694)
- Husayn, Sultan (1694–1722)

- Baban (complete list) –

- Faqi Ahmad, Prince (1649–1670)
- Sulaiman Baba, Prince (1670–1703)

Lebanon

- Emirate of Mount Lebanon (complete list) –

- Fakhr al-Din II, Emir (1591–1635)
- Mulhim Ma'n, Emir (1635–1658)
- Ahmad Ma'n, Emir (1658–1697)
- Bashir I Shihab, Emir (1697–1706)

Oman

- Imamate of Oman: Nabhani dynasty (complete list) –

- Abdulla bin Muhammad, Malik (1560–1624)

- Imamate of Oman: Yaruba dynasty (complete list) –

- Nasir bin Murshid, Imam (1624–1649)
- Sultan bin Saif, Imam (1649–1679), Portuguese protectorate ended with 1650
- Bil'arab bin Sultan, Imam (1679–1692)
- Saif bin Sultan, Imam (1692–1711)

Saudi Arabia

- Bani Khalid Emirate (complete list) –

- Barak bin Ghurair bin Masoud Al Hamid, Emir (1669–1682)
- Muhammad bin Ghurair, Emir (1682–1691)
- Sa'dun bin Muhammad, Emir (1691–1722)

Turkey

- Ottoman Empire

- Sultans –

- Mehmed III, Sultan (1595–1603)
- Ahmed I, Sultan (1603–1617)
- Mustafa I, Sultan (1617–1618, 1622–1623)
- Osman II, Sultan (1618–1622)
- Murad IV, Sultan (1623–1640)
- Ibrahim, Sultan (1640–1648)
- Mehmed IV, Sultan (1648–1687)
- Suleiman II, Sultan (1687–1691)
- Ahmed II, Sultan (1691–1695)
- Mustafa II, Sultan (1695–1703)

- Grand Viziers –

- Damat Ibrahim Pasha, Grand Vizier (1599–1601)
- Yemişçi Hasan Pasha, Grand Vizier (1601–1603)
- Yavuz Ali Pasha, Grand Vizier (1603–1604)
- Sokolluzade Lala Mehmed Pasha, Grand Vizier (1604–1606)
- Boşnak Derviş Mehmed Pasha, Grand Vizier (1606)
- Kuyucu Murad Pasha, Grand Vizier (1606–1611)
- Nasuh Pasha, Grand Vizier (1611–1614)
- Öküz Mehmed Pasha, Grand Vizier (1614–1616)
- Damat Halil Pasha, Grand Vizier (1616–1619)
- Öküz Mehmed Pasha, Grand Vizier (1619–1619)
- Güzelce Ali Pasha, Grand Vizier (1619–1621)
- Ohrili Hüseyin Pasha, Grand Vizier (1621)
- Dilaver Pasha, Grand Vizier (1621–1622)
- Kara Davud Pasha, Grand Vizier (1622)
- Mere Hüseyin Pasha, Grand Vizier (1622)
- Lefkeli Mustafa Pasha, Grand Vizier (1622)
- Gürcü Hadım Mehmed Pasha, Grand Vizier (1622–1623)
- Mere Hüseyin Pasha, Grand Vizier (1623)
- Kemankeş Kara Ali Pasha, Grand Vizier (1623–1624)
- Çerkes Mehmed Pasha, Grand Vizier (1624–1625)
- Filibeli Hafız Ahmed Pasha, Grand Vizier (1625–1626)
- Damat Halil Pasha, Grand Vizier (1626–1628)
- Gazi Ekrem Hüsrev Pasha, Grand Vizier (1628–1631)
- Hafiz Ahmed Pasha, Grand Vizier (1631–1632)
- Topal Recep Pasha, Grand Vizier (1632)
- Tabanıyassı Mehmed Pasha, Grand Vizier (1632–1637)
- Bayram Pasha, Grand Vizier (1637–1638)
- Tayyar Mehmed Pasha, Grand Vizier (1638)
- Kemankeş Mustafa Pasha, Grand Vizier (1638–1644)
- Sultanzade Mehmed Pasha, Grand Vizier (1644–1645)
- Nevesinli Salih Pasha, Grand Vizier (1645–1647)
- Kara Musa Pasha, Grand Vizier (1647)
- Hezarpare Ahmed Pasha, Grand Vizier (1647–1648)
- Sofu Mehmed Pasha, Grand Vizier (1648–1649)
- Kara Murat Pasha, Grand Vizier (1649–1650)
- Melek Ahmed Pasha, Grand Vizier (1650–1651)
- Abaza Siyavuş Pasha I, Grand Vizier (1651)
- Gürcü Mehmed Pasha, Grand Vizier (1651–1652)
- Tarhoncu Ahmed Pasha, Grand Vizier (1652–1653)
- Bıyıklı Koca Derviş Mehmed Pasha, Grand Vizier (1653–1654)
- Ibşir Mustafa Pasha, Grand Vizier (1654–1655)
- Kara Dev Murad Pasha, Grand Vizier (1655)
- Ermeni Süleyman Pasha, Grand Vizier (1655)
- Gazi Hüseyin Pasha, Grand Vizier (1656)
- Zurnazen Mustafa Pasha, Grand Vizier (1656)
- Abaza Siyavuş Pasha I, Grand Vizier (1656)
- Boynuyaralı Mehmed Pasha, Grand Vizier (1656)
- Köprülü Mehmed Pasha, Grand Vizier (1656–1661)
- Köprülü Fazıl Ahmed Pasha, Grand Vizier (1661–1676)
- Merzifonlu Kara Mustafa Pasha, Grand Vizier (1676–1683)
- Bayburtlu Kara Ibrahim Pasha, Grand Vizier (1683–1685)
- Sarı Süleyman Pasha, Grand Vizier (1685–1687)
- Abaza Siyavuş Pasha II, Grand Vizier (1687–1688)
- Ayaşlı Ismail Pasha, Grand Vizier (1688)
- Tekirdağlı Bekri Mustafa Pasha, Grand Vizier (1688–1689)
- Köprülü Fazıl Mustafa Pasha, Grand Vizier (1689–1691)
- Bahadırzade Arabacı Ali Pasha, Grand Vizier (1691–1692)
- Merzifonlu Çalık Hacı Ali Pasha, Grand Vizier (1692–1693)
- Bozoklu (Bıyıklı)Mustafa Pasha, Grand Vizier (1694)
- Sürmeli Ali Pasha, Grand Vizier (1694–1695)
- Elmas Mehmed Pasha, Grand Vizier (1695–1697)
- Amcazade Köprülü Hüseyin Pasha, Grand Vizier (1697–1702)

Yemen

- Wahidi Balhaf of Ba´l Haf (complete list) –

- Salih ibn Nasir al-Wahidi, Sultan (c.1640–1670)
- al-Hadi ibn Salih al-Wahidi, Sultan (c.1670–1706)

- Emirate of Beihan (complete list) –

- Muqbil, Amir (1680–?)
- Hasan, Amir (?)

- Kathiri (complete list) –

- Dscha'far ibn 'Abdallah al-Kathir, Sultan (1670–1690)
- Badr ibn Dscha'far al-Kathir, Sultan (1690–1707)

- Yemeni Zaidi State (complete list) –

- al-Mansur al-Qasim, Imam (1597–1620)
- al-Mu'ayyad Muhammad, Imam (1620–1640)
- al-Mutawakkil Isma'il, Imam (1640–1676)
- al-Mahdi Ahmad, Imam (1676–1681)
- al-Mu'ayyad Muhammad II, Imam (1681–1686)
- al-Mahdi Muhammad, Imam (1689–1718)

- Lower Yafa –

- Afif, ruler (1681–1700)
- Qahtan ibn Afif, ruler (1700–1720)

== Europe ==
=== Europe: Balkans ===
- Prince-Bishopric of Montenegro (complete list) –

- Ruvim II, Prince-bishop (1593–1636)
- Mardarije I, Prince-bishop (1639–1649)
- Visarion I, Prince-bishop (1649–1659)
- Mardarije II, Prince-bishop (1659–1673)
- Ruvim III, Prince-bishop (1673–1685)
- Vasilije II, Prince-bishop (1685)
- Visarion II, Prince-bishop (1685–1692)
- Sava Očinić, Prince-bishop (1694–1696)
- Danilo I, Prince-bishop (1696–1735)

Croatia

- Kingdom of Croatia (Habsburg)

- Kings (complete list) –
part of the Habsburg monarchy, also part of the Lands of the Hungarian Crown

House of Habsburg
- Rudolph, King (1576–1608)
- Matthias II, King (1608–1619)
- Ferdinand II, King (1619–1637)
- Ferdinand III, King (1637–1657)
- Ferdinand IV, King (1647–1654)
- Leopold I, King (1657–1705)

- Bans (complete list) –

- Peter Zrinski, Ban (1665–1670)
- Miklós Erdődy, Ban (1670–1693)
- Adam II. Batthyány, Ban (1693–1703)

- Republic of Ragusa (complete list) –

- Antun Orsata Gondole, Rector (1601)
- Sabo Menze, Rector (1602)
- Marin Tudisi, Rector (1603)
- Frano Caboga, Rector (1611)
- Vlaho Gondola, Rector (1612)
- Marin Sorgo, Rector (1614)
- Stijepo Prodanello, Rector (1615)
- Stijepo Proculo, Rector (1616)
- Lamprica Cerva, Rector (1617)
- Jero Bona, Rector (1618)
- Niko Gozze, Rector (1619)
- Frano Sorgo, Rector (1620)
- Tomo Basilio, Rector (1621)
- Đivo Menze, Rector (1622)
- Đivo Clasci, Rector (1623)
- Frano Nika Sorga, Rector (1624)
- Pijero Cerva, Rector (1627)
- Pijero Cerva, Rector (1628)
- Pavo Pozza, Rector (1629)
- Jero Gozze, Marin Menze, Rector (1630)
- Đivo Nika Gondole, Rector (1631)
- Simo Menze, Rector (1639)
- Pavo Pozza, Rector (1640)
- Džono Resti, Rector (1641)
- Luko Andra Sorga, Rector (1642)
- Pavo Pozza, Rector (1643)
- Luco Caboga, Rector (1651)
- Luko Sorgo, Rector (1652)
- Sabo Bona, Rector (1653)
- Frano Ghetaldi, Rector (1654)
- Marin Proculo, Rector (1655)
- Ivan Bunić Vučić, Marko Pozza, Rector (?–1658)
- Cerva, Rector (1659–?)
- Luko Gozze, Rector (1660–?)
- Marin Proculo, Rector (1661)
- Frano Šiška Sorga, Rector (1662)
- Beno Bona, Rector (1663)
- Simo Menze, Rector (1664)
- Luko Resti, Rector (1665)
- Simo Ghetaldi, Miho Menze, Rector (1667–?)
- Marin Sorgo, Rector (1670)
- Đivo Mata Ghetaldi, Rector (1671)
- Jero Menze, Rector (1672)
- Kliment Menze, Rector (1680)
- Mato Bunić, Rector (1681)
- Niko Binčulić, Rector (1682)
- Klement Menze, Rector (1683)
- Stijepo Tudisi, Šišmundo Gundulić, Rector (?–1684)
- Mato Gondola, Rector (?-?)
- Lovrijenac Sorgo, Rector (1692)
- Rafo Gozze, Rector (1693)
- Đivo Karla Sorga, Rector (1694)
- Jero Menze, Rector (1695)
- Dominko Bucchia, Rector (1696)
- Đivo Šiška Gondole, Vlađ Bona, Rector (1699)
- Vlaho Cerva, Rector (1700)

=== Europe: British Isles ===
- Kingdom of England, Kingdom of Scotland, Kingdom of Ireland (complete list, complete list) –

- Elizabeth I, Queen of England and Ireland (1558–1603)
- James VI and I, King of Scotland (1567–1625), King of England and Ireland (1603–1625)
- Charles I, King (1625–1649)

- Commonwealth of England –

- English Council of State, (1649–1653, 1659–1660)

- The Protectorate: Commonwealth of England, Scotland, and Ireland (complete list) –

- Oliver Cromwell, Lord Protector (1653–1658)
- Richard Cromwell, Lord Protector (1658–1659)

- Kingdom of England, Kingdom of Scotland, Kingdom of Ireland (complete list, complete list) –

- Charles II, King of Scotland (1649–1651, 1660–1685), King of England and Ireland (1660–1685)
- James II & VII, King (1685–1688)
- Mary II, Queen co-regnant (1689–1694) and William III & II, King co-regnant (1689–1702)

Ireland

- East Breifne (complete list) –

- Edmond, ruler (1596–1601)
- Owen, ruler (1601–1609)

- West Breifne (complete list) –

- Tadhg Ó Ruairc, Lord (1600–1605)

- Leinster (complete list) –

- Domhnall Spáinneach mac Murchadha Caomhánach, King (1582–1603)

- Síol Anmchadha (complete list) –

- Domhnall Ó Madadhan, Lord (1567–1612)
- Anmchadh Ó Madadhan, Lord (1612–1636)

=== Europe: Central ===
- Holy Roman Empire, Kingdom of Germany

- Emperors Elect, Kings –

- Rudolph II, Emperor Elect (1576–1612), King (1575–1612)
- Matthias, Emperor Elect (1612–1619), King (1612–1618)
- Ferdinand II, Emperor Elect (1619–1637), King (1618–1637)
- Ferdinand III, Emperor Elect (1637–1657), King (1636–1657)
- Ferdinand IV, co-King (1653–1654)
- Leopold I, Emperor Elect, King (1658–1705)

- Reichsvizekanzler: Vice Chancellor –

- Rudolf Coraduz von und zu Nußdorf, Vice Chancellor (1597–1606)
- Leopold von Stralendorf, Vice Chancellor (1606–1612)
- Hans Ludwig von Ulm, Vice Chancellor (1612–1627)
- Peter Heinrich von Stralendorf, Vice Chancellor (1627–1637)
- Ferdinand Sigismund Graf Kurtz von Senftenau, Vice Chancellor (1637–1659)
- Wilderich von Walderdorff, Vice Chancellor (1660–1669)
- Leopold Wilhelm Graf von Königsegg-Rothenfels, Vice Chancellor (1669–1694)
- Gottlieb Amadeus Graf von Windisch-Graetz, Vice Chancellor (1694–1695)
- Dominik Andreas I. von Kaunitz, Vice Chancellor (1698–1705)

Austria

- Habsburg monarchy (complete list) –

Habsburg monarchs ruled under numerous simultaneous titles

- Rudolf II, (1576–1612)
- Matthias, (1612–1619)
- Ferdinand II, (1619–1637)
- Ferdinand III, (1637–1657)
- Leopold I, (1657–1705)

Hungary

- Kingdom of Hungary (1526–1867) (complete list) –

- Rudolph, King (1576–1608)
- Matthias II, King (1608–1619)
- Ferdinand II, King (1619–1637)
- Ferdinand III, King (1637–1657)
- Ferdinand IV, King (1647–1654)
- Leopold I, King (1657–1705)

Poland

- Polish–Lithuanian Commonwealth: Kingdom of Poland (complete list) –

- Sigismund III Vasa, King and Grand Duke (1587–1632)
- Władysław IV Vasa, King and Grand Duke (1632–1648)
- John II Casimir Vasa, King and Grand Duke (1648–1668)
- Michał Korybut Wiśniowiecki, King and Grand Duke (1669–1673)
- John III Sobieski, King and Grand Duke (1674–1696)
- Augustus II the Strong, King and Grand Duke (1697–1706, 1709–1733)

- Duchy of Prussia (complete list) –

- Albert Frederick, Duke (1568–1618)
- John Sigismund, Duke (1618–1619)
- George William, Duke (1619–1640)
- Frederick William, Duke (1640–1688)
- Frederick I, Duke (1688–1701), King (1701–1713)

=== Europe: East ===
- Crimean Khanate (complete list) –

- Ğazı II Giray, Khan (1596–1607)
- Toqtamış Giray, Khan (1607–1608)
- Selâmet I Giray, Khan (1608–1610)
- Canibek Giray, Khan (1610–1623)
- Mehmed III Giray, Khan (1623–1628)
- Canibek Giray, Khan (1628–1635)
- İnayet Giray, Khan (1635–1637)
- Bahadır I Giray, Khan (1637–1641)
- Mehmed IV Giray, Khan (1641–1644)
- İslâm III Giray, Khan (1644–1654)
- Mehmed IV Giray, Khan (1654–1666)
- Adil Giray, Khan (1666–1671)
- Selim I Giray, Khan (1671–1678)
- Murad Giray, Khan (1678–1683)
- Haci II Giray, Khan (1683–1684)
- Selim I Giray, Khan (1684–1691)
- Saadet III Giray, Khan (1691)
- Safa Giray, Khan (1691–1692)
- Selim I Giray, Khan (1692–1699)
- Devlet II Giray, Khan (1699–1702)

- Polish–Lithuanian Commonwealth: Grand Duchy of Lithuania (complete list) –

- Sigismund III Vasa, King and Grand Duke (1587–1632)
- Władysław IV Vasa, King and Grand Duke (1632–1648)
- John II Casimir Vasa, King and Grand Duke (1648–1668)
- Michał Korybut Wiśniowiecki, King and Grand Duke (1669–1673)
- John III Sobieski, King and Grand Duke (1674–1696)
- Augustus II the Strong, King and Grand Duke (1697–1706, 1709–1733)

- Ukraine: Cossack Hetmanate

List of rulers of Cossack Hetmanate (1648-1764)

- Bohdan Khmelnytsky, Hetman (1648-1657)
- Yuriy Khmelnytsky, Hetman, Hetman of Right-bank Ukraine (1657, 1659-1663, 1677-1681)
- Ivan Vyhovsky, Hetman (1657-1659)
- Pavlo Teteria, Hetman of Right-bank Ukraine (1663-1665)
- Ivan Briukhovetsky, Hetman of Left-bank Ukraine (1663-1668)
- Petro Doroshenko, Hetman of Right-bank Ukraine (1665-1676)
- Demian Mnohohrishny, Hetman of Left-bank Ukraine (1668-1672)
- Ivan Samoylovych, Hetman of Left-bank Ukraine (1672-1687)
- Ivan Mazepa, Hetman of Left-bank Ukraine, Hetman of allied Hetmanate, Prince of Holy Roman Empire (1687-1704, 1704-1709, 1707-1709)
- Ivan Skoropadsky, Hetman of Left-Bank Ukraine (1708-1722)
- Pylyp Orlyk, Hetman in exile (1710-1742)

- Moldavia (complete list) –

- Ieremia Movilă, Voivode (1595–1600, 1600–1606)
- Simion Movilă, Voivode (1606–1607)
- Mihail II Movilă, Voivode (1607, 1607)
- Constantin I Movilă, Voivode (1607, 1607–1611)
- Ștefan IX Tomșa, Voivode (1611–1615, 1621–1623)
- Alexandru VI Movilă, Voivode (1615–1616)
- Radu Mihnea, Voivode (1616–1619, 1623–1626)
- Gaspar Graziani, Voivode (1619–1620)
- Alexandru VII Iliaş, Voivode (1620–1621, 1631–1633)
- Miron Barnovschi-Movilă, Voivode (1626–1629, 1633)
- Alexandru VIII Coconul, Voivode (1626–1629)
- Moise Movilă, Voivode (1630–1631, 1633–1634)
- Vasile Lupu, Voivode (1634–1653, 1653)
- Gheorghe II Ștefan, Voivode (1653, 1653–1658)
- Gheorghe III Ghica, Voivode (1658–1659)
- Constantin Șerban, Voivode (1659, 1661)
- Ștefan X Lupu, Voivode (1659–1661, 1661)
- Eustratie Dabija, Voivode (1661–1665)
- Gheorghe IV Duca, Voivode (1665–1666, 1668–1672, 1678–1683)
- Iliaș III Alexandru, Voivode (1666–1668)
- Ștefan XI Petriceicu, Voivode (1672–1673, 1673–1674, 1683–1684)
- Dumitrașcu Cantacuzino, Voivode (1673, 1674–1675, 1684–1685)
- Antonie Ruset, Voivode (1675–1678)
- Constantin Cantemir, Voivode (1685–1693)
- Dimitrie Cantemir, Voivode (1693, 1710–1711)
- Constantin Duca, Voivode (1693–1695, 1700–1703)
- Antioh Cantemir, Prince (1695–1700, 1705–1707)

- Qasim Khanate (complete list) –

- Eid al-Muhammad, Khan (1600–1610)
- Arslanghali, Khan (1614–1627)
- Sayed Borhan, Sultan (1627–1679)
- Fatima Soltan, Khanum (1679–1681)

- Tsardom of Russia (complete list) –

- Boris Godunov, Tsar (1598–1605)
- Feodor II, Tsar (1605)
- Dmitriy I, Tsar (1605–1606)
- Vasili IV, Tsar (1606–1610)
- Vladislav I, Tsar (1610–1612)
- Michael I, Tsar (1613–1645)
- Alexis, Tsar (1645–1676)
- Feodor III, Tsar (1676–1682)
- Peter I, Tsar (1682–1721), Emperor (1721–1725)
- Ivan V, co-Tsar (1682–1696)

- Principality of Transylvania (1570–1711) (complete list) –

- Giorgio Basta, commissioner (1600–1601, 1601–1603)
- Sigismund Báthory, Prince (1586–1598, 1598–1599, 1601–1602)
- Moses Székely, Prince (1603)
- Radu Șerban, Voivode (1603), Prince (July 1603–September 1603
- Giorgio Basta, commissioner (1603–1604)
- Stephen Bocskai, Prince (1605–1606)
- Sigismund Rákóczi, Prince (1607–1608)
- Gabriel Báthory, Prince (1608–1613)
- Gabriel Bethlen, Prince (1613–1629)
- Catherine of Brandenburg, Princess (1629–1630)
- Stephen Bethlen, Prince (1630)
- George I Rákóczi, Prince (1630–1648)
- George II Rákóczi, Prince (1648–1657, 1658, 1659–1660)
- Francis I Rákóczi, Prince (not installed)
- Francis Rhédey, Prince (1657–1658)
- Ákos Barcsay, Prince (1658–1659, 1660)
- John Kemény, Prince (1661–1662)
- Michael I Apafi, Prince (1661–1690)
- Emeric Thököly, Prince (1690)
- Michael II Apafi, Prince (1690–1696/1701)
- Francis II Rákóczi, Prince (1704–1711)

- Principality of Wallachia (complete list) –

- Simion Movilă, Prince (1600–1601, 1602)
- Radu IX Mihnea, Prince (1601–1602, 1611, 1611–1616, 1620–1623)
- Radu X Șerban, Prince (1602–1610, 1611)
- Transylvanian occupation: direct rule of Gabriel Báthory (1611)
- Gabriel Movilă, Prince (1616, 1618–1620)
- Alexandru IV Iliaș, Prince (1616–1618, 1627–1629)
- Alexandru V Coconul, Prince (1623–1627)
- Leon Tomșa, Prince (1629–1632)
- Radu XI Iliaș, Prince (1632)
- Matei Basarab, Prince (1632–1654)
- Constantin I Șerban, Prince (1654–1658)
- Mihnea III, Prince (1658–1659)
- Gheorghe I Ghica, Prince (1659–1660)
- Grigore I Ghica, Prince (1660–1664, 1672–1673)
- Radu XII Leon, Prince (1664–1669)
- Antonie Vodă din Popeşti, Prince (1669–1672)
- Gheorghe II Ducas, Prince (1673–1678)
- Șerban Cantacuzino, Prince (1678–1688)
- Constantin II Brâncoveanu, Prince (1688–1714)

=== Europe: Nordic ===
Denmark–Norway

- Denmark–Norway (complete list / complete list) –

- Christian IV, King (1588–1648)
- Frederick III, King (1648–1670)
- Christian V, King (1670–1699)
- Frederick IV, King (1699–1730)

- Duchy of Schleswig (complete list) –

- Christian IV of Denmark, Duke (1588–1648)
- John Adolf, Duke of Holstein-Gottorp, Duke (1590–1616)
- Frederick III, Duke of Holstein-Gottorp, Duke (1616–1659)
- Frederick III of Denmark, Duke (1648–1670)
- Christian Albert, Duke of Holstein-Gottorp, Duke (1659–1695)
- Christian V of Denmark, Duke (1670–1699)
- Frederick IV, Duke of Holstein-Gottorp, Duke (1695–1702)

Sweden

- History of Sweden (1523–1611) (complete list) –

- Charles IX, Regent (1599–1604), King (1604–1611)

- Swedish Empire (complete list) –

- Gustavus Adolphus, King (1611–1632)
- Christina, Queen (1632–1654)
- Charles X Gustav, King (1654–1660)
- Charles XI, King (1660–1697)
- Charles XII, King (1697–1718)

=== Europe: Southcentral ===
- Duchy of Mantua (complete list) –

- Vincenzo, Duke (1587–1612)
- Francesco IV, Duke (1612)
- Ferdinando, Duke (1612–1626)
- Vincenzo II, Duke (1626–1627)
- Charles I, Duke (1627–1637)
- Charles II, Duke (1637–1665)
- Ferdinando Carlo, Duke (1665–1708)

- Principality of Massa and Margraviate of Carrara (complete list) –

- Alberico I Cybo-Malaspina, Marquis (1554–1623), Prince and Marquis (1558–1623)
- Carlo I Cybo-Malaspina, Prince and Marquis (1623–1662)
- Alberico II Cybo-Malaspina, Prince and Marquis (1662–1690)

- Duchy of Massa and Principality of Carrara (complete list) –

- Alberico II Cybo-Malaspina, Prince and Marquis (1662–1664), Duke and Prince (1664–1690)
- Carlo II Cybo-Malaspina, Duke and Prince (1690–1710)

- Duchy of Montferrat (complete list) –

- Vincent I, Duke (1587–1612)
- Francis II, Duke (1612)
- Ferdinand, Duke (1612–26)
- Vincent II, Duke (1626–27)
- War of the Mantuan Succession, ruler (1627–1631)
- Maria, Duchess (1612–1661)
- Charles I, Duke (1627–1637)
- Charles II, ruler (1637–1665)
- Ferdinand Charles, Duke (1665–1708)

- Papal States (complete list) –

- Clement VIII, Pope (1592–1605)
- Leo XI, Pope (1605)
- Paul V, Pope (1605–1621)
- Gregory XV, Pope (1621–1623)
- Urban VIII, Pope (1623–1644)
- Innocent X, Pope (1644–1655)
- Alexander VII, Pope (1655–1667)
- Clement IX, Pope (1667–1669)
- Clement X, Pope (1670–1676)
- Innocent XI, Pope (1676–1689)
- Alexander VIII, Pope (1689–1691)
- Innocent XII, Pope (1691–1700)
- Clement XI, Pope (1700–1721)

- Duchy of Parma (complete list) –

- Ranuccio I, Duke (1592–1622)
- Odoardo, Duke (1622–1646)
- Ranuccio II, Duke (1646–1694)
- Francesco, Duke (1694–1727)

- San Marino

- Captains Regent (1500–1700) –

- Pier Matteo Belluzzi, Fabrizio Belluzzi, Captains Regent (1600–1601)
- Lorenzo Martelli, Liberio Gabrielli, Captains Regent (1601)
- Girolamo Gozi, Francesco Giannini, Captains Regent (1601–1602)
- Giuliano Gozi, Innocenzo Bonelli, Captains Regent (1602)
- Giambattista Belluzzi, Francesco Maria Corbelli, Captains Regent (1602–1603)
- Orazio Belluzzi, Scipione Gabrielli, Captains Regent (1603)
- Francesco Bonelli, Lattanzio Valli, Captains Regent (1603–1604)
- Pier Francesco Bonetti, Giambattista Fabbri, Captains Regent (1604)
- Pier Marino Cionini, Annibale Gozi, Captains Regent (1604–1605)
- Tiberio Gabrielli, Francesco Giannini, Captains Regent (1605)
- Girolamo Gozi, Innocenzo Bonelli, Captains Regent (1605–1606)
- Pier Matteo Belluzzi, Fabrizio Belluzzi, Captains Regent (1606)
- Annibale Belluzzi, Giuliano Fattori, Captains Regent (1606–1607)
- Lorenzo Martelli, Leone Pellicieri, Captains Regent (1607)
- Camillo Bonelli, Giambattista Belluzzi, Captains Regent (1607–1608)
- Pier Francesco Bonelli, Giuliano Belluzzi, Captains Regent (1608)
- Pietro Tosini Corbelli, Teodoro Leonardelli, Captains Regent (1608–1609)
- Orazio Belluzzi, Orazio Giangi, Captains Regent (1609)
- Girolamo Gozi, Lattanzio Valli, Captains Regent (1609–1610)
- Fabrizio Belluzzi, Giambattista Fabbri, Captains Regent (1610)
- Gio. Andrea Belluzzi, Sebastiano Onofri, Captains Regent (1610–1611)
- Pier Marino Cionini, Annibale Gozi, Captains Regent (1611)
- Francesco Bonelli, Belluzzo Belluzzi, Captains Regent (1611–1612)
- Pier Francesco Bonetti, Francesco Maria Corbelli, Captains Regent (1612)
- Pietro Tosini Corbelli, Innocenzo Bonelli, Captains Regent (1612–1613)
- Camillo Bonelli, Lattanzio Valli, Captains Regent (1613)
- Annibale Belluzzi, Giambattista Fabbri, Captains Regent (1613–1614)
- Gio. Andrea Belluzzi, Fabrizio Belluzzi, Captains Regent (1614)
- Giuliano Belluzzi, Teodoro Leonardelli, Captains Regent (1614–1615)
- Girolamo Gozi, Francesco Giannini, Captains Regent (1615)
- Orazio Belluzzi, Flaminio Cionini, Captains Regent (1615–1616)
- Pier Francesco Bonetti, Francesco Bonelli, Captains Regent (1616)
- Camillo Bonelli, Belluzzo Belluzzi, Captains Regent (1616–1617)
- Annibale Belluzzi, Giambattista Fabbri, Captains Regent (1617)
- Gio. Andrea Belluzzi, Lattanzio Valli, Captains Regent (1617–1618)
- Fabrizio Belluzzi, Gabriele Gabrielli, Captains Regent (1618)
- Girolamo Gozi, Gio. Pietro Martelli, Captains Regent (1618–1619)
- Francesco Giannini, Annibale Gozi, Captains Regent (1619)
- Orazio Belluzzi, Andrea Giannini, Captains Regent (1619–1620)
- Giuliano Belluzzi, Teodoro Leonardelli, Captains Regent (1620)
- Camillo Bonelli, Belluzzo Belluzzi, Captains Regent (1620–1621)
- Bernardino Belluzzi, Lattanzio Valli, Captains Regent (1621)
- Gio. Andrea Belluzzi, Fabrizio Belluzzi, Captains Regent (1621–1622)
- Girolamo Gozi, Pier Marino Ricci, Captains Regent (1622)
- Annibale Belluzzi, Marino Belluzzi, Captains Regent (1622–1623)
- Giacomo Bonetti, Annibale Gozi, Captains Regent (1623)
- Giuliano Belluzzi, Enea Bonelli, Captains Regent (1623–1624)
- Pietro Tosini Corbelli, Gian Giacomo Serafini, Captains Regent (1624)
- Lattanzio Valli, Michel Angelo Busignani, Captains Regent (1624–1625)
- Orazio Belluzzi, Pier Leone Corbelli, Captains Regent (1625)
- Camillo Bonelli, Giambattista Fabbri, Captains Regent (1625–1626)
- Francesco Giannini, Livio Pellicieri, Captains Regent (1626)
- Belluzzo Belluzzi, Pier Marino Ricci, Captains Regent (1626–1627)
- Annibale Loli, Pier Antonio Gabrielli, Captains Regent (1627)
- Pietro Tosini Corbelli, Andrea Giannini, Captains Regent (1627–1628)
- Lattanzio Valli, Sforza Cionini, Captains Regent (1628)
- Giuliano Belluzzi, Michel Angelo Busignani, Captains Regent (1628–1629)
- Marc'Antonio Bonetti, Gian Giacomo Serafini, Captains Regent (1629)
- Orazio Belluzzi, Federico Gozi, Captains Regent (1629–1630)
- Livio Pellicieri, Pier Marino Ricci, Captains Regent (1630)
- Belluzzo Belluzzi, Rinaldo Ranieri, Captains Regent (1630–1631)
- Melchiorre Maggio Belluzzi, Pier Antonio Giangi, Captains Regent (1631)
- Fulgenzio Maccioni, Vincenzo Zampini, Captains Regent (1631–1632)
- Pietro Tosini, Evangelista Belluzzi, Captains Regent (1632)
- Giuliano Belluzzi, Sforza Cionini, Captains Regent (1632–1633)
- Marc'Antonio Bonetti, Bartolomeo Ceccoli, Captains Regent (1633)
- Torquato Giannini, Bartolomeo Fabbri, Captains Regent (1633–1634)
- Lattanzio Valli, Federico Gozi, Captains Regent (1634)
- Orazio Belluzzi, Vincenzo Lorenzoni, Captains Regent (1634–1635)
- Livio Pellicieri, Paolo Antonio Onofri, Captains Regent (1635)
- Giuliano Gozi, Stefano Ricci, Captains Regent (1635–1636)
- Fulgenzio Maccioni, Giuliano Belluzzi, Captains Regent (1636)
- Marc'Antonio Bonetti, Bartolomeo Ceccoli, Captains Regent (1636–1637)
- Pietro Tosini, Giambattista Loli, Captains Regent (1637)
- Melchiorre Maggio Belluzzi, Giovanni Serafini, Captains Regent (1637–1638)
- Claudio Belluzzi, Pier Leone Corbelli, Captains Regent (1638)
- Livio Pellicieri, Federico Tosini, Captains Regent (1638–1639)
- Vincenzo Lorenzoni, Paolo Antonio Onofri, Captains Regent (1639)
- Fulgenzio Maccioni, Annibale Loli, Captains Regent (1639–1640)
- Marc'Antonio Bonetti, Giuliano Belluzzi, Captains Regent (1640)
- Giambattista Belluzzi, Federico Gozi, Captains Regent (1640–1641)
- Giambattista Ricci, Pier Antonio Giangi, Captains Regent (1641)
- Sforza Cionini, Bartolomeo Ceccoli, Captains Regent (1641–1642)
- Giacomo Belluzzi, Giovanni Serafini, Captains Regent (1642)
- Claudio Belluzzi, Paolo Antonio Onofri, Captains Regent (1642–1643)
- Fulgenzio Maccioni, Federico Tosini, Captains Regent (1643)
- Melchiorre Maggio Belluzzi, Evangelista Belluzzi, Captains Regent (1643–1644)
- Livio Pellicieri, Gregorio Ceccoli, Captains Regent (1644)
- Giuliano Belluzzi, Pier Leone Corbelli, Captains Regent (1644–1645)
- Sforza Cionini, Vincenzo Francini, Captains Regent (1645)
- Marc'Antonio Bonetti, Ottavio Giannini, Captains Regent (1645–1646)
- Carlo Loli, Vincenzo Lorenzoni, Captains Regent (1646)
- Claudio Belluzzi, Paolo Antonio Onofri, Captains Regent (1646–1647)
- Carlo Tosini, Pier Marino Cionini, Captains Regent (1647)
- Bartolomeo Belluzzi, Marino Gabrielli, Captains Regent (1647–1648)
- Giacomo Belluzzi, Giovanni Serafini, Captains Regent (1648)
- Giuliano Gozi, Pier Leone Corbelli, Captains Regent (1648–1649)
- Marc'Antonio Bonetti, Innocenzo Bonelli, Captains Regent (1649)
- Fulgenzio Maccioni, Federico Tosini, Captains Regent (1649–1650)
- Melchiorre Maggio Belluzzi, Girolamo Moracci, Captains Regent (1650)
- Carlo Tosini, Paolo Antonio Onofri, Captains Regent (1650–1651)
- Alessandro Belluzzi, Vincenzo Lorenzoni, Captains Regent (1651)
- Carlo Loli, Gregorio Ceccoli, Captains Regent (1651–1652)
- Ottavio Giannini, Bartolomeo Ceccoli, Captains Regent (1652)
- Giacomo Belluzzi, Innocenzo Bonelli, Captains Regent (1652–1653)
- Lodovico Belluzzi, Giovanni Serafini, Captains Regent (1653)
- Marc'Antonio Bonetti, Pompeo Zoli, Captains Regent (1653–1654)
- Fulgenzio Maccioni, Cristofaro Gianotti, Captains Regent (1654)
- Carlo Tosini, Paolo Antonio Onofri, Captains Regent (1654–1655)
- Carlo Loli, Sforza Cionini, Captains Regent (1655)
- Ottavio Giannini, Bartolomeo Ceccoli, Captains Regent (1655–1656)
- Melchiorre Maggio Belluzzi, Vincenzo Lorenzoni, Captains Regent (1656)
- Alessandro Belluzzi, Giovanni Serafini, Captains Regent (1656–1657)
- Innocenzo Bonelli, Girolamo Moracci, Captains Regent (1657)
- Giacomo Belluzzi, Pier Leone Corbelli, Captains Regent (1657–1658)
- Fulgenzio Maccioni, Marino Bonetti, Captains Regent (1658)
- Carlo Loli, Pompeo Zoli, Captains Regent (1658–1659)
- Ottavio Giannini, Cristofaro Gianotti, Captains Regent (1659)
- Paolo Antonio Onofri, Antonio Ricci, Captains Regent (1659–1660)
- Francesco Angeli, Vincenzo Lorenzoni, Giovanni Serafini, Captains Regent (1660)
- Alessandro Belluzzi, Giambattista Zampini, Captains Regent (1660–1661)
- Giacomo Belluzzi, Sforza Cionini, Captains Regent (1661)
- Carlo Tosini, Innocenzo Bonelli, Captains Regent (1661–1662)
- Fulgenzio Maccioni, Girolamo Moracci, Captains Regent (1662)
- Lodovico Belluzzi, Pompeo Zoli, Captains Regent (1662–1663)
- Melchiorre Maggio Belluzzi, Paolo Antonio Onofri, Captains Regent (1663)
- Marc'Antonio Gozi, Cristoforo Gianotti, Captains Regent (1663–1664)
- Carlo Loli, Vincenzo Lorenzoni, Captains Regent (1664)
- Francesco Maccioni, Giovanni Serafini, Captains Regent (1664–1665)
- Ottavio Giannini, Francesco Angeli, Captains Regent (1665)
- Carlo Tosini, Sforza Cionini, Captains Regent (1665–1666)
- Giacomo Belluzzi, Giambattista Tosini, Captains Regent (1666)
- Alessandro Belluzzi, Pompeo Zoli, Captains Regent (1666–1667)
- Lodovico Belluzzi, Innocenzo Bonelli, Captains Regent (1667)
- Paolo Antonio Onofri, Domizio Beni, Captains Regent (1667–1668)
- Carlo Loli, Giambattista Zampini, Captains Regent (1668)
- Francesco Maccioni, Francesco Loli, Captains Regent (1668–1669)
- Ottavio Giannini, Francesco Angeli, Captains Regent (1669)
- Giacomo Belluzzi, Giambattista Tosini, Captains Regent (1669–1670)
- Marc'Antonio Gozi, Marc'Antonio Ceccoli, Captains Regent (1670)
- Lodovico Belluzzi, Innocenzo Bonelli, Captains Regent (1670–1671)
- Paolo Antonio Onofri, Pompeo Zoli, Captains Regent (1671)
- Carlo Tosini, Giovanni Serafini, Captains Regent (1671–1672)
- Carlo Loli, Giambattista Zampini, Captains Regent (1672)
- Alessandro Belluzzi, Sforza Cionini, Captains Regent (1672–1673)
- Ottavio Giannini, Alfonso Tosini, Captains Regent (1673)
- Giambattista Tosini, Francesco Angeli, Captains Regent (1673–1674)
- Francesco Maccioni, Francesco Loli, Captains Regent (1674)
- Marc'Antonio Gozi, Innocenzo Bonelli, Captains Regent (1674–1675)
- Paolo Antonio Onofri, Giovanni Serafini, Captains Regent (1675)
- Carlo Tosini, Lorenzo Giangi, Captains Regent (1675–1676)
- Giuliano Cionini, Pompeo Zoli, Captains Regent (1676)
- Lodovico Belluzzi, Giambattista Zampini, Captains Regent (1676–1677)
- Giambattista Tosini, Francesco Angeli, Captains Regent (1677)
- Carlo Loli, Marc'Antonio Ceccoli, Captains Regent (1677–1678)
- Marc'Antonio Gozi, Innocenzo Bonelli, Captains Regent (1678)
- Ottavio Giannini, Alfonso Tosini, Captains Regent (1678–1679)
- Francesco Maccioni, Francesco Loli, Captains Regent (1679)
- Carlo Tosini, Lorenzo Giangi, Captains Regent (1679–1680)
- Alessandro Belluzzi, Giambattista Fattori, Captains Regent (1680)
- Giambattista Tosini, Melchiorre Martelli, Captains Regent (1680–1681)
- Giacomo Belluzzi, Giovanni Serafini, Captains Regent (1681)
- Paolo Antonio Onofri, Francesco Angeli, Captains Regent (1681–1682)
- Carlo Loli, Gaspare Calbini, Captains Regent (1682)
- Marc'Antonio Gozi, Innocenzo Bonelli, Captains Regent (1682–1683)
- Francesco Maccioni, Alfonso Tosini, Captains Regent (1683)
- Carlo Tosini, Lorenzo Giangi, Captains Regent (1683–1684)
- Giuliano Belluzzi, Giambattista Fattori, Captains Regent (1684)
- Francesco Loli, Pietro Francini, Captains Regent (1684–1685)
- Ottavio Leonardelli, Melchiorre Martelli, Captains Regent (1685)
- Paolo Antonio Onofri, Ridolfo Zoli, Captains Regent (1685–1686)
- Carlo Loli, Gaspare Calbini, Captains Regent (1686)
- Gio. Antonio Belluzzi, Alfonso Tosini, Captains Regent (1686–1687)
- Alessandro Belluzzi, Marc'Antonio Ceccoli, Captains Regent (1687)
- Giuliano Belluzzi, Giambattista Fattori, Captains Regent (1687–1688)
- Innocenzo Bonelli, Francesco Angeli, Captains Regent (1688)
- Francesco Maccioni, Pietro Francini, Captains Regent (1688–1689)
- Francesco Loli, Matteo Martelli, Captains Regent (1689)
- Carlo Loli, Gaspare Calbini, Captains Regent (1689–1690)
- Gio. Antonio Belluzzi, Melchiorre Martelli, Captains Regent (1690)
- Ottavio Leonardelli, Lorenzo Giangi, Captains Regent (1690–1691)
- Alfonso Tosini, Baldassarre Tini, Captains Regent (1691)
- Lodovico Manenti Belluzzi, Marino Beni, Captains Regent (1691–1692)
- Francesco Maccioni, Gio. Antonio Fattori, Captains Regent (1692)
- Innocenzo Bonelli, Pietro Francini, Captains Regent (1692–1693)
- Francesco Loli, Matteo Martelli, Captains Regent (1693)
- Giuliano Belluzzi, Melchiorre Martelli, Captains Regent (1693–1694)
- Giuseppe Loli, Gaspare Calbini, Captains Regent (1694)
- Bernardino Leonardelli, Lorenzo Giangi, Captains Regent (1694–1695)
- Onofrio Onofri, Francesco Angeli, Captains Regent (1695)
- Lodovico Manenti Belluzzi, Marc'Antonio Ceccoli, Captains Regent (1695–1696)
- Francesco Maccioni, Gio. Antonio Fattori, Captains Regent (1696)
- Gio. Antonio Belluzzi, Ottavio Leonardelli, Captains Regent (1696–1697)
- Giambattista Tosini, Marino Beni, Captains Regent (1697)
- Giuliano Belluzzi, Melchiorre Martelli, Captains Regent (1697–1698)
- Innocenzo Bonelli, Lorenzo Giangi, Captains Regent (1698)
- Onofrio Onofri, Giambattista Ceccoli, Captains Regent (1698–1699)
- Bernardino Leonardelli, Pietro Arancini, Captains Regent (1699)
- Francesco Maccioni, Giovanni Antonio Fattori, Captains Regent (1699–1700)
- Francesco Loli, Baldassarre Tini, Captains Regent (1700)
- Ottavio Leonardelli, Marino Beni, Captains Regent (1700–1701)

- Grand Duchy of Tuscany (complete list) –

- Ferdinando I, Grand Duke (1587–1609)
- Cosimo II, Grand Duke (1609–1621)
- Ferdinando II, Grand Duke (1621–1670)
- Cosimo III, Grand Duke (1670–1723)

- Republic of Venice (complete list) –

- Marino Grimani, Doge (1595–1606)
- Leonardo Donato, Doge (1606–1612)
- Marcantonio Memmo, Doge (1612–1615)
- Giovanni Bembo, Doge (1615–1618)
- Nicolò Donato, Doge (1618–1618)
- Antonio Priuli, Doge (1618–1623)
- Francesco Contarini, Doge (1623–1624)
- Giovanni I Cornaro, Doge (1624–1630)
- Nicolò Contarini, Doge (1630–1631)
- Francesco Erizzo, Doge (1631–1646)
- Francesco Molin, Doge (1646–1655)
- Carlo Contarini, Doge (1655–1656)
- Francesco Cornaro, Doge (1656–1656)
- Bertuccio Valiero, Doge (1656–1658)
- Giovanni Pesaro, Doge (1658–1659)
- Domenico II Contarini, Doge (1659–1674)
- Nicolò Sagredo, Doge (1674–1676)
- Alvise Contarini, Doge (1676–1683)
- Marcantonio Giustinian, Doge (1683–1688)
- Francesco Morosini, Doge (1688–1694)
- Silvestro Valiero, Doge (1694–1700)
- Alvise II Mocenigo, Doge (1700–1709)

Southern Italy

- Kingdom of Naples (complete list) –

The Kingdom of Naples was ruled in personal union with Spain from 1504 to 1713.

- Philip II, King (1598–1621)
- Philip III, King (1621–1647)
- Henry of Guise, Doge (1647–1648)
- Philip III, King (1648–1665)
- Charles V, King (1665–1700)
- Philip IV, King (1700–1713)

- Kingdom of Trinacria: Sicily (complete list) –

- Philip III, King (1598–1621)
- Philip IV, King (1621–1665)
- Charles III, King (1665–1700)
- Philip V, King (1700–1713)

Malta

- Hospitaller Malta (complete list) –

- Martín Garzés, Grand Master (1595–1601)
- Alof de Wignacourt, Grand Master (1601–1622)
- Luís Mendes de Vasconcellos, Grand Master (1622–1623)
- Antoine de Paule, Grand Master (1623–1636)
- Giovanni Paolo Lascaris, Grand Master (1636–1657)
- Martin de Redin, Grand Master (1657–1660)
- Annet de Clermont-Gessant, Grand Master (1660 )
- Rafael Cotoner, Grand Master (1660–1663)
- Nicolás Cotoner, Grand Master (1663–1680)
- Gregorio Carafa, Grand Master (1680–1690)
- Adrien de Wignacourt, Grand Master (1690–1697)
- Ramón Perellós, Grand Master (1697–1720)

=== Europe: Southwest ===
Andorra

- Andorra

- Episcopal Co-Princes (complete list) –

- Andreu Capella, Episcopal Co-Prince (1588–1609)
- Bernat de Salba i Salba, Episcopal Co-Prince (1609–1620)
- Luis Díez de Aux y Armendáriz, Episcopal Co-Prince (1622–1627)
- Antonio Pérez, Episcopal Co-Prince (1627–1632)
- Pau Duran, Episcopal Co-Prince (1634–1651)
- Juan Manuel de Espinosa, Episcopal Co-Prince (1655–1663)
- Melcior Palau i Bosca, Episcopal Co-Prince (1664–1670)
- Pere de Copons i Teixidor, Episcopal Co-Prince (1671–1681)
- Joan Baptista Desbac i Mortorell, Episcopal Co-Prince (1682–1688)
- Oleguer de Montserrat i Rufet, Episcopal Co-Prince (1689–1694)
- Julià Cano Thebar, Episcopal Co-Prince (1695–1714)

- French Co-Princes (complete list) –

- Henry IV, French Co-Prince (1572–1610)
- Louis XIII, French Co-Prince (1610–1643)
- Louis XIV, French Co-Prince (1643–1715)

Catalonia

- Catalan Republic

- Pau Claris, President (1641)

Navarre

- Kingdom of Navarre (complete list) –

- Henry III, King (1572–1610)
- Louis II, King (1610–1620)

Portugal

- Kingdom of Portugal (complete list) –

- Philip II, King (1598–1621)
- Philip III, King (1621–1640)
- John IV, King (1640–1656)
- Afonso VI, King (1656–1683)
- Peter II, King (1683–1706)

Spain

- Habsburg Spain: Crown of Castile and Crown of Aragon

- Monarchs (complete list) –

- Philip III the Pious, King (1598–1621)
- Philip IV, King (1621–1665)
- Charles II the Bewitched, King (1665–1700)

- Bourbon Spain:

- Philip V, King (1700-1724, 1724-1746)

=== Europe: West ===
France

- Kingdom of France: Ancien Régime (complete list) –

- Henry IV, King (1589–1610)
- Louis XIII, King (1610–1643)
- Louis XIV, King (1643–1715)

- Anjou (complete list) –

- Gaston I, Duke (1608–1626)
- Philip I, Duke (1640–1660)
- Philippe Charles, Duke (1668–1671)
- Louis Francis, Duke (1672)
- Philip II, Duke (1683–1700)

- Auvergne (complete list) –

- Charles III, Duke of Lorraine, Count (1589–1608)
- Margaret of Valois, Count (1608–1610)

- County of Maine (complete list) –

- Charles VI of Maine, Count (?–1611)
- Henry, Duke of Mayenne, Count (1611–1621)
- Charles II Gonzaga, Count (1621–1631)
- Ferdinand Gonzaga, Count (1631–1632)
- Charles III Gonzaga, Count (1632–?)

- Monaco (complete list) –

- Ercole, Lord (1589–1604)
- Honoré II, Lord (1604–1612), Prince (1612–1662)
- Louis I, Prince (1662–1701)

- Duchy of Nevers (complete list) –

- Charles III Gonzaga, Duke (1595–1637)
- Charles IV Gonzaga, Duke (1637–1659)
- Jules Mazarin, Duke (1659–1661)
- Philippe Jules Mancini, Duke (1661–1707)

Low Countries

- United Provinces: Dutch Republic

For the preceding rulers, look under the List of state leaders in the 16th-century Holy Roman Empire

- Stadtholders (complete list) –

- Maurice, Stadtholder (1585–1625)
- Frederick Henry, Stadtholder (1625–1647)
- William II, Stadtholder (1647–1650)
- William III, Stadtholder (1672–1702)

- Grand pensionaries (complete list) –

- Johan van Oldenbarnevelt, Grand Pensionary (1586–1619)
- Andries de Witt, Grand Pensionary (1619–1621)
- Anthonie Duyck, Grand Pensionary (1621–1629)
- Jacob Cats, Grand Pensionary (1629–1631)
- Adriaan Pauw, Grand Pensionary (1631–1636)
- Jacob Cats, Grand Pensionary (1636–1651)
- Adriaan Pauw, Grand Pensionary (1651–1653)
- Johan de Witt, Grand Pensionary (1653–1672)
- Gaspar Fagel, Grand Pensionary (1672–1688)
- Michiel ten Hove, Grand Pensionary (1688–1689)
- Anthonie Heinsius, Grand Pensionary (1689–1720)

- County of Drenthe (complete list) –

For the preceding rulers, see the County of Drenthe under the List of state leaders in the 16th-century Holy Roman Empire

- Francisco Verdugo, Stadtholder (1581–1594)
- Frederik van den Bergh, in name only, Stadtholder (1595–1618)
- William Louis of Nassau-Dillenburg, Stadtholder (1595–1620)

- County of Flanders (complete list) –

- Isabella Clara Eugenia, Countess (1598–1621)
- Philip VI, Count (1621–1665)
- Charles IV, Count (1665–1700)
- Philip VII, Count (1700–1706)

- Lordship of Frisia (complete list) –

For the preceding rulers, see the Lordship of Frisia under the List of state leaders in the 16th-century Holy Roman Empire

- Francisco Verdugo, Stadtholder (1581–1594)
- William I, Stadtholder (1580–1884)
- William Louis, Stadtholder (1584–1620)

- Lordship of Groningen (complete list) –

For the preceding rulers, see the Lordship of Groningen under the List of state leaders in the 16th-century Holy Roman Empire

- Francisco Verdugo, Stadtholder (1581–1594)
- William Louis, Stadtholder (1584–1620)

- Duchy of Guelders (complete list) –

For the preceding rulers, see the Duchy of Guelders under the List of state leaders in the 16th-century Holy Roman Empire

- William IV of Bergh, Stadtholder (1581–1585)
- Claude de Berlaymont, Stadtholder (1585–1587)
- Florent de Berlaymont, Stadtholder (1587–1626)
- Adolf van Nieuwenaar, Stadtholder (1584–1589)
- Maurice, Stadtholder (1590–1625)

- County of Holland, Lordship of Utrecht, County of Zeeland (complete list) –

For the preceding rulers, look under the List of state leaders in the 16th-century Holy Roman Empire

- William I, Stadtholder (1572–1584)
- Adolf van Nieuwenaar, Stadtholder (1584–1589)
- Maurice, Stadtholder (1585–1625)

- Lordship of Overijssel (complete list) –

For the preceding rulers, see the Lordship of Overijssel under the List of state leaders in the 16th-century Holy Roman Empire

- Francisco Verdugo, Stadtholder (1581–1594)
- Adolf van Nieuwenaar, Stadtholder (1584–1589)
- Frederik van den Bergh, Stadtholder (1594–1618)

=== Eurasia: Caucasus ===
Georgia

- Principality of Abkhazia (complete list) –

- Putu, Prince (c.1580–1620)
- Seteman, Prince (c.1620–1640)
- Sustar, Prince (c.1640–1665)
- Zegnak, Prince (c.1665–1700)

- Kingdom of Imereti (complete list) –

- Rostom, King (1590–1605)
- George III, King (1605–1639)
- Alexander III, King (1639–1660)
- Bagrat IV, King (1660–1661, 1663–1668, 1669–1678, 1679–1681)
- Vakhtang Tchutchunashvili, King (1661–1663)
- Archil II, King (1661–63, 1678–79, 1690–91, 1695–96, 1698)
- Demetrius Gurieli, King (1663–1664)
- George III Gurieli, King (1681–1683)
- Alexander IV, King (1683–1690, 1691–1695)
- George IV, King (1696–1698)
- Simon, King (1698–1701)

- Kingdom of Kakheti (complete list) –

- Alexander II, King (1574–1602, 1602–1605)
- David I, King (1602)
- Alexander II (restored), King (1602–1605)
- Constantine I, King (1605)
- Teimuraz I, King (1606–1614, 1615, 1625–1633, 1634–1648)

direct Persian rule (1614–1615, 1616–1625, 1633, 1648–1664, 1676–1703)

- Archil II, King (1664–1675)

- Kingdom of Kartli (complete list) –

- George X, King (1600–1606)
- Luarsab II, King (1606–1615)
- Bagrat VII, King (1616–1619)
- Simon II, rival King (1619–1631)
- Teimuraz I, rival King (1625–1633)
- Rostom, King (1633–1658)
- Vakhtang V, King (1658–1676)
- George XI, King (1676–1688, 1703–1709)
- Heraclius I, King (1688–1703)

Russia: Dagestan

- Gazikumukh Khanate (complete list) –

- Surkhay ibn Garai-Bek, Khan (1700–1741)
- Murtazali ibn Surkhay, Khan (1741–1743)
- Muhammad ibn Surkhay, Khan (1743–1789)
- Surkhay ibn Muhammad, Khan (1789–1820)

== Oceania ==
Chile: Easter Island

- Easter Island (complete list) –

- Marama Ariki, King (c.1600)
- Riu Tupa Hotu (Nui Tupa Hotu?), King (?)
- Toko Te Rangi, King (?)
- Kao Aroaro (Re Kauu?), King (?)
- Mataivi, King (?)
- Kao Hoto, King (?)

French Polynesia

- Uvea (complete list) –

- Takumasiva, King (17th century)
- Pou, King (17th century)
- Tuakalau, King (17th century)
- Eiki, King (17th century)
- Tuiuvea, King (17th century)
- Lilo-kaivale, King (17th century)

Tonga

- Tuʻi Tonga Empire (complete list) –

- Moʻunga ʻo Tonga, King (?)
- Fotofili, King (fl.1643)
- Vaea, King (?)
- Moeakiola, King (?)
- Tatafu, King (?)

United States: Hawaii

- Island of Hawaiʻi (complete list) –

- Kaikilani, supreme high chief (female) (1575–1605)
- Keakealanikane, Aliʻi Aimoku (1605–1635)
- Keakamāhana, supreme high chief (female) (1635–1665)
- Keakealaniwahine, supreme high chief (female) (1665–1695)
- Keaweʻīkekahialiʻiokamoku, co-ruler with his half-sister wife Kalanikauleleiaiwi (1695–1725)

- Kauai (complete list) –

- Kawelo a Maihunaliʻi, usurper King (c.1640–1650)

== See also ==
- List of governors of dependent territories in the 17th century
- List of state leaders in the 17th-century Holy Roman Empire
- List of state leaders in 17th-century South Asia
