= Mutara I Nsoro III Semugeshi =

Mutara I Nsoro II Semugeshi
- Mwami (King) of Rwanda
- Issue: Kigeli II Nyamuheshera
- Dynasty: Nyiginya dynasty (3rd)

Mutara I Nsoro II Semugeshi was Mwami of the Kingdom of Rwanda during the 17th century.Jan Vansina proposed that the name of this mwami within the royal genealogy was likely referring to 2 or 3 separate kings.

Regnal titles
Preceded by Ruganzu II Ndoli	King of Rwanda	Succeeded by Kigeli II Nyamuheshera
