= Kalemera Rwaka =

Kalemera Rwaka Ntagara was Mwami of the Kingdom of Rwanda in the mid-18th century.

Jan Vansina suggests from the oral traditions that he was the victim of a coup by Cyilima II Rujugira.

Regnal titles
Preceded by Yuhi III Mazimpaka	King of Rwanda; 1754 - 1766 (co-ruler and regent) 1766-1770 (sole mwami)	Succeeded by Cyilima II Rujugira
