= Bongo Lenge =

Bongo Lenge was a ruler of the Kuba Kingdom in the 17th-century. It was while he was ruler the kingdom began to expand. He fought several years, however how many were to expand and how many were to assert more central control in his domains remains unclear.

== Sources ==
- Thornton, John K. (2020). History of West Central Africa to 1850. Cambridge University Press. p. 214.
