= Mibamwe II Sekarongoro II Gisanura =

Mwami (King)
- Reign: 1700? – 1735
- Died: 1735
- Spouse: Nyirayuhi III Nyamarembo
- Dynasty: Nyiginya dynasty (3rd)
- Father: Kigeli II Nyamuheshera
- Mother: Nyiramibambwe II Nyabuhoro

Mibamwe II Sekarongoro II Gisanura was Mwami (King) of the Kingdom of Rwanda between roughly 1700 and 1735.

Regnal titles
Preceded by Kigeli II Nyamuheshera	King of Rwanda; 1700? – 1735	Succeeded by Yuhi III Mazimpaka
