= Giovanni Serafini =

Italian Cardinal

His Eminence Giovanni Serafini
- Cardinal-Deacon of Santa Maria in Cosmedin
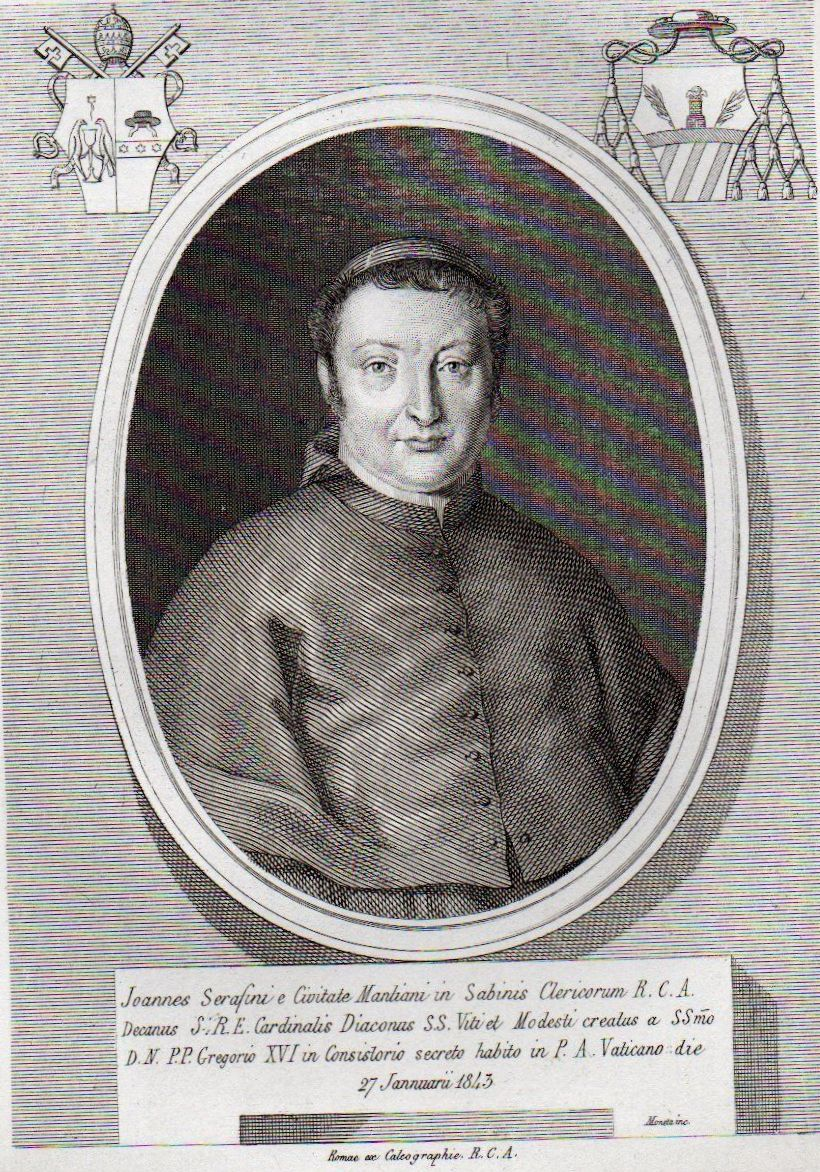
- Church: Roman Catholic Church
- Appointed: 16 April 1846
- Term ended: 1 February 1855
- Predecessor: Paolo Mangelli Orsi
- Successor: Giuseppe Ugolini
- Previous post: Cardinal-Priest of Santi Vito, Modesto e Crescenzio (1843-46)

Orders
- Created cardinal: 27 January 1843 by Pope Gregory XVI
- Rank: Cardinal-Deacon

Personal details
- Born: Giovanni Serafini; 15 October 1786 Magliano Sabina, Papal States
- Died: 1 February 1855 (aged 68) Rome, Papal States
- Buried: Santa Maria in Cosmedin
- Education: Pontifical Academy of Ecclesiastical Nobles

Giovanni Serafini (15 October 1786 - 1 February 1855) was an Italian Cardinal. He was the Cardinal-Deacon of Santi Vito, Modesto e Crescenzio from 1843 to 1846 and then the Cardinal-Deacon of Santa Maria in Cosmedin from 1846 until his death in 1855.
