= List of captains regent of San Marino, 1500–1700 =

This is a list of captains regent (Capitani Reggenti) of San Marino from 1500 to 1700.

Year	Semester	Captain Regent	Captain Regent
1500	April	Menetto di Menetto Bonelli	Antonio di Maurizio Lunardini
1500	October	Francesco di Girolamo Belluzzi	Simone di Antonio Belluzzi
1501	April	Antonio di Polinoro Lunardini	Fabrizio di Pier Leone Corbelli
1501	October	Cristoforo di Giacomino di Bartolo	Biagio di Bartolo Pasini
1502	April	Antonio di Girolamo	Gabriele di Bartolo
1502	October	Giuliano di Bartolomeo	Angelo di Paolo Fabbri
1503	April	Antonio di Bianco	Bartolo di Antonio
1503	July	Simone di Antonio Belluzzi	Giovanni di Cristoforo di Vita
1503	October	Francesco di Girolamo	Bonifazio di Andrea
1504	April	Fabrizio di Pier Leone Corbelli	Marino di Niccolò di Giovanetto
1504	October	Antonio di Girolamo	Francesco di Marino Giangi
1505	April	Francesco di Girolamo Belluzzi	Giuliano di Bartolomeo
1505	October	Antonio di Bianco	Antonio di Marino Giannini
1506	April	Andrea di Giorgio Loli	Camillo di Menetto Bonelli
1506	October	Antonio di Polinoro Lunardini	Antonio di Maurizio Lunardini
1507	April	Fabrizio di Pier Leone Corbelli	Sammaritano di Andrea Tini
1507	October	Marino di Niccolò di Giovanetto	Leonardo di Giovanni di Belluzzi
1508	April	Cristoforo Martelli	Giacomo di Lodovico Calcigni
1508	October	Antonio di Girolamo	Francesco di Marino Giangi
1509	April	Innocenzo di Menetto Bonelli	Antonio di Benetto
1509	October	Andrea di Giorgio Loli	Antonio di Marino Giannini
1510	April	Antonio di Polinoro Lunardini	Andrea di Marino Speranza
1510	October	Antonio di Bianco	Barnaba di Matteo da Valle
1511	April	Marino di Niccolò di Giovanetto	Biagio di Bartolo Pasini
1511	October	Antonio di Girolamo	Giovanni di Cristoforo Vita
1512	April	Andrea Giangi	Marino di Severo
1512	October	Leonardo di Giovanni Belluzzi	Sammaritano di Andrea Tini
1513	April	Cristoforo di Girolamo	Cristoforo Martelli
1513	October	Antonio di Benetto	Benedetto di Marino Benettini
1514	April	Antonio di Maurizio Lunardini	Francesco Giangi
1514	October	Francesco di Simone Belluzzi	Innocenzo di Menetto Bonelli
1515	April	Carlo di Cristofaro	Giacomo di Lodovico Calcigni
1515	October	Francesco di Girolamo Belluzzi	Antonio di Bartolo
1516	April	Camillo di Menetto Bonelli	Girolamo di Giuliano Gozi
1516	October	Diotallevo Corbelli	Sammaritano di Andrea Tini
1517	April	Carlo di Cristofaro	Giacomo di Lodovico Calcigni
1517	October	Andrea di Bonifazio	Antonio di Maurizio Lunardini
1518	April	Camillo di Menetto Bonelli	Leonardo di Giovanni Belluzzi
1518	October	Francesco di Girolamo Belluzzi	Antonio di Polinoro Lunardini
1519	April	Girolamo di Giuliano Gozi	Pietro di Sabatino di Bianco
1519	October	Innocenzo di Menetto Bonelli	Francesco di Antonio Belluzzi
1520	April	Antonio di Maurizio Lunardini	Marino di Severo
1520	October	Andrea di Bonifazio	Francesco di Girolamo Belluzzi
1521	April	Bartolomeo di Antonio Amanti	Bartolo di Simone Belluzzi
1521	October	Cristofaro Martelli	Giacomo di Lodovico Calcigni
1522	April	Girolamo di Giuliano Gozi	Giuliano di Bartolomeo
1522	October	Antonio di Polinoro Lunardini	Marino di Antonio
1523	April	Bartolomeo di Antonio	Girolamo di Evangelista Belluzzi
1523	October	Francesco di Simone Belluzzi	Francesco di Sante di Biagio
1524	April	Camillo di Menetto Bonelli	Leonardo di Giovanni Belluzzi
1524	October	Giacomo di Antonio Giannini	Bartolomeo di Antonio Amanti
1525	April	Innocenzo di Menetto Bonelli	Pier Leone di Fabrizio Corbelli
1525	October	Melchiorre di Francesco Belluzzi	Sammaritano di Andrea Tini
1526	April	Girolamo di Giuliano Gozi	Federigo di Brandano Calcigni
1526	October	Francesco di Simone Belluzzi	Marino di Severo
1527	April	Andrea Sabbatini	Carlo di Cristofaro
1527	October	Bartolomeo di Antonio Amanti (died 1528, replaced by Melchiorre di Francesco)	Giacomo di Lodovico Calcigni
1528	April	Diottalevo Corbelli	Giuliano di Marino Righi
1528	October	Girolamo di Giuliano Gozi	Girolamo di Evangelista Belluzzi
1529	April	Camillo di Menetto Bonelli	Bartolo Belluzzi
1529	October	Lodovico di Pietro Calcigni	Antonio di Pietro Tosini
1530	April	Melchiorre di Francesco Belluzzi	Giacomo di Lodovico Pinti
1530	October	Giacomo di Lodovico Calcigni	Pier Leone di Fabrizio Corbelli
1531	April	Francesco di Simone Belluzzi	Giacomo di Antonio Giannini
1531	October	Polinoro di Antonio Lunardini	Girolamo di Giuliano Gozi
1532	April	Carlo di Cristofaro	Innocenzo di Menetto Bonelli
1532	October	Bartolo di Simone Belluzzi	Sammaritano di Andrea Tini
1533	April	Giacomo di Lodovico Calcigni	Girolamo di Evangelista Belluzzi
1533	October	Camillo di Menetto Bonelli	Melchiorre di Francesco Belluzzi
1534	April	Pier Leone di Fabrizio Corbelli	Giuliano di Marino Righi
1534	October	Francesco di Simone Belluzzi	Giacomo di Antonio Giannini
1535	April	Girolamo di Giuliano Gozi	Antonio di Pietro Tontini
1535	October	Innocenzo di Menetto Bonelli	Giacomo di Evangelista Belluzzi
1536	April	Melchiorre di Francesco Belluzzi	Sammaritano di Andrea Tini
1536	October	Bartolo di Simone Belluzzi	Pier Leone di Fabrizio Corbelli
1537	April	Girolamo di Evangelista Belluzzi	Girolamo di Francesco Giannini
1537	October	Giuliano di Marino Righi	Giacomo di Antonio Giannini
1538	April	Francesco di Simone Belluzzi	Girolamo di Giuliano Gozi
1538	October	Carlo di Cristofaro Gianolini	Cristofaro di Marino Giangi
1539	April	Melchiorre di Francesco Belluzzi	Niccolò di Sante di Biagio
1539	October	Bartolo di Simone Belluzzi	Giacomo di Antonio Giannini
1540	April	Gio. Antonio di Francesco Belluzzi	Pier Leone di Fabrizio Corbelli
1540	October	Girolamo di Giuliano Gozi	Vincenzo di Bartolo Gombertini
1541	April	Girolamo di Evangelista Belluzzi	Stanghelino di Francesco Belluzzi
1541	October	Giuliano di Marino Righi	Giacomo di Lodovico Pinti
1542	April	Polinoro Lunardini	Cristofaro di Marino Giangi
1542	October	Carlo Gianolini	Marino Gabrielli
1543	April	Antonio di Pietro Tontini	Giacomo di Evangelista Belluzzi
1543	October	Girolamo Giannini	Carlo di Francesco Lunardini
1544	April	Polinoro Lunardini	Bartolo di Simone Belluzzi
1544	October	Giovanni Antonio Belluzzi	Vincenzo Gombertini
1545	April	Girolamo di Giuliano Gozi	Innocenzo Brancuti
1545	October	Giuliano di Marino Righi	Marino Gabrielli
1546	April	Bonetto di Marino Bonetti	Baldo di Gaspare
1546	October	Pier Leone di Fabrizio Corbelli	Bernardino Giannini
1547	April	Gio. Antonio Leonardelli	Stanghelino di Francesco Belluzzi
1547	October	Gio. Lodovico di Matteo Belluzzi	Pier Paolo Bonelli (replaced February 23, 1548, by Bartolo Belluzzi)
1548	April	Giovanni Antonio Belluzzi	Sante di Marco Gori
1548	October	Giacomo di Antonio Giannini	Francesco di Sebastiano Onofri
1549	April	Giuliano di Marino Righi	Girolamo di Evangelista Belluzzi
1549	October	Bartolo Belluzzi	Rinaldo di Giovanni Baldi
1550	April	Polinoro Lunardini	Biagio di Matteo Tura
1550	October	Gio. Antonio Leonardelli	Cristofaro di Marino Giangi
1551	April	Girolamo Giannini	Marino di Andrea
1551	October	Pier Leone Corbelli	Pier Matteo Belluzzi
1552	April	Gio. Lodovico di Matteo Belluzzi	Baldo di Gaspare
1552	October	Antonio di Piero Tontini	Vincenzo di Giovanni di Andrea
1553	April	Vincenzo Gombertini	Giacomo di Antonio Giannini
1553	October	Gio. Antonio Belluzzi	Rinaldo di Giovanni Baldi
1554	April	Innocenzo Brancuti	Giacomo di Evangelista Belluzzi
1554	October	Marc'Antonio Gozi	Francesco di Sebastiano Onofri
1555	April	Giuliano di Marino Righi	Gio. Antonio di Antonio
1555	October	Bartolo Belluzzi	Pier Paolo Corbelli
1556	April	Gio. Antonio Leonardelli	Bonetto di Marino Bonetti
1556	October	Antonio Brancuti	Baldo di Gaspare
1557	April	Gio. Lodovico di Matteo Belluzzi	Vincenzo Giannini
1557	October	Pier Paolo Bonelli	Vincenzo Gombertini
1558	April	Girolamo Giannini	Francesco di Sebastiano Onofri
1558	October	Innocenzo Brancuti	Rinaldo di Giovanni Baldi
1559	April	Bartolo Belluzzi	Pier Paolo Corbelli
1559	October	Gio. Antonio Leonardelli	Sinibaldo Sinibaldi
1560	April	Giacomo di Evangelista Belluzzi	Vincenzo di Marino di Andrea
1560	October	Pier Leone Corbelli	Giovanni Sinibaldi
1561	April	Vincenzo Gombertini	Bernardino Giannini
1561	October	Francesco di Sebastiano Onofri	Francesco di Pier Paolo Martelli
1562	April	Girolamo Giannini	Claudio Belluzzi
1562	October	Pier Paolo Bonelli	Marc'Antonio Gozi
1563	April	Pier Matteo Belluzzi	Pier Paolo Corbelli
1563	October	Ludovico Belluzzi	Marc'Antonio Bonetti
1564	April	Gio. Andrea Belluzzi	Rinaldo di Giovanni Baldi
1564	October	Antonio Brancuti	Benedetto di Bianco
1565	April	Vincenzo Gombertini	Giacomo di Evangelista Belluzzi
1565	October	Bonetto di Marino Bonetti	Marino Bonelli
1566	April	Marc'Antonio Gozi	Giovanni Antonio di Antonio
1566	October	Girolamo Giannini	Sebastiano di Cristofaro Giangi
1567	April	Francesco di Pier Paolo Martelli	Marino di Cristofaro Giangi
1567	October	Giuliano Corbelli	Giovanni Andrea Belluzzi
1568	April	Pier Paolo Bonelli	Pier Paolo Corbelli
1568	October	Antonio Brancuti	Liberio Gabrielli
1569	April	Pier Matteo Belluzzi	Vincenzo Giannini
1569	October	Ippolito Gombertini	Sinibaldo Sinibaldi
1570	April	Marc'Antonio Gozi	Marc'Antonio Bonetti
1570	October	Girolamo Giannini	Ascanio di Giacomo Belluzzi
1571	April	Giovanni Antonio Leonardelli	Benedetto di Bianco
1571	October	Pier Paolo Corbelli	Giovanni Paolo di Giuliano
1572	April	Innocenzo Brancuti	Francesco Giannini
1572	October	Pier Matteo Belluzzi	Antonio di Angelo Bellini
1573	April	Antonio Brancuti	Gio. Lodovico di Matteo Belluzzi
1573	October	Lodovico Belluzzi	Vincenzo Giannini
1574	April	Marc'Antonio Gozi	Gio. Antonio di Antonio
1574	October	Giambattista Belluzzi	Benedetto di Bianco
1575	April	Giuliano Corbelli	Liberio Gabrielli
1575	October	Girolamo Giannini	Vincenzo di Marino di Andrea
1576	April	Pier Paolo Corbelli	Sinibaldo Sinibaldi
1576	October	Innocenzo Brancuti	Francesco Onofri
1577	April	Francesco di Paolo di Giuliano	Gio. Lodovico di Matteo Belluzzi
1577	October	Pier Matteo Belluzzi	Vincenzo Giannini
1578	April	Ippolito Gombertini	Francesco Giannini
1578	October	Liberio Gabrielli	Ascanio Belluzzi
1579	April	Girolamo Giannini	Benedetto di Bianco
1579	October	Lodovico Belluzzi	Giovanni Calcigni
1580	April	Pier Paolo Corbelli	Marino Bonelli
1580	October	Giambattista Belluzzi	Sinibaldo Sinibaldi
1581	April	Innocenzo Brancuti	Gio. Lodovico di Matteo Belluzzi
1581	October	Giuliano Corbelli	Gio. Paolo Belluzzi
1582	April	Ippolito Gombertini	Pier Marino Cionini
1582	October	Gio. Antonio Leonardelli	Francesco Giannini
1583	April	Pier Matteo Belluzzi	Marc'Antonio Gozi
1583	October	Pier Paolo Corbelli	Francesco Martelli
1584	April	Federico Sinibaldi	Vincenzo Giannini
1584	October	Innocenzo Brancuti	Gio. Lodovico Belluzzi
1585	April	Bonetto Bonetti	Gio. Maria Giangi
1585	October	Giuliano Corbelli	Liberio Gabrielli
1586	April	Ascanio Belluzzi	Francesco Giannini
1586	October	Paol'Antonio Onofri	Giambattista Belluzzi
1587	April	Lodovico Belluzzi	Pier Marino Cionini
1587	October	Gio. Antonio Leonardelli	Pier Paolo Corbelli
1588	April	Pier Matteo Belluzzi	Vincenzo Giannini
1588	October	Marc'Aurelio Brancuti	Giambattista Belluzzi
1589	April	Giuliano Corbelli	Liberio Gabrielli
1589	October	Federico Sinibaldi	Marino Pellicieri
1590	April	Francesco Giannini	Giambattista Fabbri
1590	October	Orazio Giannini	Giambattista Belluzzi
1591	April	Lodovico Belluzzi	Ascanio Belluzzi
1591	October	Pier Matteo Belluzzi	Ottaviano Gozi
1592	April	Pier Marino Cionini	Giuliano Gozi
1592	October	Camillo Bonelli (replaced 1592 by Giovanni Paolo Belluzzi)	Paol'Antonio Onofri
1593	April	Giuliano Corbelli	Annibale Belluzzi
1593	October	Giambattista Belluzzi	Francesco Giannini
1594	April	Liberio Gabrielli	Innocenzo Bonelli
1594	October	Federico Brandani	Vincenzo Giannini
1595	April	Fabrizio Belluzzi	Francesco Maria Corbelli
1595	October	Pier Marino Cionini	Lattanzio Valli
1596	April	Orazio Belluzzi	Matteo Ceccoli
1596	October	Camillo Bonelli	Annibale Belluzzi
1597	April	Paolo Antonio Onofri	Gio. Francesco Belluzzi
1597	October	Camillo Bonelli	Annibale Belluzzi
1598	April	Giuliano Gozi	Francesco Giannini
1598	October	Giambattista Belluzzi	Innocenzo Bonelli
1599	April	Pier Marino Cionini	Giambattista Fabbri
1599	October	Orazio Belluzzi	Lattanzio Valli
1600	April	Pier Francesco Bonetti	Belluzzo Belluzzi
1600	October	Pier Matteo Belluzzi	Fabrizio Belluzzi
1601	April	Lorenzo Martelli	Liberio Gabrielli
1601	October	Girolamo Gozi	Francesco Giannini
1602	April	Giuliano Gozi	Innocenzo Bonelli
1602	October	Giambattista Belluzzi	Francesco Maria Corbelli
1603	April	Orazio Belluzzi	Scipione Gabrielli
1603	October	Francesco Bonelli	Lattanzio Valli
1604	April	Pier Francesco Bonetti	Giambattista Fabbri
1604	October	Pier Marino Cionini	Annibale Gozi
1605	April	Tiberio Gabrielli	Francesco Giannini
1605	October	Girolamo Gozi	Innocenzo Bonelli
1606	April	Pier Matteo Belluzzi	Fabrizio Belluzzi
1606	October	Annibale Belluzzi	Giuliano Fattori
1607	April	Lorenzo Martelli	Leone Pellicieri
1607	October	Camillo Bonelli	Giambattista Belluzzi
1608	April	Pier Francesco Bonelli	Giuliano Belluzzi
1608	October	Pietro Tosini Corbelli	Teodoro Leonardelli
1609	April	Orazio Belluzzi	Orazio Giangi
1609	October	Girolamo Gozi	Lattanzio Valli
1610	April	Fabrizio Belluzzi	Giambattista Fabbri
1610	October	Gio. Andrea Belluzzi	Sebastiano Onofri
1611	April	Pier Marino Cionini	Annibale Gozi
1611	October	Francesco Bonelli	Belluzzo Belluzzi
1612	April	Pier Francesco Bonetti	Francesco Maria Corbelli
1612	October	Pietro Tosini Corbelli	Innocenzo Bonelli
1613	April	Camillo Bonelli	Lattanzio Valli
1613	October	Annibale Belluzzi	Giambattista Fabbri
1614	April	Gio. Andrea Belluzzi	Fabrizio Belluzzi
1614	October	Giuliano Belluzzi	Teodoro Leonardelli
1615	April	Girolamo Gozi	Francesco Giannini
1615	October	Orazio Belluzzi	Flaminio Cionini
1616	April	Pier Francesco Bonetti	Francesco Bonelli
1616	October	Camillo Bonelli	Belluzzo Belluzzi
1617	April	Annibale Belluzzi	Giambattista Fabbri
1617	October	Gio. Andrea Belluzzi	Lattanzio Valli
1618	April	Fabrizio Belluzzi	Gabriele Gabrielli
1618	October	Girolamo Gozi	Gio. Pietro Martelli
1619	April	Francesco Giannini	Annibale Gozi
1619	October	Orazio Belluzzi	Andrea Giannini
1620	April	Giuliano Belluzzi	Teodoro Leonardelli
1620	October	Camillo Bonelli	Belluzzo Belluzzi
1621	April	Bernardino Belluzzi	Lattanzio Valli
1621	October	Gio. Andrea Belluzzi	Fabrizio Belluzzi
1622	April	Girolamo Gozi	Pier Marino Ricci
1622	October	Annibale Belluzzi	Marino Belluzzi
1623	April	Giacomo Bonetti	Annibale Gozi
1623	October	Giuliano Belluzzi	Enea Bonelli
1624	April	Pietro Tosini Corbelli	Gian Giacomo Serafini
1624	October	Lattanzio Valli	Michel Angelo Busignani
1625	April	Orazio Belluzzi	Pier Leone Corbelli
1625	October	Camillo Bonelli	Giambattista Fabbri
1626	April	Francesco Giannini	Livio Pellicieri
1626	October	Belluzzo Belluzzi	Pier Marino Ricci
1627	April	Annibale Loli	Pier Antonio Gabrielli
1627	October	Pietro Tosini Corbelli	Andrea Giannini
1628	April	Lattanzio Valli	Sforza Cionini
1628	October	Giuliano Belluzzi	Michel Angelo Busignani
1629	April	Marc'Antonio Bonetti	Gian Giacomo Serafini
1629	October	Orazio Belluzzi	Federico Gozi
1630	April	Livio Pellicieri	Pier Marino Ricci
1630	October	Belluzzo Belluzzi	Rinaldo Ranieri
1631	April	Melchiorre Maggio Belluzzi	Pier Antonio Giangi
1631	October	Fulgenzio Maccioni	Vincenzo Zampini
1632	April	Pietro Tosini	Evangelista Belluzzi
1632	October	Giuliano Belluzzi	Sforza Cionini
1633	April	Marc'Antonio Bonetti	Bartolomeo Ceccoli
1633	October	Torquato Giannini	Bartolomeo Fabbri
1634	April	Lattanzio Valli	Federico Gozi
1634	October	Orazio Belluzzi	Vincenzo Lorenzoni
1635	April	Livio Pellicieri	Paolo Antonio Onofri
1635	October	Giuliano Gozi	Stefano Ricci
1636	April	Fulgenzio Maccioni	Giuliano Belluzzi
1636	October	Marc'Antonio Bonetti	Bartolomeo Ceccoli
1637	April	Pietro Tosini	Giambattista Loli
1637	October	Melchiorre Maggio Belluzzi	Giovanni Serafini
1638	April	Claudio Belluzzi	Pier Leone Corbelli
1638	October	Livio Pellicieri	Federico Tosini
1639	April	Vincenzo Lorenzoni	Paolo Antonio Onofri
1639	October	Fulgenzio Maccioni	Annibale Loli
1640	April	Marc'Antonio Bonetti	Giuliano Belluzzi
1640	October	Giambattista Belluzzi	Federico Gozi
1641	April	Giambattista Ricci	Pier Antonio Giangi
1641	October	Sforza Cionini	Bartolomeo Ceccoli
1642	April	Giacomo Belluzzi	Giovanni Serafini
1642	October	Claudio Belluzzi	Paolo Antonio Onofri
1643	April	Fulgenzio Maccioni	Federico Tosini
1643	October	Melchiorre Maggio Belluzzi	Evangelista Belluzzi
1644	April	Livio Pellicieri	Gregorio Ceccoli
1644	October	Giuliano Belluzzi	Pier Leone Corbelli
1645	April	Sforza Cionini	Vincenzo Francini
1645	October	Marc'Antonio Bonetti	Ottavio Giannini
1646	April	Carlo Loli	Vincenzo Lorenzoni
1646	October	Claudio Belluzzi	Paolo Antonio Onofri
1647	April	Carlo Tosini	Pier Marino Cionini
1647	October	Bartolomeo Belluzzi	Marino Gabrielli
1648	April	Giacomo Belluzzi	Giovanni Serafini
1648	October	Giuliano Gozi	Pier Leone Corbelli
1649	April	Marc'Antonio Bonetti	Innocenzo Bonelli
1649	October	Fulgenzio Maccioni	Federico Tosini
1650	April	Melchiorre Maggio Belluzzi	Girolamo Moracci
1650	October	Carlo Tosini	Paolo Antonio Onofri
1651	April	Alessandro Belluzzi	Vincenzo Lorenzoni
1651	October	Carlo Loli	Gregorio Ceccoli
1652	April	Ottavio Giannini	Bartolomeo Ceccoli
1652	October	Giacomo Belluzzi	Innocenzo Bonelli
1653	April	Lodovico Belluzzi	Giovanni Serafini
1653	October	Marc'Antonio Bonetti	Pompeo Zoli
1654	April	Fulgenzio Maccioni	Cristofaro Gianotti
1654	October	Carlo Tosini	Paolo Antonio Onofri
1655	April	Carlo Loli	Sforza Cionini
1655	October	Ottavio Giannini	Bartolomeo Ceccoli
1656	April	Melchiorre Maggio Belluzzi	Vincenzo Lorenzoni
1656	October	Alessandro Belluzzi	Giovanni Serafini
1657	April	Innocenzo Bonelli	Girolamo Moracci
1657	October	Giacomo Belluzzi	Pier Leone Corbelli
1658	April	Fulgenzio Maccioni	Marino Bonetti
1658	October	Carlo Loli	Pompeo Zoli
1659	April	Ottavio Giannini	Cristofaro Gianotti
1659	October	Paolo Antonio Onofri	Antonio Ricci (died 1660, replaced by Francesco Angeli)
1660	April	Vincenzo Lorenzoni	Giovanni Serafini
1660	October	Alessandro Belluzzi	Giambattista Zampini
1661	April	Giacomo Belluzzi	Sforza Cionini
1661	October	Carlo Tosini	Innocenzo Bonelli
1662	April	Fulgenzio Maccioni	Girolamo Moracci
1662	October	Lodovico Belluzzi	Pompeo Zoli
1663	April	Melchiorre Maggio Belluzzi	Paolo Antonio Onofri
1663	October	Marc'Antonio Gozi	Cristoforo Gianotti
1664	April	Carlo Loli	Vincenzo Lorenzoni
1664	October	Francesco Maccioni	Giovanni Serafini
1665	April	Ottavio Giannini	Francesco Angeli
1665	October	Carlo Tosini	Sforza Cionini
1666	April	Giacomo Belluzzi	Giambattista Tosini
1666	October	Alessandro Belluzzi	Pompeo Zoli
1667	April	Lodovico Belluzzi	Innocenzo Bonelli
1667	October	Paolo Antonio Onofri	Domizio Beni
1668	April	Carlo Loli	Giambattista Zampini
1668	October	Francesco Maccioni	Francesco Loli
1669	April	Ottavio Giannini	Francesco Angeli
1669	October	Giacomo Belluzzi	Giambattista Tosini
1670	April	Marc'Antonio Gozi	Marc'Antonio Ceccoli
1670	October	Lodovico Belluzzi	Innocenzo Bonelli
1671	April	Paolo Antonio Onofri	Pompeo Zoli
1671	October	Carlo Tosini	Giovanni Serafini
1672	April	Carlo Loli	Giambattista Zampini
1672	October	Alessandro Belluzzi	Sforza Cionini
1673	April	Ottavio Giannini	Alfonso Tosini
1673	October	Giambattista Tosini	Francesco Angeli
1674	April	Francesco Maccioni	Francesco Loli
1674	October	Marc'Antonio Gozi	Innocenzo Bonelli
1675	April	Paolo Antonio Onofri	Giovanni Serafini
1675	October	Carlo Tosini	Lorenzo Giangi
1676	April	Giuliano Cionini	Pompeo Zoli
1676	October	Lodovico Belluzzi	Giambattista Zampini
1677	April	Giambattista Tosini	Francesco Angeli
1677	October	Carlo Loli	Marc'Antonio Ceccoli
1678	April	Marc'Antonio Gozi	Innocenzo Bonelli
1678	October	Ottavio Giannini	Alfonso Tosini
1679	April	Francesco Maccioni	Francesco Loli
1679	October	Carlo Tosini	Lorenzo Giangi
1680	April	Alessandro Belluzzi	Giambattista Fattori
1680	October	Giambattista Tosini	Melchiorre Martelli
1681	April	Giacomo Belluzzi	Giovanni Serafini
1681	October	Paolo Antonio Onofri	Francesco Angeli
1682	April	Carlo Loli	Gaspare Calbini
1682	October	Marc'Antonio Gozi	Innocenzo Bonelli
1683	April	Francesco Maccioni	Alfonso Tosini
1683	October	Carlo Tosini	Lorenzo Giangi
1684	April	Giuliano Belluzzi	Giambattista Fattori
1684	October	Francesco Loli	Pietro Francini
1685	April	Ottavio Leonardelli	Melchiorre Martelli
1685	October	Paolo Antonio Onofri	Ridolfo Zoli
1686	April	Carlo Loli	Gaspare Calbini
1686	October	Gio. Antonio Belluzzi	Alfonso Tosini
1687	April	Alessandro Belluzzi	Marc'Antonio Ceccoli
1687	October	Giuliano Belluzzi	Giambattista Fattori
1688	April	Innocenzo Bonelli	Francesco Angeli
1688	October	Francesco Maccioni	Pietro Francini
1689	April	Francesco Loli	Matteo Martelli
1689	October	Carlo Loli	Gaspare Calbini
1690	April	Gio. Antonio Belluzzi	Melchiorre Martelli
1690	October	Ottavio Leonardelli	Lorenzo Giangi
1691	April	Alfonso Tosini	Baldassarre Tini
1691	October	Lodovico Manenti Belluzzi	Marino Beni
1692	April	Francesco Maccioni	Gio. Antonio Fattori
1692	October	Innocenzo Bonelli	Pietro Francini
1693	April	Francesco Loli	Matteo Martelli
1693	October	Giuliano Belluzzi	Melchiorre Martelli
1694	April	Giuseppe Loli	Gaspare Calbini
1694	October	Bernardino Leonardelli	Lorenzo Giangi
1695	April	Onofrio Onofri	Francesco Angeli
1695	October	Lodovico Manenti Belluzzi	Marc'Antonio Ceccoli
1696	April	Francesco Maccioni	Gio. Antonio Fattori
1696	October	Gio. Antonio Belluzzi	Ottavio Leonardelli
1697	April	Giambattista Tosini	Marino Beni
1697	October	Giuliano Belluzzi	Melchiorre Martelli
1698	April	Innocenzo Bonelli	Lorenzo Giangi
1698	October	Onofrio Onofri	Giambattista Ceccoli
1699	April	Bernardino Leonardelli	Pietro Arancini
1699	October	Francesco Maccioni	Giovanni Antonio Fattori
1700	April	Francesco Loli	Baldassarre Tini
1700	October	Ottavio Leonardelli	Marino Beni

== See also ==
- Diarchy
- List of captains regent of San Marino, 1243–1500
- List of captains regent of San Marino, 1700–1900
- List of captains regent of San Marino, 1900–present
- Politics of San Marino
