= Yuhi III Mazimpaka =

King of Rwanda

Mwami (King)
- Reign: 1735 – 1766
- Dynasty: Nyiginya dynasty (3rd)
- Father: Mibamwe II Sekarongoro II Gisanura
- Mother: Nyirayuhi III Nyamarembo

Yuhi III Mazimpaka (scientific orthography: Yuhi wa Gatatu Mazimpakâ) was the Mwami (King) of kingdom of Rwanda from 1735 to 1766.

He is remembered as having been an exceptionally handsome young king. He was a highly intelligent and creative man. He is said to have been a painter with words (umusizi)/poet and a prophet. He revealed from his dreams the coming of a pale race of people in many years after his death that would lead to the downfall of his kingdom. King Yuhi III commissioned a construction of a three storeyed house made of tree trunks, reeds and grass straws at a place known as Kamonyi. It is thought to have been the first storeyed house ever built in Rwanda. He suffered occasional mental illness due to his combination of intensive meditations/envisioning and the daily running of the Kingdom. He died from a leg injury which he sustained from an attempt to dive from a high rock into a lake where he had gone to swim.

Regnal titles
Preceded by Mibamwe II Sekarongoro II Gisanura	King of Rwanda; 1735 – 1766	Succeeded by Kalemera Rwaka
