= Kigeli II Nyamuheshera =

Mwami (King)
- Reign: 14th century
- Burial: Burenga near Shayo-Byumba
- Spouse: Nyirakigeli II Ncendeli
- Dynasty: Nyiginya dynasty (3rd)
- Father: Mutara I Nsoro III Semugeshi

Kigeli II Nyamuheshera was a Mwami (King) of the Kingdom of Rwanda in the 14th century.

The traditions argue that he was a great warrior and expansionist. He had a strong army known as the "Inkingi" (pillar). One of his military camps, known as "Iziruguru", was attacked by a people called "Abanyabungo" from the western Kivu in the modern-day Congo. Kigeli II attacked chiefdoms in eastern Congo, including Bishugi, Kamuronsi, Gishali, Buhunde, Buzi, and Tongo (Masisi). He was stopped by thick rain forests from proceeding further into Congo. He redirected his expansionist attacks into western Uganda, around Lake Edward, and stopped at the "rock of Kabasha" (urutare rwa Kabasha) and marked it as the then border between Rwanda and Busongora. Busongora was also known as the land of the Bacwezi. It was against Rwandan customary law to attack Busongora as it was believed to be the home of the god Ryangombe.

He attacked and conquered chiefdoms of Buberuka and confiscated their drum known as "Icyungo" and attacked Kigezi and Bushengero where he came upon a unique variety of beans cultivated in Rwanda to this day and which supplanted the indigenous type that was known as "Ibiharo". He also confiscated from Bunyoro a breed of goats known as "Ihene z'Akamenesho". These goats were large and were assigned special care. A tradition of goat show and parade was introduced at the palace until the reign of Yuhi V Musinga during whose time a caretaker named Bunyereri wa Muhozi from Gishubi in Gitarama was the goats' shepherd.

During Kigeli II Nyamuheshera's reign, parts of Rwanda were under occupation by neighboring kingdoms. Some of the areas effected were the territories of Bwanacyambwe, which had been confiscated by a king known as Kimenyi II Shumbusho, and the territories of Gisaka and Ndorwa, found in modern parts of north western Tanzania and south western Uganda. Kigeli II's opportunity to attack and reclaim Bwanacyambwe and Gisaka arose when the teenage king of Ndorwa, Gahaya I Rutindageli, initiated a conflict against his cousin, the teenage king of Gisaka, Kimenyi III Rwahasha. These two kings were still too young to rule in their own right, so their mothers ruled on their behalf.

Ndorwa's queen mother, Nyiragahaya I, went to war against Nyirakimenyi III Kabonde of Gisaka on behalf of their sons. The fight took palace at Muzizi near Lake Muhazi. The Ndorwa aggressors defeated Queen Nyirakimenyi III of Gisaka. Nyirakimenyi suffered a humiliating defeat. She was captured and had her breasts cut off by her inlaw Nyiragahaya I.

Gisaka's teenage King Kimenyi III was a nephew of Bwanacyambwe's King Kimenyi II Shumbusho. After his mother's horrific defeat, the people of Gisaka and Bwanacyambwe's king Kimenyi II requested Rwandan King Kigeli II Nyamuheshera (their former nemesis) to help hide the teenage king and lend them military power to drive Ndorwa Queen Nyiragahaya I out of Gisaka.

Kigeli II agreed on condition that King Kimenyi return the territory of Bwanacyambwe to the Kingdom of Rwanda. Kimenyi II agreed to Kigeli II's condition. The two set off and launched a combined army against Queen Nyiragahaya I's army. The Ndorwa army was defeated on the first attack and the Kingdom of Rwanda regained its territory of Bwanacyambwe. At that point, Kigeli II Nyamuheshera spared King Kimenyi II & III's lives and refrained from capturing the territory of Gisaka, as it was under a boy king. It was dishonorable in Rwandan tradition to attack and conquer a kingdom whose king was still a child. Instead Gisaka became a Rwandan protectorate. It was to fully become part of Rwanda a few centuries later during the reign of Rwabugili IV.

Kigeli II Nyamuheshera's reign is also marked by the death of his queen, Nyirakigeli II Ncenderi, by suicide after she suspected that she was pregnant through adultery. Queen Nyirakigeli II Ncenderi was buried at Butangampundu, a special burial place for Rwandan kings, queens, and royals that were suspected to have died as a result of suicide.

Kigeli II Nyamuheshera was buried at Burenga near Shayo in Byumba. He had a medal of honor known as "Umudende" for defeating seven foreign kings.

Regnal titles
Preceded by Mutara I Nsoro III Semugeshi	King of Rwanda; 17th century	Succeeded by Mibamwe II Sekarongoro II Gisanura
