= Ambrósio I of Kongo =

Ambrósio I
- Manikongo
- Reign: March 1626 to March 1631
- Predecessor: Garcia I
- Successor: Álvaro IV
- Dynasty: Kwilu dynasty

Ambrósio I Nimi a Nkanga was a mwenekongo of the Kingdom of Kongo who ruled from (March 1626 to March 7, 1631.)

== Rise to Power ==
Ambrósio I was the nephew of Álvaro III and as such was a member of the royal House of Kwilu. When Alvaro III died on May 4 of 1622, he had only a young son to leave as heir. Instead of putting an easily manipulated juvenile on the throne at a time when the Portuguese under the renegade governor João Correia de Sousa was threatening the country, the royal council elected the Duke of Mbamba as King Pedro II. This ushered in the short-lived royal House of Nsundi. King Pedro II was peacefully succeeded by his son Garcia I but the calm was not to last. In 1626, Garcia was overthrown by disgruntled nobles led by Manuel Jordão the Duke of Nsundi. At the request of the royal ladies of the court, many of whom fervent partisans of the House of Kwilu, Jordão had Ambrósio crowned as king restoring the Kwilu kanda to power.

== Reign as King ==
King Ambrósio fell out with his benefactor after two years and accused him of eyeing the throne. The king quickly moved to and succeeded at removing Jordão from his post as Duke of Nsundi, having him exiled to an island on the Congo River. This would not be the end of Ambrósio's troubles, as his reign was beset by rumors of conspiracy and war mobilizations which culminated in a massive revolt. King Ambrósio I was overthrown and killed on March 7, 1631.

== See also ==
- List of rulers of Kongo
- Kingdom of Kongo
- House of Kwilu

Preceded by Garcia I	Manikongo; 1624–1631	Succeeded by Álvaro IV
