= Álvaro I of Kongo =

Álvaro I
- Mwene Kongo
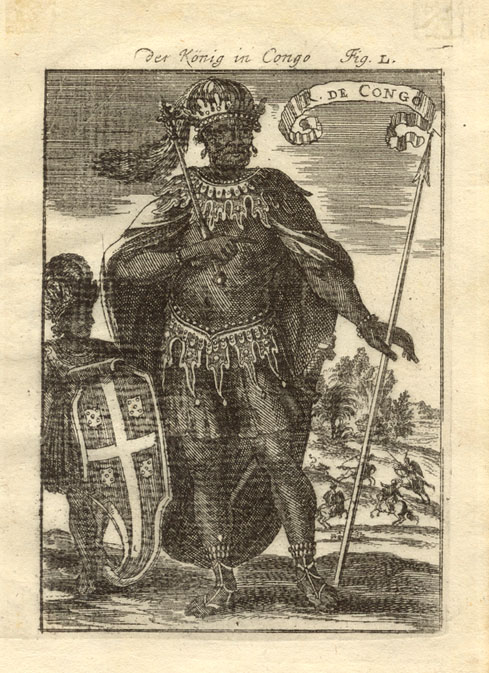
- Reign: 1568 to 1587
- Predecessor: Henrique I
- Successor: Álvaro II
- Dynasty: Kwilu dynasty

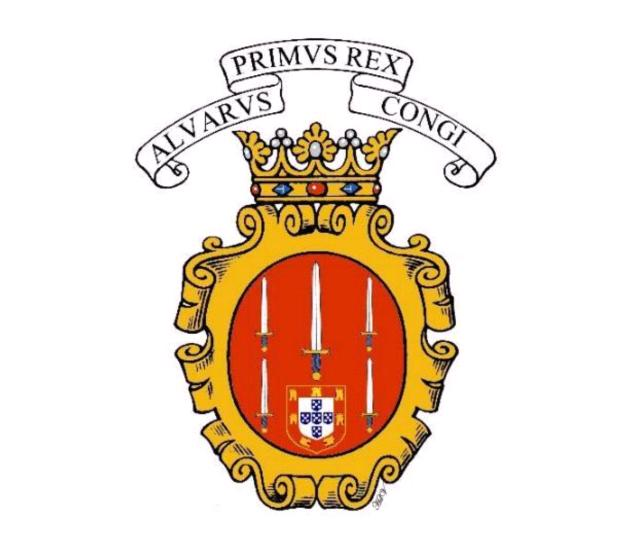
The coat of arms issued to King Álvaro I in 1578

Álvaro I Nimi a Lukeni lua Mvemba was a Manikongo (Mwene Kongo), or king of Kongo, from 1568 to 1587, and the founder of the Kwilu dynasty.

== Biography ==
Álvaro's father was an unknown Kongo nobleman who died, leaving his mother to remarry to King Henrique I. When Henrique I died fighting on the eastern frontier, he had left Álvaro as his regent. According to Duarte Lopes, Kongo's ambassador to Rome in 1584-88, Álvaro had taken up the kingship by common consent. However, there do appear to have been others who wished to be king, and some scholars, notably Francois Bontinck, proposed that Álvaro's rule was seen as an usurpation. The invasion of the Jagas, which took place shortly after Álvaro became king, is sometimes seen as a protest against this usurpation. Other scholars, however, doubt the connection between the Jaga invasion and a dynastic crisis.

The Jagas, however, did create a major problem for Álvaro, who had to abandon the capital of Mbanza Kongo, and flee to an island in the Congo River. From that place, he sought help from Portugal to restore him to the throne and expel the Jagas. Portugal responded by sending an expedition of 600 soldiers, mostly from the colony of São Tome, under the command of Francisco de Gouveia Sottomaior. Gouveia Sottomaior's instructions included obtaining some sort of vassalage from Álvaro and regaining control of the Portuguese community in Kongo by building a fort to "protect" them. However that might be, strong opposition by the Portuguese in Kongo, led by Álvaro's confessor, Francisco Barbuda, prevented most of Gouveia Sottomaior's instructions from being carried out.

Nonetheless, Álvaro apparently did permit the Portuguese to settle in Luanda and the colony of Angola was born when Paulo Dias de Novais arrived with his force in 1575. Álvaro sought to relieve the potential threat to his sovereignty by assisting Dias de Novais, sending troops to help him in 1577. However, he, or at the very least Francisco Barbuda, was instrumental in persuading the king of Ndongo, where Dias de Novais had his principal forces, to drive the Portuguese out. Once this had happened, however, Álvaro sent an army to Angola to assist the Portuguese and to conquer Ndongo. The conquest failed, however, as the Kongo army was overextended and could not cross the Bengo River successfully.

Álvaro sought to Europeanize Kongo more fully than had been the case before. He was the first king to refer to the capital city as São Salvador. He also sought to obtain a bishop from Rome, though it was not until the reign of his son Álvaro II of Kongo that this was accomplished.

Álvaro I continued the Order of Christ in 1607 after the Portuguese brought the Order of Christ to the Kingdom of Kongo; many knighthoods in the Order of Christ were thus granted to Kongolese citizens.

In 1587, he was succeeded by his son Álvaro II.

== See also ==
- Jagas
- Kingdom of Kongo
- List of rulers of Kongo

Preceded by Henrique I	Manikongo; 1568–1587	Succeeded by Álvaro II
