= Henrique of Kongo =

Henrique of Kongo may refer to:

- Henrique of Kongo (bishop) (1495–1531)
- Henrique I of Kongo, king (r. 1567–1568)
- Henrique II of Kongo, king (r. 1794–1803)
- Henrique III of Kongo, king (r. 1842–1857)
