= Bernardo II of Kongo =

Bernardo II
- Mwene Kongo
- Reign: 1614 to 1615
- Predecessor: Álvaro II
- Successor: Álvaro III
- Dynasty: Kwilu dynasty
- Father: Álvaro II

Bernardo II Nimi a Nkanga was a manikongo of the Kingdom of Kongo who ruled from 12 August 1614 until August 1615. He was the son of King Álvaro II. Like the last two kings of Kongo, Bernardo II belonged to the Kwilu kanda or royal House of Kwilu.

== See also ==
- List of rulers of Kongo
- Kingdom of Kongo

Preceded by Álvaro II	Manikongo; 1614–1615	Succeeded by Álvaro III
