= Álvaro III of Kongo =

Álvaro III
- Mwene Kongo
- Reign: August 1615 to 4 May 1622
- Predecessor: Bernardo II
- Successor: Pedro II
- Dynasty: Kwilu dynasty
- Father: Álvaro II

Álvaro III Nimi a Mpanzu, also known as Álvaro III Mbiki a Mpanzu, ruled as king or manikongo of the Kingdom of Kongo from August 1615 to 4 May 1622. Prior to becoming king, he had served as Duke of Mbamba. Like his predecessor, Bernardo II he was a son of King Álvaro II. King Álvaro III was the fourth ruler from the royal house of Kwilu established by King Álvaro I. In 1622, Álvaro III died while his son, Álvaro, was too young to become king. The nobles elected the Duke of Mbamba to the post of mwenekongo, ushering the short dynasty of the House of Nsundi.

== Reign ==
Alvaro III formalized the construction of a Jesuit college in Sao Salvador around 1619. In the 1610s, Dutch–Kongo relations soured after the King enforced the closure of a Dutch factory in Soyo. Kongo would revive relations with the Dutch once more during his reign as a means to check Portuguese expansionism in the region. Dutch factories were reopened at Soyo in 1621.

== See also ==
- List of rulers of Kongo
- Kingdom of Kongo
- House of Kwilu

Preceded by Bernardo II	Manikongo; 1615–1622	Succeeded by Pedro II
