= Catholic Church in Kongo =

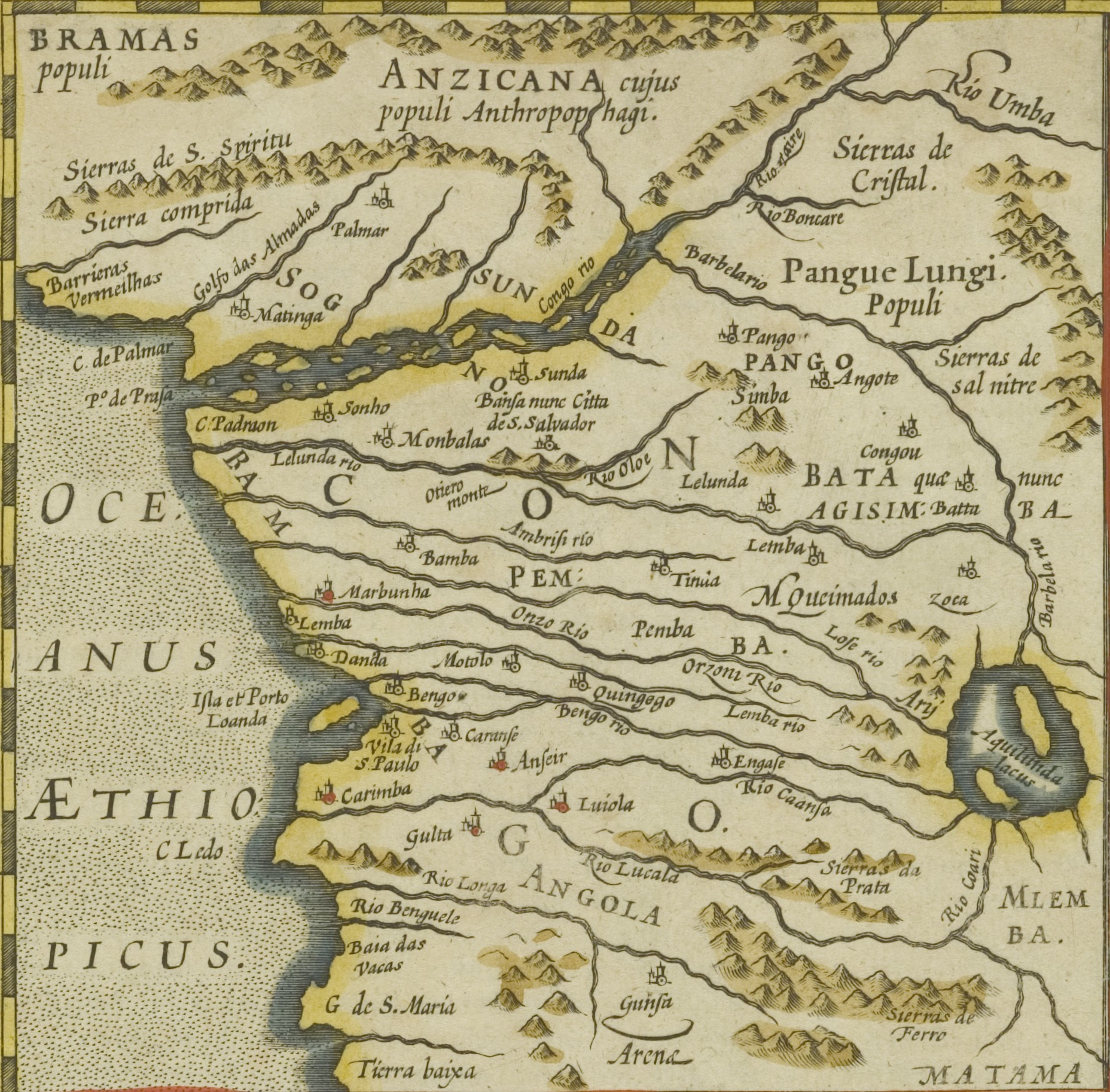
The Kingdom of Congo

The Catholic Church arrived in the Kingdom of Kongo shortly after the first Portuguese explorers reached its shores in 1483. The Portuguese left several of their own number and kidnapped a group of Kongo including at least one nobleman, Kala ka Mfusu, taking them to Portugal where they stayed a year, learned Portuguese and were converted to Christianity. The group was returned to Kongo in 1485 and Kala ka Mfusu led a royal mission from Kongo's manikongo, Nzinga a Nkuwu to Portugal. Following their arrival in late 1486 the embassy stayed nearly four years in Lisbon with the monks of Saint John the Baptist. There they studied Christianity and Portuguese with Vicente dos Anjos (who also learned to speak Kikongo), and began the start of a Kongolese version of Christianity.

The mission returned to Kongo in early 1491, although Kala ka Mfusu died on the return trip. The provincial ruler of Soyo on the Atlantic coast received them and was the first to be baptized. They moved to the royal capital in April and May and Manikongo Nzinga a Nkuwu was baptized on 3 May 1491, taking the name João in honor of the Portuguese king, (João II). Many of his officials and nobles were subsequently baptized. While initially reluctant to allow the baptism of women, his wife, Nzinga a Nlaza, protested and eventually won him over; she was subsequently baptized as Queen Leonor of Kongo and became a champion of the church, paying expenses from her own income.

Further missionaries arrived at the court of Nzinga a Nkuwu, beginning in 1508 and a good number also accompanied his son Afonso Mvemba a Nzinga to his provincial post of Nsundi. Afonso, in turn became a great champion of the faith, even though, according to Afonso's subsequent account of the events, his father cooled in the faith and many of the Kongolese who had been baptized turned away.

== Reign of King Afonso ==
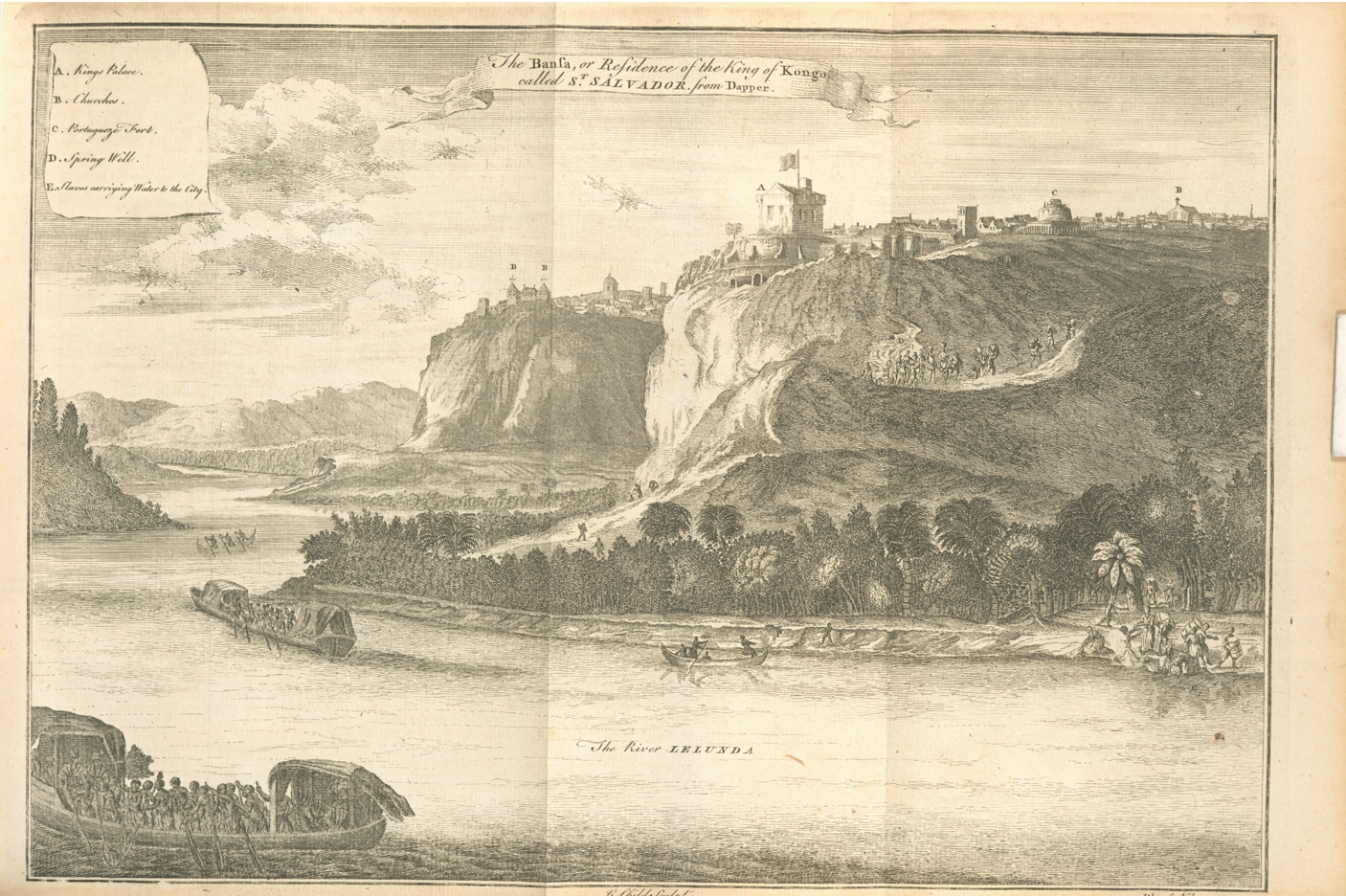
The capital of the Manikongo, São Salvador

Afonso, whose letters are largely the sole source for the following events of his reign, presented himself to the world as a fervent Catholic, anxious to spread the faith, and also as having suffered persecution for it during the last years of his father's reign. When João died, probably in late 1506 or 1507, Afonso's half brother Mpanzu a Kitima, one of the lapsed Christians and a powerful rival, challenged the prince for the throne. But Afonso was able to overcome his brother in battle, thanks to having already positioned himself in the capital São Salvador and, according to Afonso's account the supernatural appearance of Saint James the Great in the sky, frightening his enemies. In subsequent correspondence with Portugal, Afonso decided to create a coat of arms in which five armed hands, each bearing a sword, was the principal element, along with a broken idol figured prominently. This coat of arms, first described in 1512, became one of Kongo's central icons, while Saint James Major's feast day became Kongo most important holiday, simultaneously honoring the saint who was popular in Iberian armies as a crusading saint, and King Afonso and his miracle.

Having become king, Afonso set about establishing a church. In letters to Portugal, he described some of the steps: he declared it illegal for people to worship idols, he destroyed a "house of idols" located in the capital (against the threat of a revolt), he also provided for a tithe to support it financially. Tradition from the late 17th century onward regarded Afonso as the founder of the church, and also attributes the story that he buried his own mother alive "for the sake of the Savior King" when she refused to take off a small idol she wore around her neck. Afonso's work to establish the church won him wide praise outside of Africa, and the Portuguese historian João de Barros called him the "Apostle of Congo" in 1552.

Afonso also worked to create a specifically local interpretation of Christianity, although the details are not well known. He worked with a number of Portuguese priests, most notably Rui d'Aguiar who came in 1516, and also with Kongolese who were educated in Europe, principally his son Henrique Kinu a Mvemba, who was elevated to the status of bishop in 1518, and who worked in Kongo from 1521 until his death in 1531.

== Religious syncretism ==
The Church that Afonso created was not simply a copy or extension of the Portuguese church, but from the very beginning included elements of Kongo theology. For example, the Kongos probably believed that most of the denizens of the Other World were the souls of deceased ancestors, and not gods who had never lived on earth or had a material existence. Thus, the catechism described the Holy Trinity as "three people" (antu a tatu). Priests were called by the same name as the previous clergy (nganga), and the term ukisi, an abstract noun from the same root that gives the word nkisi (typically used to describe a charm, or in 16th century parlance, an "idol") was used to translate holy.

In fact, key religious terms such as God, holy, and spirit were rendered in Kikongo terms taken directly from Kongo cosmology (Nzambi Mpungu for God, nkisi for holy and moyo for spirit or soul). This in turn, made conversion easier, as self-identification requires only a simple declaration of faith.

In this way, the Bible was called nkanda ukisi which might also be rendered as "charm in the form of a book", and a church was called nzo a ukisi or "charm in the form of a building". In this way, Catholic saints were identified with local spiritual entities, and churches built in holy spots. This theology, developed by Afonso and a team of his colleagues, working with Portuguese priests, defined the way in which Kongolese approached the new religion and in many ways naturalized it.

== Maturation of the Church ==
Although Afonso is often credited with creating and establishing the church, it is probably his grandson and successor Diogo I Nkumbi a Mpudi who really placed the church on solid ground. Under Diogo, a lay organization of teachers first grew up to support and supplement the always meager number of ordained priests. Diogo also had the services of some of the earliest missionaries of the Jesuit Order, who worked in Kongo from 1548 to 1555. Diogo worked smoothly with the Jesuits when they first came, but as the Jesuits demanded more respect and worked at times against Diogo's political interests, he became disillusioned. Their mutually antagonistic correspondence with Portugal during this period has sometimes contributed to Diogo enjoying a reputation as a weak or uninterested Christian, though the events of his reign suggest that such a reputation was probably undeserved. Not only did Diogo arrange for the church to reach into the rural areas of the country, but he actively supported missionary work to the north (into the kingdom of Loango and south into Matamba, and he supported Jesuit work in Ndongo as well.

At the same time, as the church grew stronger, the King of Portugal decided to take greater control of it. He formalized his attempt to exercise control over Kongo's church by having the Pope place Kongo under the control of the newly created bishop of São Tomé in 1534. Many years elapsed between the formal subordination of Kongo to São Tomé and the first actual attempt of the bishop to exercise real control. When he did in the 1540, Diogo refused to allow the bishop to dismiss his personal confessor, Manuel Afonso. However, thanks to the mission of Antonio Vieira, a Kongo nobleman to Lisbon, and Duarte Lopes, a Portuguese representing Kongo visited Rome, the Pope granted Kongo its own bishop in 1596, with the church of Sao Salvador to be its cathedral. Portugal claimed the right of patronage over the new diocese, however and sought to use their control of the bishop to assert their own interests in Kongo, which were linked to the new Portuguese colony of Angola, founded in 1575. After many quarrels between the kings and bishops, in 1624 the bishop, moved, permanently, to Luanda and stopped ordaining new Kongo clergy.

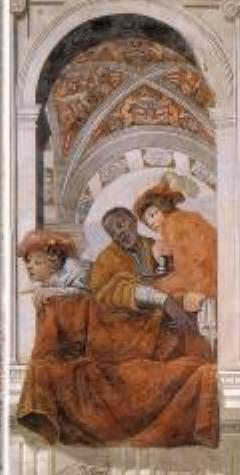
Painting of Emanuele Ne Vunda, Palazzo del Quirinale, Rome, 1615–1616.

Diogo and the kings that followed established a strong laity, into whose hands the job of education typically fell, while the small numbers of ordained clergy only performed the sacraments. This pattern, so visible in later Kongo history, was probably already present in the late 16th century. The lay ministers were typically designated as teachers (mestres, lit. 'masters' in Portuguese), were drawn from the nobility of Kongo, paid salaries by the state, and engaged both in teaching literacy, religious education, and often also secretarial duties. The personal papers of Emanuele Ne Vunda reveal the workings of laymen's positions. When given charge of the church of the Trinity in Soyo, he was paid a portion of the fees that were paid for his services, including fees charged in burials. When he was made mestre of the province of Mpemba, he was paid a salary of 6 lefuku of nzimbu shells a month, and also performed duties as a secretary. (One lefuku was equal to 10,000 nzimbu shells.)

In 1604 King Álvaro II sent Ne Vunda as an ambassador to the Vatican. After travelling through Brazil and Spain he reached Rome on 3 January 1608, but died two days later of illness.

We have very little information about the numbers or lives of these mestres though they were very important in the day-to-day life of the church. Their activities explain how the ordinary Kongolese managed to retain their version of Christianity even in the absence of ordained clergy. The certainly worked closely with the secular clergy of the country, and are often mentioned by the missionaries of the regular orders (primarily Jesuit and Capuchin) who visited and worked in Kongo in the seventeenth and eighteenth centuries.

== Role of regular clergy ==
The regular clergy (monks and teaching orders) had an important role to play in the development of Kongo's version of Christianity. Jesuit missionaries had a brief presence in 16th century Kongo (1548–1555), but political issues between them and King Diogo I brought the mission to an end.

A Discalced Carmelite mission worked in Kongo from 1584 to 1588 and Dominicans also had a brief mission in 1610–1612. However, it was the renewed Jesuit mission and the Capuchin mission that marked the real presence of regular orders in Kongo.

The Jesuits returned to Kongo in 1619, and in 1625 opened the college of São Salvador, which was responsible for the education of most of the Kongo elite in the mid 17th century. João de Paiva, the rector of the college until 1642, was particularly instrumental in the education of Kongolese, and also wrote an extensive, though now lost, chronicle of the country. Some of de Paiva's material informed the Synopsis Annalium of António Franco (1725). Jesuits also organized lay brotherhoods which played an important role in politics.

The Jesuits were followed in 1645 by the Capuchins. Capuchins came to Kongo largely because Kongo kings, beginning with Álvaro II of Kongo, were dissatisfied with the failure of the bishops to ordain sufficient clergy and the Portuguese crown's opposition to the ordination of Kongolese. Kongo demanded that its church be separated from that of Portugal and that Angolan interests from the rival and increasingly enemy colony that often controlled the episcopal office. As a compromise, the Papacy decided to send Italian Capuchins from areas that were not objectionable to Portugal to Kongo. Although officially missionaries, the Capuchins were as much like parish priests as missionaries to the unconverted. In fact, this parish priest role put them frequently at odds with the secular clergy, who Capuchins charged were lax in their duties and too tolerant of traditional Kongolese religion.

The Capuchins generally had three or four missionaries in the whole of Kongo, occasionally they had as many as ten, never enough to truly take over the instruction of the people or educate more than an elite of political actors and their own staff. The Capuchins generally constructed hospices near political centers, such as São Salvador, Mbamba, and Soyo or in territory relatively far from the political centers such as the hospice at Nsuku in the north of the country. There they and their staff of freed slaves (nleke) who carried them on their annual rounds of the countryside. While travelling they stopped at centrally located villages for a few days while people from neighboring settlements came in, and then they performed the sacraments, especially baptism, to thousands. It was not uncommon for a long serving missionary to record tens of thousands of baptisms in their reports, and many fewer marriages and communions.

The Capuchins' special role in Europe, the Americas and Africa was to purify the religious practice of rural communities, and in Kongo they were particularly keen to destroy what they considered "superstitious" in Kongolese religion, which included the making of charms (minkisi) and healing cults like the kimpasi. As such they were imbued with the spirit of the Counter Reformation and hostile to many local practices, both in Europe and in Africa. Although some regarded Kongo as a devoutly Christian nation and were more tolerant of local custom, many wrote harsh denunciations of local practice. So much so that Axelsen portrayed their relations with the Kongo as something akin to a war until the mid-eighteenth century, when dwindling numbers of foreign clergy allowed the local religious actors to reassert themselves. Because of this literature, many scholars have argued that Kongo did not really accept Christianity, or simply masked their true beliefs behind show conversion. However, the missionary reports strongly suggest a syncretic understanding of Christianity on the part of the Kongo rural poor as well as the nobles, in which some elements of the former religion and many more of its cosmology informed Christian practice.

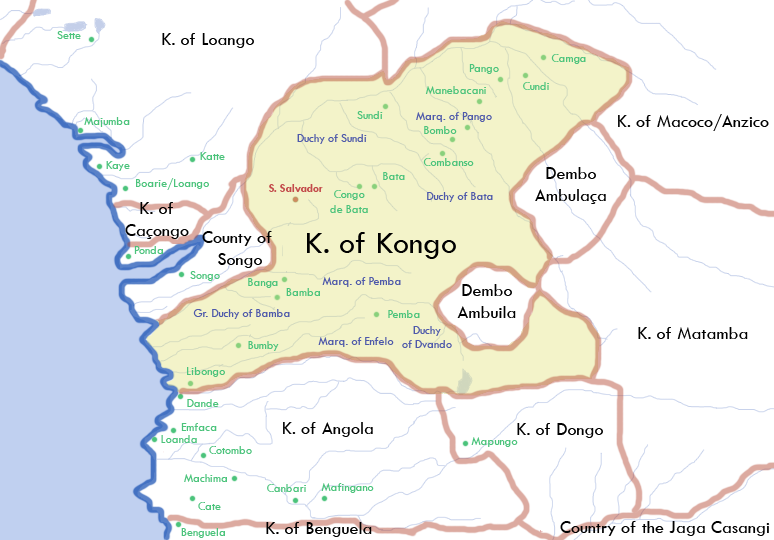
Kongo in 1711

The Capuchin missionaries left very long accounts of Kongo, some of which are the best sources available to us today. Giovanni Francesco da Roma (1648), Antonio de Teruel (1664), Girolamo da Montesarchio (1668), Girolamo Merolla da Sorrento (1688), Luca da Caltanisetta (1701), Marcellino d'Atri (1702), Antonio Zucchelli da Gradisca (1712), Bernardo da Gallo (1710), Lorenzo da Lucca (1718), Cherubino da Savona (1775) and Raimondo da Dicomano (1798) among others, all left lengthy accounts full of details of daily life, political events, and religious observations. Finally, Giovanni Antonio Cavazzi da Montecuccolo, whose long book of 1687 was often quoted, cited and translated became one of the fundamental sources for Central African history, and his illustrations, both in the unpublished Araldi manuscript (in Modena) and as engravings in his book are important sources for daily life.

After the first two decades of the 18th century, fewer Capuchins came to Kongo, and Portuguese policies, which restricted the ability of Capuchins to enter Angola and Kongo, hampered the 18th century mission as well. For most of the mid-18th century there was only one missionary in the country, and by the end of the century, there were many years with no Capuchins. The Capuchins finally left Central Africa altogether in 1835, and by then they had not had a missionary in Kongo since 1814.

== The Antonian Movement ==
Kongo's long civil war, occasioned by their defeat at the Battle of Mbwila (1665) and the political crisis that followed led to a crisis in society and the church. The breakdown of order as no one king was able to establish authority over the whole country in the aftermath of the death of Antonio I at the battle, and the abandonment of the capital following its sack in 1678, resulted in the unofficial partitioning of the country into hostile camps led by rival kings and entrenched in the mountains of Mbula and Kibangu or the coastal province of Luvota. Their incessant wars led to population dislocation, food shortages, and an increase in the slave trade. In addition, the attitude of the Capuchins toward the Kongo elite, and toward the long established practices of the country galled many people.

In this atmosphere of crisis, a new spirit of religious fervor arose in the preaching of Beatriz Kimpa Vita, who claimed to be possessed by Saint Anthony of Padua in 1704. Beatriz preached that all the kings had to reunite at the ancient and then abandoned capital of São Salvador to restore the kingdom. She also introduced new elements to religion that she claimed she had from God himself during weekly sojourns in Heaven. Among them were that Jesus had been born in Kongo and was a Kongolese as were his mother and Saint Anthony. She taught that the sacraments of the church were unnecessary for salvation, that the intention of the believer was all that was necessary. While some thought this might have been Protestant influence, it is likely that it derived from long held local concepts of religion.

Beatriz preached at the camps of several of the kings and sent her followers to the others, eventually settling in São Salvador and taking up residence in the ruined cathedral. Shortly after this she became pregnant and was arrested by forces to Pedro IV, one of the pretenders. He put her on trial for witchcraft and had her burned at the stake on 2 July 1706.

While Pedro was able to restore the kingdom and reoccupy Sāo Salvador, without much effective resistance from the Antonians, some of Beatriz's ideas, including the idea that Jesus was from Kongo remained. Brass crucifixes produced in Kongo in the eighteenth and nineteenth century frequently depict Jesus as an African and wearing clothing decorated in designs popular in the country.

== Christian Kongo Art ==
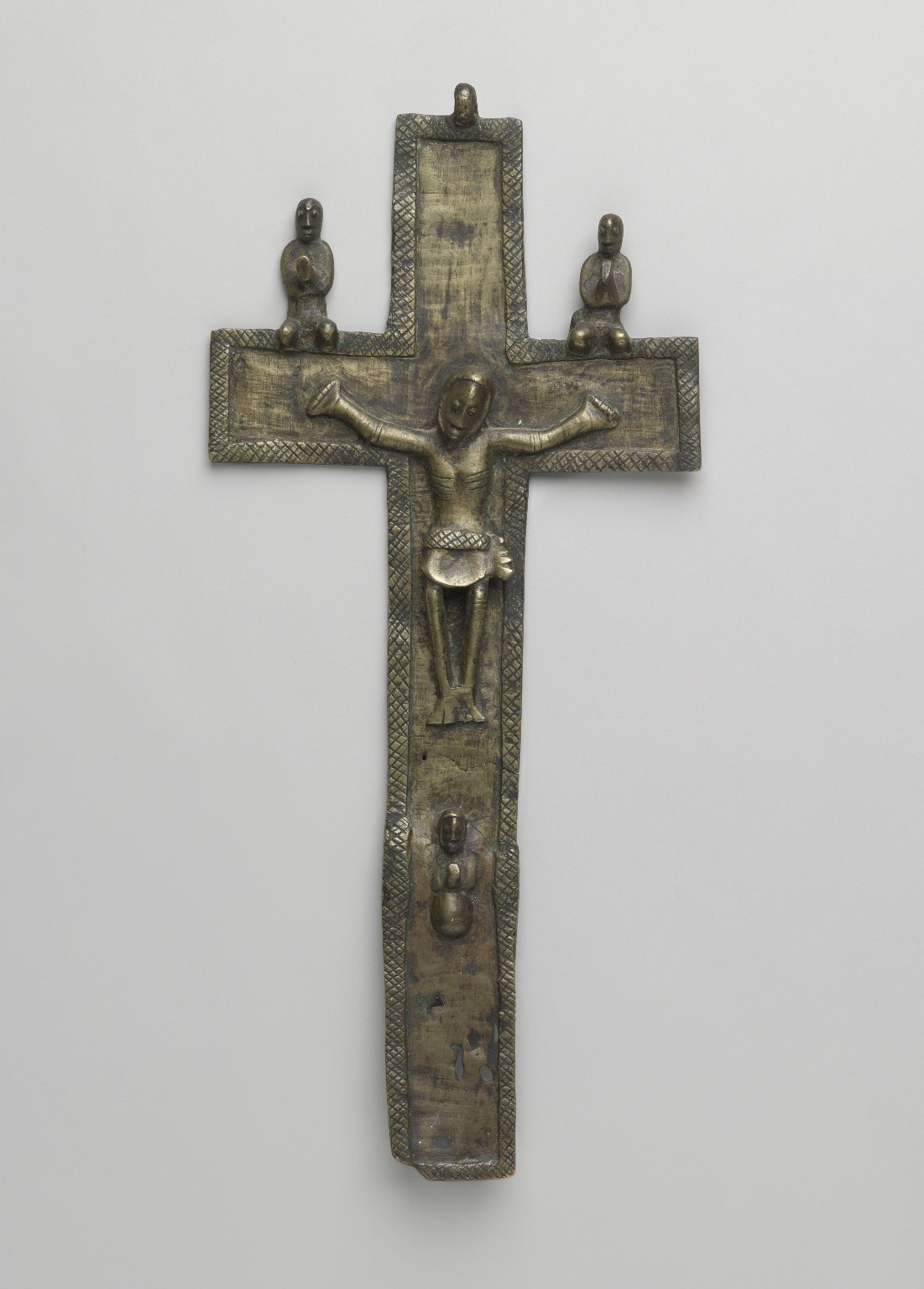
Crucifix (Nkangi Kiditu), from the collection of the Brooklyn Museum

The cross, a primary emblem of Christian ritual, was also a fundamental motif at the core of Kongo belief systems. The Kongo cosmogram, also called the Four Moments of the Sun, is a circle around a cross. It depicts the four divisions of the day—dawn, noon, dusk, and midnight—which represents the cyclical journey of a human life from birth to the afterlife of the ancestors. Considered an emblem of spiritual authority and power, the Christian cross was integrated into Kongo ancestral cults and burial rituals, and was believed to contain magical protective properties. In Kongo culture, crosses were believed to intervene in matters ranging from illness and fertility to rainfall.

Fifteenth-century Kongo Christian religious art objects are closely modeled on European prototypes. They were usually cast in an open mold using metal obtained from brass units of currency known as manillas, imported from Europe.

In typical crucifixes, Christ's facial features are reduced to stylized abbreviations that are less detailed in their descriptiveness. His hands and feet are flattened and the feet are joined into a single five-toed limb, which, according to interpretations of Kongo gestures, affords heightened spiritual power. The wrap and ribs are rendered as simplified to geometric linear abstractions. Christ is depicted with large protruding oval eyes, a common motif in Kongo art representing the supernatural vision of a human who is possessed by an ancestor or deity. Below Christ and above his shoulders are often small, highly stylized praying figures. Their role and identities are unknown, but they may be mourners or ancestors.

== Atlantic Slave Trade ==
The conversion of the Bakongo to Catholicism began a long, diplomatic relationship between Kongo and Portugal, which culminated in the Atlantic Slave Trade. The presence of the Catholic Church in Kongo, from the 16th century onwards, helped provide documentation on Kongo's involvement in the slave trade. With the growth of the slave trade, slaves became a major commodity in Kongo's economy. Slaves were used to pay for imported goods and services, such as weapons, cloth, and catholic training. They could even be given as diplomatic gifts. Initially, most exported slaves were foreign war captives. However, when the wars of expansion ceased in the early 17th century, the supply of foreign slaves also ended. Thus, the Kongo Kings and nobles began turning to freeborn Kongos as a commodity. By the mid-1600s, Kongos guilty of crimes such as theft, slander, treason, rebellion, desertion, adultery, and witchcraft could be condemned to perpetual slavery and sold to Europeans. Furthermore, from the late 17th century onwards, the Kingdom of Kongo experienced waves of civil conflict, which divided the country amongst rival contenders. These civil wars would continue, off and on, into the 19th century, providing the Americas with Central African slaves. As a result, many Bakongo slaves brought to the Americas were Catholic and Portuguese speakers.

== Bibliography ==
- Heywood, Linda; Thornton, John (2007). Central Africans, Atlantic Creoles, and the Foundation of the Americas, 1585–1660. Cambridge, England: Cambridge University Press – via Google Books.
- Saccardo, Graziano (1982–83). Congo e Angola con la storia dell'antica missione dei Cappuccini (3 vols)) (in Italian). Venice: Curia provinciale dei Cappuccini.
- Thornton, John (1983). The Kingdom of Kongo: Civil War and Transition, 1641-1718. Madison, Wisconsin: University of Wisconsin Press. ISBN 978-0299092900.
- Thornton, John (1984). "The Development of an African Catholic Church in the Kingdom of Kongo, 1491-1750". Journal of African History. Vol. 25, no. 2. Cambridge University Press. pp. 147–167.
- Thornton, John (1998). The Kongolese Saint Anthony: Dona Beatriz Kimpa Vita and the Antonian Movement, 1684-1706. Cambridge and New York: Cambridge University Press. ISBN 9780521596497.
- Fromont, Cécile (2014-12-19). The Art of Conversion: Christian Visual Culture in the Kingdom of Kongo. UNC Press Books. p. 28. ISBN 9781469618722.
