= Laboratório Nacional de Engenharia Civil =

Portuguese research laboratory

Coordinates: 38°45′29″N 9°08′33″W

The Laboratório Nacional de Engenharia Civil, English: National Laboratory for Civil Engineering, known as LNEC, is a Portuguese public institution of scientific and technological research and development and is a civil engineering laboratory.

LNEC operates in the different fields of civil engineering under the jurisdiction of the Ministry of Economy, in cooperation with the Ministry of Education and Science in the definition of its strategic guidelines, as established in its Organic Law.

== History ==
LNEC was founded on November 19, 1946, from the Laboratory for Materials Testing and Study of the Ministry of Public Works and the Center for Civil Engineering Studies, based at the Instituto Superior Técnico. This double-strand, research and experimentation, would decisively shape the future development of LNEC.

On June 20, 1987, LNEC was made Honorary Member of the Military Order of Saint James of the Sword and on November 19, 1987, was made Honorary Member of the Military Order of Christ.

LNEC carries out research activities in the following fields: public works, housing, urban planning, environment, water resources, estuaries, coastal areas, transportation and communication networks, materials industry, building components and other products. The main purpose of these activities is to contribute to:

- the quality and safety of works;
- the protection and rehabilitation of the natural and built patrimony;
- the technological modernisation and innovation in the building sector;
- the minimisation of natural and technological hazards;
- the development of natural resources from a viewpoint of sustainable development.

Those activities are as follows:

- Planned research of a strategic nature, developed within research lines considered as priority due to their relevance for the country.
- Studies and expert reports under contract: advanced expert advisory services to public and private bodies, both national and foreign.
- Promotion of quality in construction: preparation of specifications, norms and regulations, approval and classification of new building materials and components, observation of the performance of works, certification of building projects by LNEC "Quality Mark" and normal tests.
- Dissemination of knowledge, as well as technical and scientific training: preparation of scientific and technical documents, organisation of technical courses or other training actions, organisation of scientific and technical meetings, both national and foreign, complemented by the publishing activity and by the Library.
- Cooperation with other bodies: activities of co-operation with various Portuguese and foreign bodies, namely with associations of a scientific and technical character, universities, laboratories and other institutions.
