= Pedro II of Kongo =

Pedro II
- Mwene Kongo
- Reign: 26 May 1622 – 3 April 1624
- Predecessor: Álvaro III
- Successor: Garcia I
- Dynasty: House of Nsundi

Pedro II Nkanga a Mvika (Nkanga a Mbika lua Ntumba a Mwemba in Kikongo and D. Pedro II Afonso in Portuguese) was born around 1575 and died on April 13, 1624. He is a descendant of King Alfonso I of Kongo on his mother's side and reigned from 1622 to 1624. He is the first king of the Kongo kingdom of the Kanda Nkanga lineage in Mvika or Kinkanga known as the House of Nsundi. Pedro II was a ruler of the Kingdom of Kongo during the kingdom's first conflict with the Portuguese. He was succeeded by his son Garcia I, who was crowned in 1624.

== Career ==
Pedro II served in the provincial government of Manikongo Álvaro III Nimi a Mpanzu as Marquis of Wembo and later as Duke of Mbamba. Manikongo Álvaro III had no heir apparent as he was a young man with older uncles who wished to rule. When he died in 1622, Pedro II was elected as a compromise candidate. King Pedro II's father was from the province of Nsundi, where Pedro himself was born, and thus his royal house is known by that name or simply the Kinkanga kanda.

Pedro was widely regarded as a virtuous man and a model Christian. The Jesuits, who had recently arrived in Kongo held him up as a paragon of Christian deportment.

== War with Angola ==
No sooner had he come to the throne than the governor of Angola, João Correia de Sousa, sent an army into Kongo claiming that he had the right to choose the mwenekongo. Besides that, Sousa accused Pedro of harboring runaway slaves from Angola during his tenure as Duke of Mbamba.

=== Battle of Mbumbi ===
Fresh from a victory against Nambu a Ngongo, a southern neighbor of Kongo, a 20,000 strong Portuguese army with its Imbangala allies entered Mbamba and was met by the Duke at Mbumbi. Although the Duke's men fought bravely and scattered a portion of the Portuguese army, he was badly outnumbered having only his own small force and that of the Marquis of Mpemba who managed to join him. The Portuguese defeated and killed both nobles. They were later eaten by Portugal's Imbangala troops.

=== Battle of Mbandi Kasi ===
Pedro II immediately declared Angola an enemy of the state and brought the main army down from Kongo to meet the invaders at Mbanda Kasi. The army of Kongo crushed the Portuguese and the Imbangala and forced them out of Kongo entirely. In the aftermath of this, anti-Portuguese riots broke out all over the kingdom and threatened its long established merchant community. Portuguese throughout the country were humiliatingly disarmed and even forced to give up their clothes.

Pedro II set up camp at Mbana Kasi and wrote numerous letters of protest to Rome and the king of Spain (then also the ruler of Portugal). As a result of these letters and protests by Portuguese merchants in Kongo and Angola, João Correia de Sousa was recalled in disgrace, and some 1,200 slaves were eventually returned from Brazil. Pedro, anxious not to alienate the Portuguese merchant community, and aware that they had generally remained loyal during the war, did as much as he could to preserve their lives and property, leading some of his detractors to call him "King of Portuguese".

== Birth of the Dutch Alliance ==
Pedro also wrote to the Dutch States General proposing that the newly formed West India Company assist him in an attack on Luanda, with the BaKongo attacking by land and the Dutch by sea. Although he died before this alliance could be affected, the steady alliance between Kongo and the Netherlands would persist, eventually coming to fruition in 1641 with the Dutch attack on Luanda.

== See also ==
- List of rulers of Kongo
- History of Angola
- Angolan Wars

Preceded by Álvaro III	Manikongo; 1622–1624	Succeeded by Garcia I
