= Henrique of Kongo (bishop) =

His Excellency Henrique Kinu a Mvemba
- Bishop of Utica
- Church: Roman Catholic Church
- Diocese: Utica
- Installed: 5 May 1518
- Term ended: 1531

Orders
- Consecration: by Pope Leo X

Personal details
- Born: 1495 Nsundi
- Died: 1531 (aged 35/36) Kingdom of Kongo
- Parents: Afonso I
- Occupation: Governor of Mpangu
- Education: University of Coimbra
- Coat of arms

Henrique (born Henrique Kinu a Mvemba; 1495 - 1531) was a Kongolese Catholic prelate, a prince of Kongo and a son of Afonso I. He became a Catholic priest shortly after the Christianization of the kingdom and dedicated his life to the catechism of the Kongolese, being appointed in 1518 titular bishop of Utica, in present-day Tunisia. He was the first Central African bishop in history.

== History ==
According to the work of Filippo Pigafetta, The Kingdom of the Kongo and the Surrounding Regions (1591); written from the notes of Duarte Lopes, Henrique was born in Nsundi in 1495, being the son of Afonso I who was acclaimed King of the Kongo in 1509. Shortly afterwards the king sent many of his children and other nobles to study in Coimbra, Portugal to aid him in modernizing the kingdom. Among those sent included his own son Henrique, who was sponsored by the king Dom Manuel I, himself.

On May 5, 1518, at the age of 24, the prince was elevated by Pope Leo X in Rome as Bishop of Utica, in present-day Tunisia, thus Henrique of Kongo was the first known bishop from central Africa in history. (Of course, the first black African bishops date from ancient Nubia and Axum during the first centuries of Christianity.) However, he never received the bishopric since it was only titular, as Tunisia at the time was dominated by Muslims.

In 1521 he returned to Kongo and was appointed governor of Mpangu, a province of the Kingdom. He would continue to serve in the Christianization of the kingdom until his death 10 years later.
