= Álvaro II of Kongo =

King of Kongo (1587–1614)

Álvaro II
- Mwene Kongo
- Reign: 1587 to 1614
- Predecessor: Álvaro I
- Successor: Bernardo II
- Dynasty: Kwilu dynasty
- Father: Álvaro I

Álvaro II Nimi a Nkanga was king of Kongo from 1587 to 1614. He was one of Kongo's most powerful and important kings, who succeeded his father Álvaro I, but not until resolving a dispute with his brother. Both sides brought armies to M'banza-Kongo (São Salvador) but to avoid bloodshed they agreed to single combat, won by Álvaro.

Álvaro faced serious problems with other nobles besides his brother, and in 1590–91 was racked by a serious, though poorly documented civil war. In order to reestablish his authority, Álvaro had to accept the virtual independence of Miguel, the count of Soyo. In order to recognize those nobles who had been loyal to him during this struggle, Álvaro began granting habits of the Order of Christ to his followers. Kongo kings continued this order in the Kingdom of Kongo (see Order of Christ (Kongo)) and granted knighthoods in it through the 19th century, which continues by pretenders to the throne.

During Álvaro's reign, the capital city, M'banza-Kongo was recognized as the capital of the diocese of then Portuguese Congo and Angola, and the first bishop was appointed, in 1596. However, because the kings of Portugal claimed the right of Padroado (patronage), they chose their own bishop. Constant struggles between the king and the bishop followed.

Kongo's relations with Portuguese Angola worsened during Álvaro's reign, and he complained bitterly about the behaviour of the governors to the King of Spain (then also ruling Portugal during the period of the Iberian Union).

In 1604–1608, Alvaro II sent an ambassador to Pope Paul V in the person of Emanuele Ne Vunda.

== See also ==
- List of rulers of Kongo
- Kingdom of Kongo
- House of Kwilu

Preceded by Álvaro I	Manikongo; 1587–1614	Succeeded by Bernardo II
