= Francisco I of Kongo =

Francisco I
- Mwene Kongo

King of Kongo
- Reign: 1545
- Predecessor: Pedro I
- Successor: Diogo I
- Born: 1500
- Died: 1545 (aged 44/45)
- Dynasty: Lukeni kanda
- Father: Pedro I

Francisco I (1500–1545) was manikongo in 1545. King Francisco was the son of king Pedro Nkanga a Mvemba, who he succeeded after he was overthrown.

== Biography ==
King Francisco was born in 1500 and he succeeded his father, king Pedro Nkanga a Mvemba, after he was overthrown in 1545. Fransisco had a short reign, dying during the same year he became king. He was succeeded as king by his cousin Diogo.

== See also ==
- List of rulers of Kongo
- Kingdom of Kongo

| Preceded by Pedro I | Manikongo; 1545 | Succeeded by Diogo I |
