= Pedro I of Kongo =

Pedro I Nkanga a Mvemba of Kongo
- Mwene Kongo
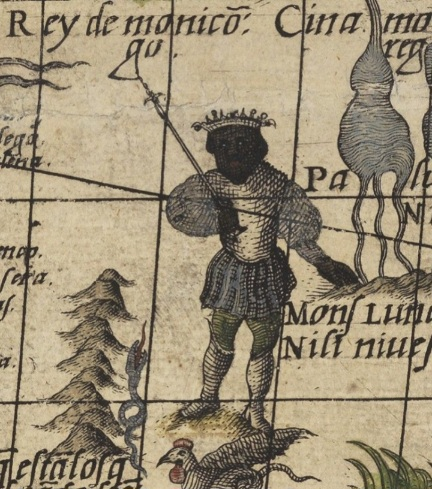
- Dom Pedro I

King of Kongo
- Reign: 1543 to 1545
- Predecessor: Afonso I
- Successor: Francisco I
- Born: 1478
- Died: 1566 (aged 87/88)
- Dynasty: Lukeni kanda
- Father: Afonso I

Pedro I Nkanga a Mvemba (1478–1566) was manikongo of the Kingdom of Kongo from 1543 until being deposed in 1545.

== Background ==
Pedro I was the son of King Afonso I and became his immediate successor in 1543. He was part of a splinter kanda known as the Kibala (Portuguese: Quibala) or court faction or house in Kongo which had its roots in the House of Kilukeni. He ruled only briefly before being overthrown by his nephew and Afonso I's grandson, Diogo I. Records of the events leading up to and following his dethronement were preserved in the inquest after Pedro's failed attempt to regain power.

== Asylum and conspiracy ==
During his overthrow, Pedro I managed to seek asylum in one of the churches of M'banza-Kongo. King Diogo I was reluctant to attempt removing him, allowing Pedro to plot Diogo's overthrow from within the church. The details of his plot are well known because Diogo launched an inquest into them in 1550. A copy of the inquest has survived in the Portuguese archives and was published in 1877 by Paiva Manso.

The inquest showed that Pedro had many friends in the kingdom and that there were confederates who wished to help him. Many held junior offices, many of the senior officials were reluctant to offer any help because they feared that Diogo would remove them from office. His most important confederate and cousin, Rodrigo de Santa Maria, fled to São Tomé, where he perhaps owned a plantation and tried to get assistance in Portugal and even in Rome. It was an intercepted letter that Pedro sent to his cousin to seek assistance that led Diogo to conduct the inquest and to send a copy to Portugal demanding that Santa Maria be extradited.

== See also ==
- List of rulers of Kongo
- Kingdom of Kongo

Preceded by Afonso I	Manikongo; 1543–1545	Succeeded by Francisco I
