= Garcia I of Kongo =

Garcia I
- Mwene Kongo
- Reign: 27 April 1624 to 7 March 1626
- Predecessor: Pedro II
- Successor: Ambrósio I
- Dynasty: House of Nsundi
- Father: Pedro II

Garcia I Mvemba a Nkanga was a manikongo of Kongo who ruled from April 27, 1624 to March 7, 1626.

== Early Reign ==
Garcia I was the son of King Pedro II. He was the second and last king from the House of Nsundi begun by his father in 1622. When Pedro II died in 1624, Garcia succeeded peacefully to the throne. Prior to his reign, his father had arranged for an anti-Portuguese alliance with the Dutch West India Company. When the Dutch arrived in 1624 ready to seize Luanda, António da Silva intercepted the fleet's delegation at Soyo. Acting against the wishes of the House of Nsundi, Silva feigned ignorance of the Dutch-Kongo plan and insisted that since Pedro II's death all Garcia I wanted was peace between Kongo and Portugal.

== Overthrow ==
There were those within Kongo's nobility unwilling to allow the House of Nsundi to continue on the throne. At the behest of the royal ladies at court, the Duke of Nsundi Manuel Jordão marched an army on the capital of São Salvador. Garcia was forced to flee to Soyo with his wife and grandmother, and the House of Kwilu regained the throne of Kongo.

== See also ==
- List of rulers of Kongo
- Kingdom of Kongo
- House of Nsundi

Preceded by Pedro II	Manikongo; 1624–1626	Succeeded by Ambrósio I
