= Diogo I Nkumbi a Mpudi =

Nkumbi-a-Mpudi Diogo I of the Kingdom of Kongo aka Kongo dia Ntotila
- Mwene Kongo
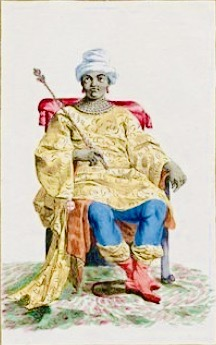
- Diego I of Kongo

King of Kongo
- Reign: 1545 – 4 November 1561
- Predecessor: Francisco I
- Successor: Afonso II
- Born: 1503
- Died: 4 November 1561 (aged 58)
- Dynasty: Lukeni kanda

Nkumbi-a-Mpudi Diogo I (1503 – 4 November 1561) was manikongo in 1545–1561. King Diogo was the grandson of king Afonso I of Kongo and won the throne after overthrowing his uncle Pedro Nkanga a Mvemba, forcing him to take refuge in a church in São Salvador, and after the short reign of his cousin Francisco.

Diogo's early struggles are documented in a legal inquest he conducted in 1550 into a plot against him launched by the former king. In 1555, the king cut all ties with the Portuguese whom he saw as meddlesome and a threat to the kingdom and expelled all 70 Portuguese inhabitants from the kingdom.

One of the primary sources we have which sheds light on Diogo's reign is a document from 1550, an inquest that he ordered into a plot by his predecessor, Dom Pedro Nkanga a Mvemba to regain his throne. The alleged plot was orchestrated from the church in which Dom Pedro sought sanctuary and involved, aside from the unseated king, a number of Kongolese lords who remained loyal to the former regent. The inquest ordered by Diogo was conducted by his magistrate and purveyor Jorge Afonso, and includes testimony from Kongolese lords who were both loyal to Diogo and conspirators in the plot, as well as lords who remained neutral and attempted to play both sides.

Along with Diogo becoming the king, many of his followers and chairmen were still men who stood by Dom Pedro. Diogo knew this, and he also knew that if he expelled them all at once that he would lose much support and make many enemies. What he had to do was slowly take out the people who stood by Dom Pedro and replace them with his people, he tried to do it slow enough to keep support, and fast enough so he could get rid of them.

King Diogo was anxious to extend the Roman Catholic faith in Kongo, work already started by Afonso I during his reign and due to Portuguese influence. Though Afonso had created a model for the Roman Catholic Church in Kongo, Diogo hoped to extend it throughout the rural areas and also into neighboring countries. After his death in 1561, he was succeeded by his illegitimate son Afonso II.

From a political standpoint in the Kingdom of Kongo, Portugal and Kongo formed an alliance that included Portuguese soldiers assisting the kings of Kongo in their wars. During this time, the kings of Kongo converted to Christianity. The Portuguese heavily influenced the customs of the Kings of Kongo that would eventually become a permanent way of living. In the Afro-Latino Voices text on page three it states, “As a Christian kingdom, Kongo built schools and started literacy in Portuguese”.

Although Portugal and Kongo had an alliance and corresponded regularly, their relationship was not always stable and peaceful. They corresponded regularly through letters that contain vital information about relations and internal fairs of Kongo. These letters stated that Afonso complained about the Portuguese soldiers because they were cowardly and incompetent, and the merchants encouraged disobedience in order to obtain slaves. Afonso also stated that some priests were not a perfect example of a particular quality pertaining to Christian morality. However, Afonso brought the situations under control by creating a supervised slave trade that escalated Kongo's ruling class to divide which started plots toward the royal family to receive succession.

In response to his uncle seeking refuge with religious leaders, Diogo developed his own network of clerical support, which he would control for the majority of his reign. To establish this, he sought the arrival of Jesuit Catholic missionaries in 1548. It is speculated that this was due to opposition from secular and Capuchin priests. He would later turn away from the Jesuits, and expel them from the region in 1555. He asserted that this was not due to a lack of faith in Catholicism, but rather in protest to the Jesuits' demands that he should give up all but his primary wife. He allowed priests more lenient of his deviation from Christian practices to stay. He supported the missionaries until his death in 1561.

== See also ==
- List of rulers of Kongo
- Kingdom of Kongo

| Preceded by Francisco I | Manikongo; 1545–1561 | Succeeded by Afonso II |
