= Albert Coyette =

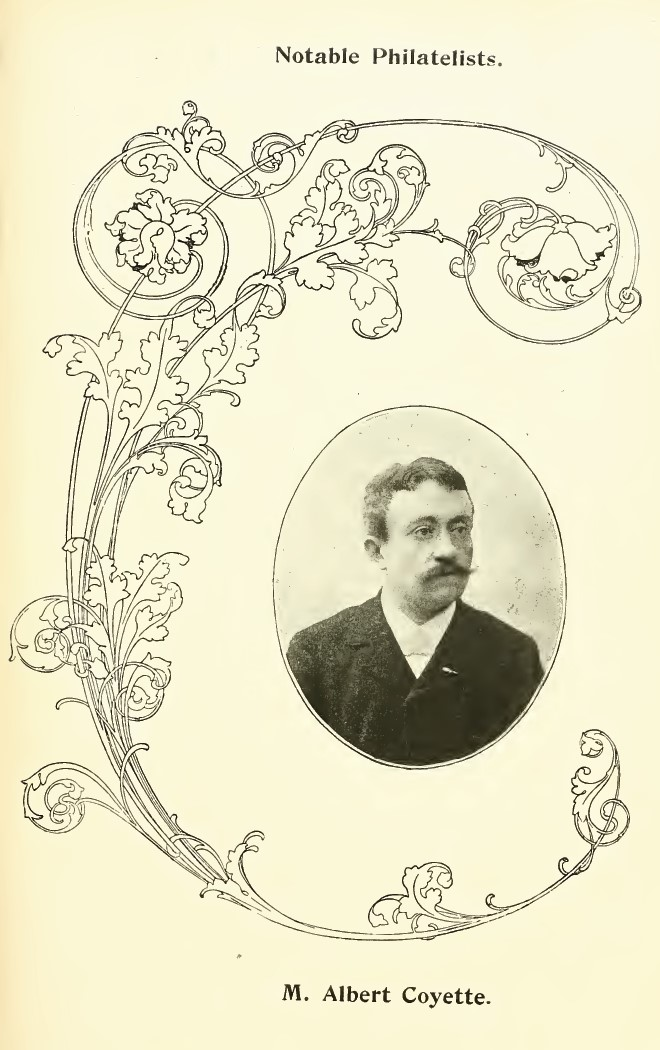
Albert Coyette, as pictured in The Philatelic Record.

Albert Coyette (born December 1860 - 15 February 1935) was the President of the leading French philatelic society, the Societe Francaise de Timbrologie, and the originator and energetic secretary of the Paris Exhibition of 1900.

== Early life ==
Coyette was born at Cambrai, in the Department of the Nord, in December 1860, and began to collect in 1872, when he was a student at the college of his native town.

== Collecting ==
Coyette had from the beginning a strong partiality for the stamps of the British Colonies and the United States, and also specialised in official essays of all countries. He kept, and regarded as precious relics, letters, prospectuses and price lists from Alfred Smith & Co. (of Bath), and V. Gruat et Bonn, Tavistock Street, London. He spoke with pride when the envelopes which he received from these English correspondents dignified him by the flattering title of " Esq." All these things made such an impression upon him, that when, twenty years later, he paid his first visit to London, he felt it both a duty and a pleasure to find out Tavistock Street, and his disappointment was keen, that, although the street, commonplace enough, was still there, the dealers in whom he was most interested had entirely disappeared.

Having retired temporarily from business in 1894, he gave up his time almost entirely to stamps, became a member of the Societe Philatelique Francaise, and was most regular in his attendance at its meetings. In 1898 he was elected President of the Societe Francaise de Timbrologie. From 1898 to 1900 he was also editor of the Revue Philatelique Francaise. In February, 1898, he brought forward a scheme for an International Philatelic Exhibition, to be held simultaneously with the Exposition Universelle in 1900, and secured its adoption by the Society, being appointed, the general secretary. After two years' hard work he had the satisfaction of seeing the fruit of his labours, and the opening of the Exhibition at the appointed time was his reward. An additional recompense was the honour of being made Officier d'Academie, which was conferred upon him on the opening day by M. Mougeot, Under-Secretary of State for Posts and Telegraphs.

The Philatelic Record described him as "an avowed enemy of that kind of specialism which concerns itself with stamps badly printed, wrongly perforated, and other freaks of a similar kind. He was a staunch believer in a general collection kept well up to date."

== Memberships ==
Coyette was a member of the Executive Committee of the French C.T.C., an Officer of the Order of the Green Dragon of Annam, and Knight of the Order of Christ of Portugal.
