= Kinkanga =

1622–1631 ruling dynasty of the Kingdom of Kongo

House of Kinkanga House of Nsundi Kikanga a Mvika kanda
- Parent house: House of Kilukeni
- Country: Kingdom of Kongo Kingdom of Loango Kingdom of Kakongo Kingdom of Ngoyo Kingdom of Ndongo Kingdom of Vungu
- Founded: 27 April 1622; 404 years ago
- Founder: Pedro II
- Final ruler: Garcia I
- Titles: List: King of Kongo; King of Loango; King of Kakongo; King of Ngoyo; King on this side of the Zaire and beyond it; King of Vungu; Lord of the Ambundu; Lord of Angola; Lord of Aquisima; Lord of Musuru; Lord of Matamba; Lord of Malilu; Lord of Musuko; Lord of Anzizo; Lord of the conquest of Pangu-Alumbu
- Deposition: Kingdom of Vungu: 1624 Jaga conquest Kingdom of Kongo: 26 June 1626
- Cadet branches: House of Kimpanzu

The Kinkanga, usually known as the Kinkanga a Mvika or House of Nsundi, was a royal kanda formed by King Pedro II, which ruled the Kingdom of Kongo from 1622 to 1631. While King Pedro II (ruled 1622–24) and his son Garcia I (ruled 1624–1626) were the only other member of the faction or kanda to rule, it retained powerful members in provincial offices in the 1650s until its destruction in the 1670s. Despite this loss in prominence, they were remembered in tradition and are evoked in a proverb, still current in the 1920s Nkutama a mvila za makanda "Kinlaza, Kimpanzu ye Kinlaza makukwa matatu malambila Kongo" (Kinkanga, Kimpanzu and Kinlaza are the three stones on which Kongo cooked).

== The compromise candidate ==
Since 1567, the House of Kwilu had ruled Kongo. When its king, Álvaro III, died in 1622, he had no heir old enough to assume the throne. The electors decided to grant the throne to Pedro II Nkanga a Mvika, the Duke of Mbamba. In Portuguese documents, the ruling house of King Pedro II is called Nsundi for the duchy the founding king's father ruled. The line of kings from the House of Kwilu virtually ended overnight (Ambrósio I being the lone exception from 1626 to 1631).

== Split with Portugal ==
The ascension of the House of Nsundi meant the end of what had become a tenuous relationship between Kongo and Portugal. The once close allies had fallen out over slaving and trade rights toward the end of the 16th century. The ambitious governor of the Portuguese colony in Luanda claimed that the king had given asylum to runaway slaves while Duke of Mbamba. Furthermore, he also claimed the right to appoint kings of Kongo. This led to a Portuguese invasion of Kongo the very year of King Pedro II's rise. The gross miscalculation of the Portuguese resulted in the king leading a force which crushed the invasion at the Battle of Mbandi Kasi.

== Diplomacy with the Dutch ==
After the disastrous war, the Portuguese sought peace with the House of Nsundi and calm was restored for a little while. Meanwhile, Pedro II harbored plans to remove the Portuguese from his region altogether and sought Dutch assistance to this aim. It would be up to another ruling house; however, to see these plans through.

== Garcia I ==
Garcia I succeeded his father as head of the house in 1624, but when he was overthrown by Manuel Jordão, the Duke of Nsundi in 1626, he fled to Soyo. There he was protected by the Count Paulo of Soyo for many years, as he had been appointed by Pedro II. As a result, Soyo formed a close bond with the house. A number of other appointees by Pedro II or Garcia remained in their offices even as other houses ruled Kongo. In 1656, members of the house that held office in São Salvador and the Marquis of Mpemba tried to overthrow Garcia II, and were defeated and the kanda was destroyed as a separate entity in 1678.

== See also ==
- Kingdom of Kongo
- List of rulers of Kongo
- Pedro II of Kongo
- Álvaro V of Kongo
- House of Kwilu
- House of Kimpanzu
- House of Kinlaza
