= Kwilu dynasty =

1567–1636 ruling dynasty of the Kingdom of Kongo

House of Kwilu Kwilu kanda Casa de Coulo
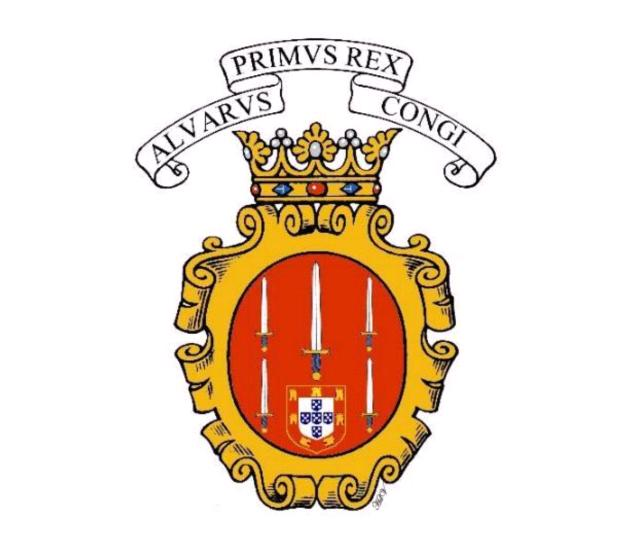
- Parent house: House of Kilukeni
- Country: Kingdom of Kongo Kingdom of Loango Kingdom of Kakongo Kingdom of Ngoyo Kingdom of Ndongo Kingdom of Vungu
- Founded: 1 February 1568; 458 years ago
- Founder: Álvaro I
- Final ruler: Álvaro IV
- Titles: List: King of Kongo; King of Loango; King of Kakongo; King of Ngoyo; King on this side of the Zaire and beyond it; King of Vungu; Lord of the Ambundu; Lord of Angola; Lord of Aquisima; Lord of Musuru; Lord of Matamba; Lord of Malilu; Lord of Musuko; Lord of Anzizo; Lord of the conquest of Pangu-Alumbu
- Deposition: Kingdom of Kongo: 24 February 1636

Kwilu, also known as the House of Kwilu (Portuguese: Coulo), was a kanda or royal lineage of the Kingdom of Kongo.

== Origins ==
Prior to the rise of the Kwilu kanda, the Kilukeni kanda or House of Lukeni had ruled Kongo since its inception around the end of the 14th century. After the death of King Henrique I, power passed into the hands of Álvaro I. Álvaro I was Henrique I's stepson, which probably explains why a new kanda was formed when he managed to inherit the throne. He came to power in 1567 and named his royal house for the small district in which he was born north of the capital.

== Reign ==
With the exception of the Jaga invasion during the first years of Álvaro I's reign, the House of Kwilu ruled the kingdom without interruption until 4 May 1622. It was then that Álvaro III died leaving a son that was too old to be elected. The Kinkanga kanda took over from then but was ousted and replaced with Ambrósio I putting the Kwilu kanda back in power. King Ambrósio was killed during a massive revolt and succeeded by the child Álvaro IV, the last king from the House of Kwilu. No members of the Kwilu gained the throne after 1636, and Kongo was dominated by warring houses claiming descent from Afonso I or his relatives.

== See also ==
- Kilukeni
- Kingdom of Kongo
- List of rulers of Kongo
- Kinkanga
