= Order of Christ (Kongo) =

Order of Christ Ordem de Cristo

Awarded by the Head of the Imperial House of Kongo
- Type: Dynastic Order
- Established: 1607 (National Order); 1914–present (House Order)
- Status: Discontinued as a national order in 1914; since 1915, the order is part of the dynastic house
- Grades: Grand Cross; Commander; Knight; Companion
- Ribbon Bar of the Order

The Imperial Order of Our Lord Jesus Christ, or simply the Order of Christ, is an order of chivalry continued by King Álvaro II of Kongo in 1607 after the Portuguese brought the Order of Christ to the Kingdom of Kongo. Álvaro I was given permission by the King of Portugal to grant knighthoods for the Order of Christ and his successors, approved by the Holy See, continued to serve as the fons honorum for the Order of Christ.

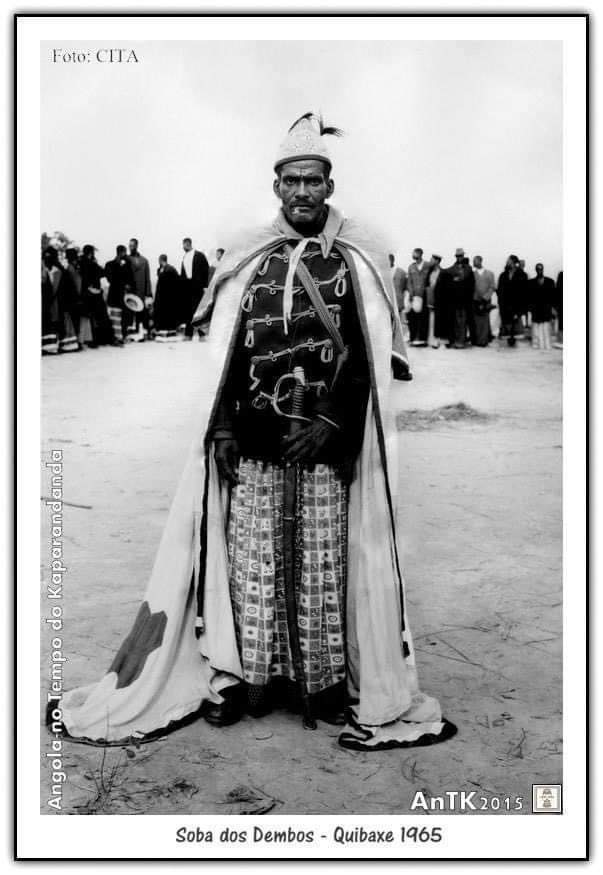
The Soba (Chief) is a member of the order in 1965 wearing the mantle of the Order of Christ (Kongo).

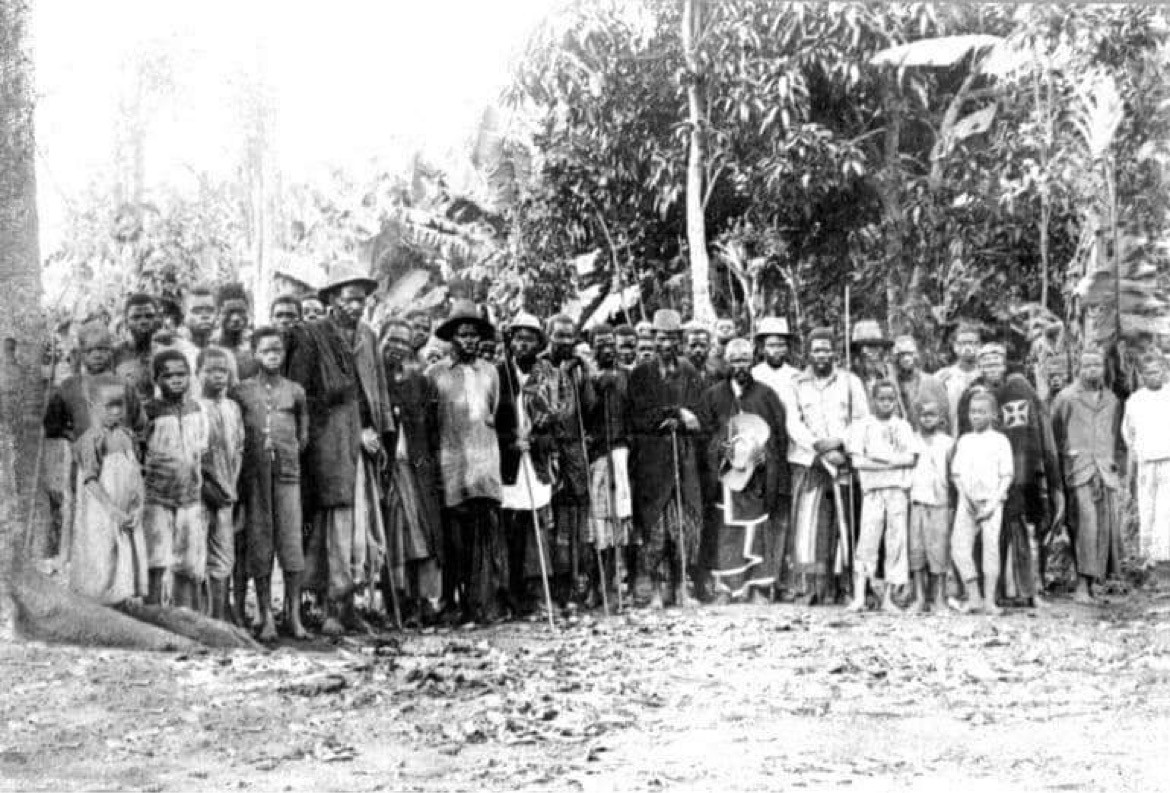
The Soba (Chief) in 1914 wearing the mantle of the Order of Christ (Kongo) in a group photo.

Historically, those who were awarded a knighthood in the Order of Christ wore mantles with an embroidered cross. The Order of Christ became a central part of the military life of the Kingdom of Kongo, including many members of the aristocracy. A number of local rulers underwent investiture into the Order of Christ. The Order of Christ, as with the Order of Saint James of the Sword, continues to be awarded ecumenically by the Imperial House of Kongo.

== Grades of the Order ==
The Order of Christ is composed of the following grades:

- Knight/Dame Grand Cross (GCOC)
- Knight/Dame Commander (KCOC/DCOC)
- Knight Officer/Dame Officer (KOOC/DOOC)
- Knight/Dame (KOC/DOC)

== See also ==
- History of the Order of Christ
- Order of Christ (Portugal)
- Order of Christ (Holy See)
- Order of Christ (Brazil)
