= Emanuele Ne Vunda =

Kingdom of Kongo ambassador

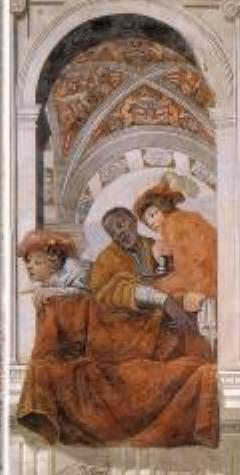
Painting of Emanuele Ne Vunda, Sala dei Corazzieri, Quirinal Palace, Rome, 1615–1616.

Antonio Emanuele Ne Vunda, also known as Antonio Manuel Nsaku Nvunda (or Vunta or Funda; died 1608), was an ambassador from the Kingdom of Kongo to the Vatican. He was the first African ambassador to the Vatican.

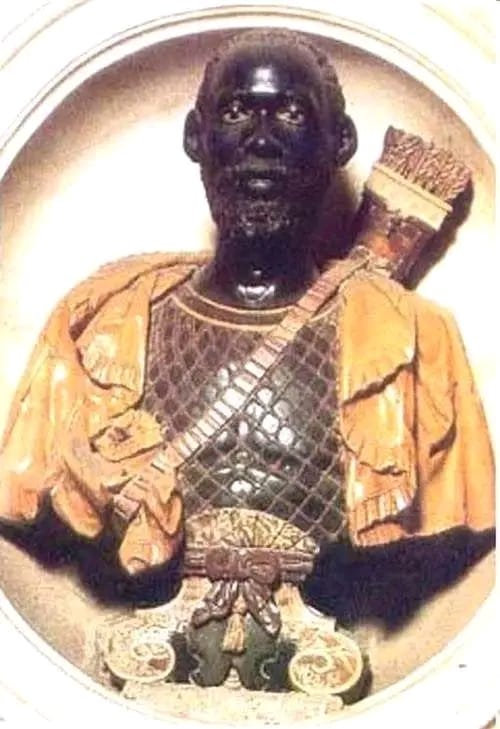

== Career ==
Ne Vunda was sent as ambassador by King Álvaro II in 1604. Ne Vunda traveled through Brazil and Spain and only reached Rome on 3 January 1608, but he died two days later of illness. He was the first African ambassador to the Holy See. He was buried at Santa Maria Maggiore in Rome.

== Legacy ==
A bust of Ne-Vunda made in colored marble can be seen at Santa Maria Maggiore by Francesco Caporale in Rome.

A painting of Ne Vunda is visible in the Sala dei Corazzieri in the Quirinal Palace, Rome, next to a painting depicting the 1615 Keichō embassy of Hasekura Tsunenaga from Edo Japan.

== Bibliography ==
- Teobaldo Filesi, Le relazioni tra il Regno del Congo e la Sede Apostolica nel XVI secolo, Pietro Cairoli, Como 1968.
- Luis Martínez Ferrer, Marco Nocca (ed.), “Coisas do outro mundo” A Missão em Roma de António Manuel, Príncipe de N’Funta, conhecido per “o Negrita” (1604-1608), na Roma de Paulo V, Urbaniana University Press, Città del Vaticano, 2003.
