= History of the Order of Christ =

Order of Christ (Portugal) Military Order of the Knights of Christ Real Ordem dos Cavaleiros de Nosso Senhor Jesus Cristo
- A Cross of the Order of Christ
- Active: 1318–present
- Allegiance: Portugal
- Type: Western Christian military order
- Nickname: Order of Christ
- Attire: White mantle with a red cross
- Battle honours: Crusades; Reconquista

The Military Order of Christ (previously Ordem dos Cavaleiros de Cristo "Order of the Knights of Christ") was founded in 1318. The order, in every sense of the term, were Knights Templar who continued their operations from their headquarters in Tomar, Santarém Portugal. Contrary to the belief that the Templar Order was renamed and established by King Denis of Portugal, the Templars merely moved back to their original headquarters in Tomar Castle which was an autonomous zone granted to the Templar Order. Reasons for this move and change of name were to protect the vast assets of the order from repatriation by the Catholic Church. The Templar assets were then transferred over to the Cavaleiros de Cristo, all with the blessing of King Diniz who helped pull off the deal with the Church.

The order was secularized in 1789, and dissolved in 1910. It was revived in 1917 within the Portuguese Republic, headed by the President of Portugal, as a decoration in recognition of outstanding services to the state.

== History of the Knights Templar in Portugal ==
The Templars were founded around 1118 and soon formed commanderies around Europe to support their efforts in the Holy Land, settling in Portugal at least since 1122, in the region of Braga, where the Order received successive donations and where they also bought lands. This occurred only two or three years after their foundation in Jerusalem, and about 7 years before their recognition and confirmation in the Council of Troyes. The Templars also received lands donated by D. Theresa in 1126, a few years before Portugal became a fully independent kingdom. Portugal was the first country in Europe where they settled.

Gualdim Pais, provincial Master of the Order of the Temple in Portugal, constructed the Convento de Cristo in 1160. According to folklore, he chose the location after drawing lots and receiving a sign to build a new Templar fortress on a hill between the river Fria and Saint Gregory's creek. Traditional local legends and chronicles preach that the choice was for mystical reasons and by divine inspiration, from practices like geomancy by the provincial Grand Master, based on exercises taken from luck and predestination. Reinforcing this magical view is the fact that the lot was part of a small chain of seven elevations (lugar dos sete montes), which became known as the city of seven hills, as the seven hills of Jerusalem, the seven hills of Rome or the seven columns of Constantinople.

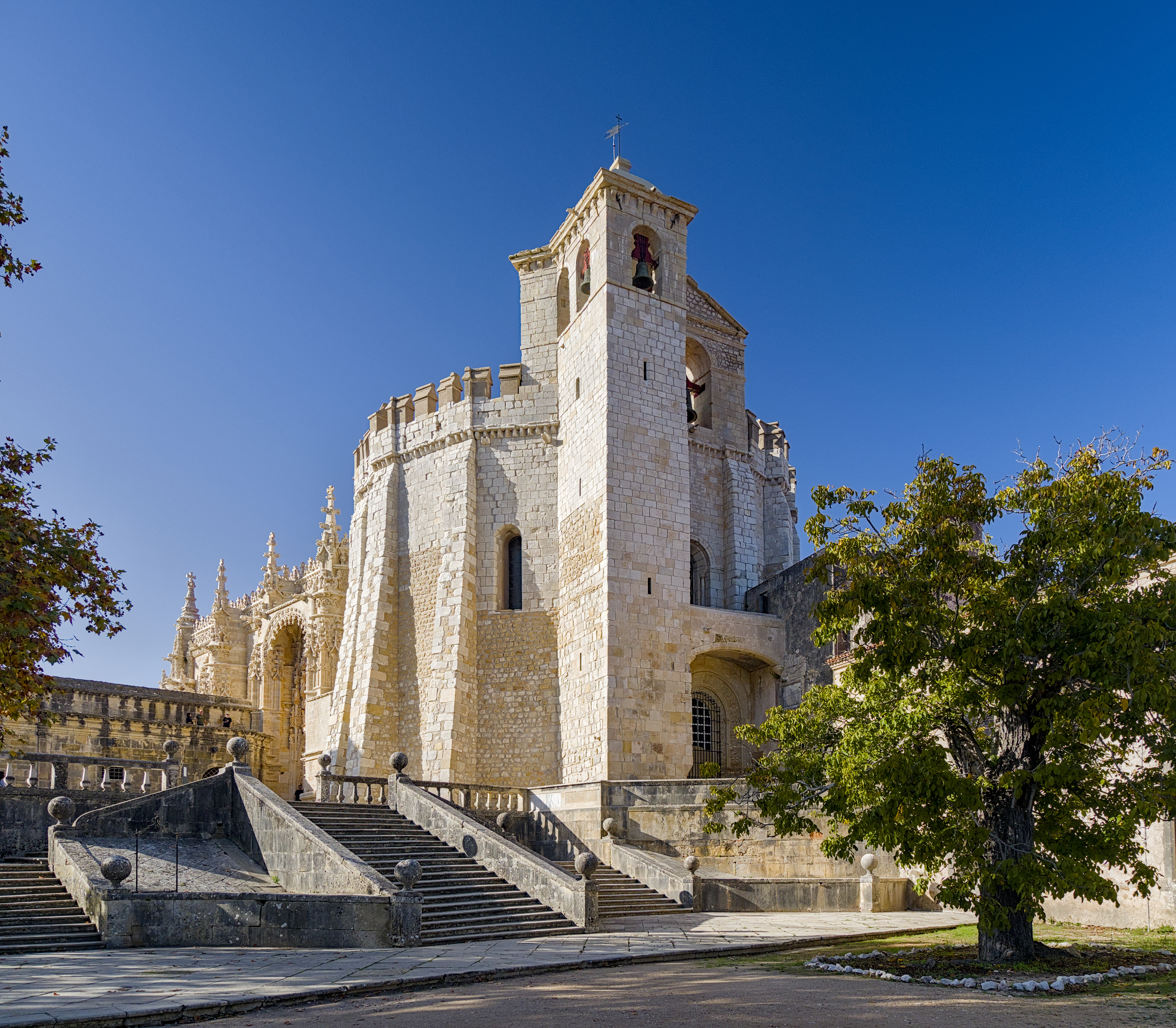
The "Convento de Cristo" in Tomar, central Portugal.

The Convento de Cristo is a testament to the Templars' architectural abilities. The octagonal church was inspired by the Islamic Dome of the Rock shrine in Jerusalem, used by the Templars as their base of operations. The Dome of the Rock is located on the Temple Mount, where the Temple of Jerusalem stood prior to its destruction in 70 A.D., and the Templars believed the Dome of the Rock was a remnant of the ancient Temple from which their name derives. The order incorporated features of the shrine into their imagery and architecture, including the seals of Grand-Masters. The architecture of the Church of the Holy Sepulchre may have also served as a model. The sepulchre itself stands in an elaborate structure within the rotunda (rotunda – 35 m diameter), surrounded by a group of three columns between four pairs of square piers columns supporting an ornamented, domed roof. It is possible that the 4th-century rotunda's columns were removed from their original location on the façade of the Roman temple. Renovation of the piers exposed evidence that the columns had originally been much higher and that the Crusaders cut them in half for use in the 12th-century rotunda.

On 13 July 1190, Abu Yusuf Yaqub al-Mansur, the King of Morocco laid siege to the Templars in Tomar. This test of strength confirmed the Templars' military power and established them as an indispensable presence in the defense of northern Portugal. Pais died in 1195 after ruling for 50 years.

== Birth of the Order ==
Floor Plan of the Church, Chapter House and Charola

After the Templar order's suppression by Pope Clement in 1312, King Denis set about creating a new order for the displaced knights in his realm. He instituted the "Christi Militia" under the patronage of Saint Benedict in 1317 (some sources say August 14, 1318), and Pope John XXII approved this order by a Papal bull on 14 March 1319, "AD EA EX QVIBVIS".

After four years of negotiations, Pope John XXII passed another bull authorizing Denis to grant the Templar's property to the Order of the Christ in 1323. The knights of the order were committed to vows of poverty, chastity and obedience to the king. It is unclear how many Templars continued in the new order; some historians would claim the Order of Christ was essentially the Templars under a new name, while others see it as a mostly original formation. The first Grand Master, Dom Gil Martins, had been a knight of Saint Benedict in the Order of Aviz.

The Order of Christ was first seated at Castro Marim, in the Algarve (in the Diocese of Faro). In 1357, the order was moved to the town of Tomar, near Santarém, former seat of the Order of the Knights Templars in Portugal. (Other sources give the movement date 1366 under the sixth Grand Master, Dom Nuno Rodrigues.)

== Henry the Navigator's Command ==
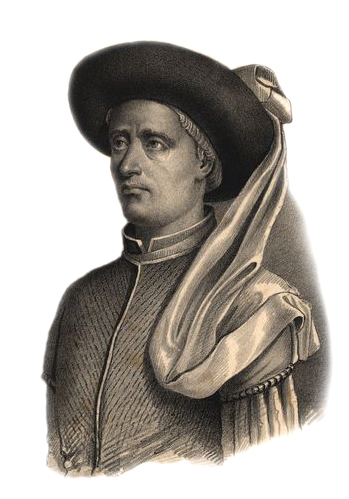
Henry the Navigator

After 1417, by King John I of Portugal's request to the Pope, Prince Henry the Navigator (1417–1460) became the order's Grand Master. Prince Henry was born in 1394, the king's third son. During that time, Duarte I and Afonso V were Kings of Portugal. In 1433, King Duarte I gave the Order "Sovereign" status not over these territories which already held, but over any future conquests.

Pope Calixtus III in 1455 confirmed that Afonso V extended his temporal jurisdiction by conceding the royal prerogative over three episcopal nominations in areas ruled by the Order. In 1460, King Afonso V granted the Knights of Christ a 5 percent levy on all merchandise from the new African lands. Using Order of Christ money, Prince Henry organized the Navigator's school in Sagres, preparing the way for Portuguese supremacy; from this village, the first great wave of expeditions of the Period of Discoveries were launched.

After Henry, the grand mastership was held by the royal family. Henry colonised the Azores and Madeira islands — his aim was to go south beyond Cape Bojador, south of the Canary Islands. During Prince Henry's rule, two Gothic cloisters were built in the Convent of Tomar. Henry was the Duke of Viseu and also member of the Knights of the Garter. Henry's impact on history is great, having arguably sparked the European interest in colonial exploration that would so transform the world for the next four centuries.

The cross of the Order adorned Portuguese sails in their travels to India, Brazil and Japan.

== After Henry the Navigator ==
Prince Henry was succeeded in the governorship of the Order by Prince Ferdinand, son of King Edward I.

In 1484, Emanuel, Duke of Beja, became the 11th Governor of the Order. Due to the fact that the discipline of the order was declining, Pope Alexander VI commuted the vow of celibacy to that of conjugal chastity in 1492; in 1496, the brethren were dispensed from celibacy and in 1505, from poverty, but they still continued their responsions (one third of their revenues) to the Order's treasury. (The condition that they should apply the third part of their revenues to the building and support of the Tomar Cloister) and the priests of which he bound to the whole of the three vows. Also in 1501, Pope Julius II mitigated the vow of poverty into the payment of a tax - the meia-anata; for the Order of Christ this tax was three-quarters of their annual revenues.

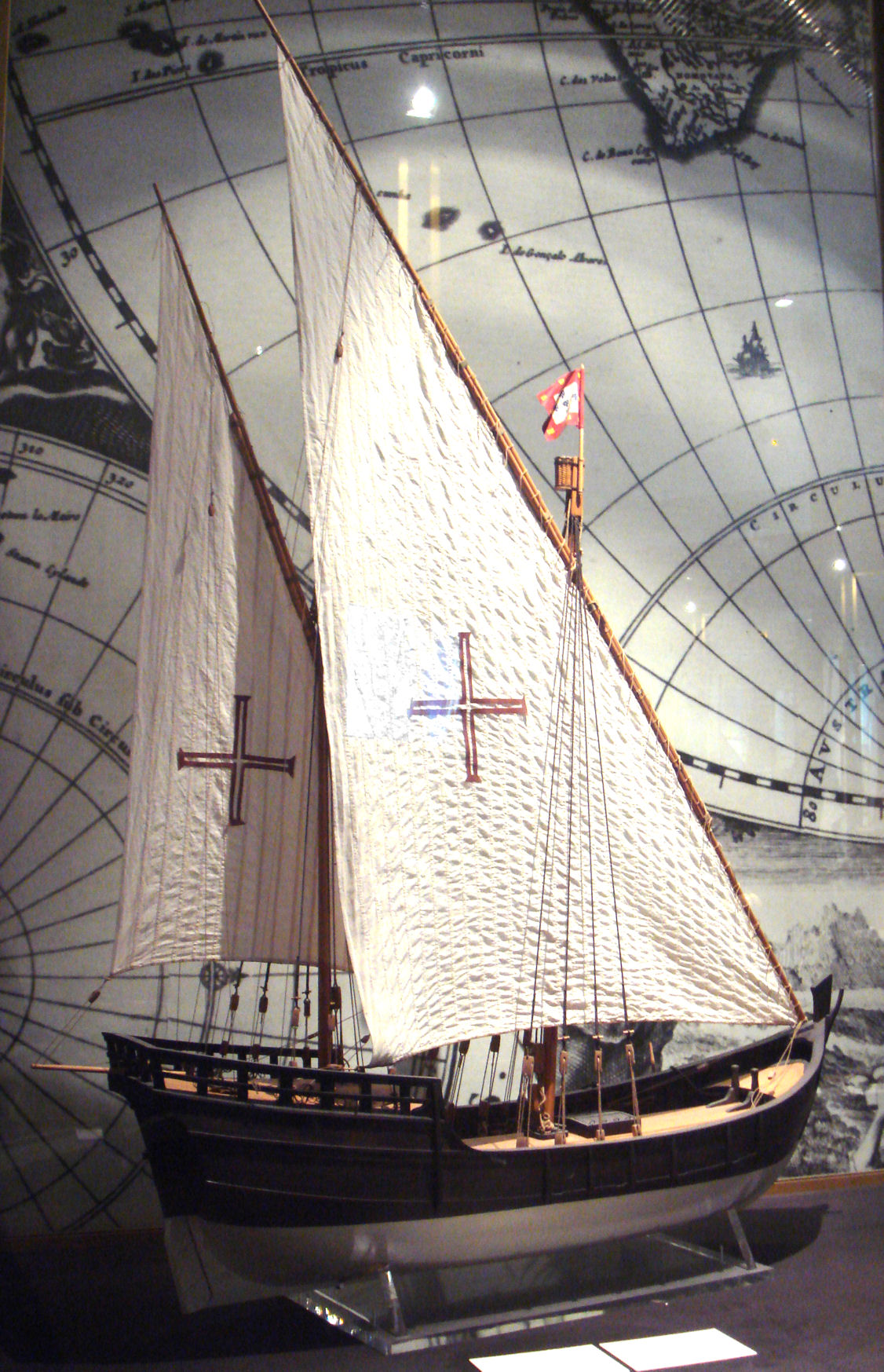
Portuguese caravel, adorned with the Cross of the Order. This was the standard model used by the Portuguese in their voyages of exploration. It could accommodate about 20 sailors.

Manuel I of Portugal sought and obtained the title of Grand Master by Pope Leo X's Bull Constante fide (June 30, 1516). King Manuel, João's successor, sent Vasco da Gama (a member of the Order of Christ) to sail around the African cape to India. He set sail in 1497 and reached Calicut. By the end of king Manuel's reign, the order possessed 454 commanderies in Portugal, Africa and the Indies. Manuel also made extensive additions to the Order's headquarters in Tomar. Manuel ordered that the church of Tomar be expanded westwards, spreading beyond the castle limits and opening up the Charola to add on to it a magnificent nave which housed the choir and the sacristy, becoming known as the chapter house. The order also began its step-by-step transformation from monastic to secular during Manuel's reign. At the end of this process, the order had taken the form of a royal institution.

The son of Manuel did not automatically obtain the succession right for ruling the order, and got an approval by Bull of Pope Adrian VI: Eximiae devotionis (April 14, 1523). After thirty years, John III obtained "Perpetual Administration" of all the Portuguese Military Orders including the Order of Christ, and of course the Grand Mastership of the Order passed to the Crown by Pope Julius III's Bull, issued in Rome in 1551. For the government of these orders in the king's name, John III instituted a special council named "Mesa das Ordens".

=== John III and Fra António ===
There are some scholars who say that in 1522 the Order was divided into two branches – a religious one under the Pope, and a civil one under the king, as they remain today – however, there is a lack of evidence supporting this. In 1523, John III formed a chapter of the Order giving Fra António (also known as Antonius of Lisbon) a Spanish-born Jerome friar, the authority and responsibility to reform the Order. The new statutes were approved in 1529 by the Friars.

The Grand Prior was removed from office and all the priests and religious of the Order were required to resume convent life at Tomar, and to wear the habit and cross of the Order. Several religious friars were persuaded to abandon the Order and others were expelled. António of Lisbon obtained the position of Prior. The violation of the tombs of the Templar Masters and the destruction and burning of documents of the Order are attributed to him. Years later, António was also charged with forcibly imposing the dictates of the Council of Trent on the Order of Christ, and later, for ordering two autos-da-fé, the first and only ones held in Tomar (involving four people executed and several penanced, especially New Christians, and allegedly the burning of papers and books as well). The Portuguese Inquisition was established in 1536 after the king sent a diplomatic mission to the Holy See led by an ally and friend of Anthony, Baltazar de Faria, who after his death, would be buried in the Convent of Christ in Tomar by Fra António himself. In 1567, António persuaded pope Pius V to give him control of all the convents of the order.

More than eighty years before the publication of the first Rosicrucian manifesto, around 1530, a short time before the reform of the Order and the expulsion of several friars, the cross and the rose were associated in the Convent of the Order of Christ. Three bocetes are on the abóboda (vault) of the interior chamber, which is thought to have been the initiation room because of its initial seven steps, seven carved rose-crosses, and a rosette depicting a circular sun on the vault, and its own underground small chamber or tomb of initiation at the end. In some of them, the rose flower can clearly be seen at the center of the cross.

=== Counterreform by Sebastian ===
King Sebastian tried to reverse the reform of brother Antonius of Lisbon in 1574. When Antonius persuaded the pope Pius V to give him the control of all convents of the order in 1567, King Sebastian protested and obtained confirmation of his post as Grand Master. As a result, the religious members of the Order were separated into lay and military membership.

=== Philippine Reforms ===
Between 1580 and 1640 there was another attempt to reform the order. The new statutes were enacted by the general chapter at Tomar 1619 and were promulgated by Philip III of Portugal in 1627. The conditions for admission to the order were noble birth and either two years' service in Africa or three years with the fleet.

== Secularization of the Order ==
The Convento de Cristo's famous Manuel I Chapter window by Diogo de Arruda (around 1510)

Pope Pius VI (1789) and Queen Mary I made the last attempt to reform the order. This reform made the convent of Tomar once again the headquarters of the whole order. The sovereign still remained Grand Master, but instead of the conventual prior there was a grand prior of the Order. In 1789 the Portuguese Order lost its religious character, being secularised by Queen Mary. Since 1789, the members consisted (besides the Grand Master and Great Commander) of six Knights of the Grand Cross, four hundred and fifty Commanders, and an unlimited number of Knights. Foreigners were exempt from the rules, but, at the same time, were excluded from the participation in the revenues of the Order. Only Catholics of noble descent could be admitted to the Order. The Order of Christ also survived in Brazil until the end of the Monarchic period in 1889.

In 1834 when the civil government of Portugal became anti-Catholic, after the defeat of King Miguel in the Civil War, under the constitutional monarchy the order lost its properties. The ancient Military Orders were transformed by the liberal constitution and subsequent legislation into mere Orders of Merit. The privileges which once had been an essential part of the membership of the old military orders were also ceased.

In 1910, when Portuguese monarchy ended, the Republic of Portugal abolished all the Orders except the Order of the Tower and Sword. However, in 1917, at the end of the Great War, some of these Orders were re-established as mere Orders of Merit, to reward outstanding services to the state; the office of Grand Master belongs to the Head of State – the President of the Republic. The Military Order of Christ, together with the other Portuguese Orders of Merit, had its statutes revised in several occasions, during the First Republic (1910–1926), then in 1962, and again in 1986.

The order is currently governed by a Chancellor and a Council of eight members, appointed by the President of the Republic, to assist him as Grand Master in all matters concerning the administration of the Order. The Military Order of Christ, despite its name, can be conferred both on civilians and on military, and on Portuguese and foreigners. Membership is conferred for outstanding services to the Republic of Portugal in parliament, in the government, in the diplomatic service, in courts of justice, in the civil service, or for meritorious service as a public authority.

== See also ==
- Order of Christ (Portugal)
- Order of Christ (Brazil)
- Order of Christ (Kongo)
- Supreme Order of Christ
