= Afonso I of Kongo =

Ruler of the Empire of Kongo from 1509 to 1542/43

Mvemba a Nzinga of Kongo
- Mwene Kongo
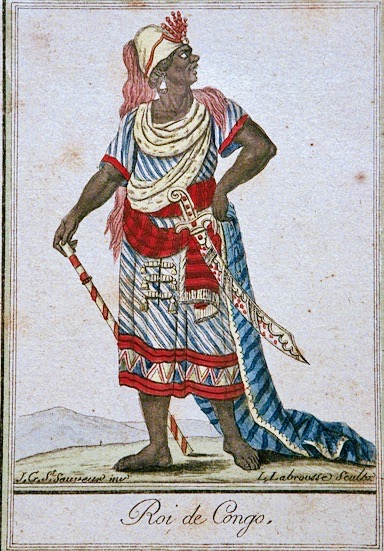

King of Kongo
- Reign: 1509 to late 1542 or 1543
- Predecessor: João I
- Successor: Pedro I
- Born: Mvemba a Nzinga c. 1456; Mbanza-Kongo
- Died: 1542 or 1543 (aged around 85-87); Mbanza-Kongo
- Dynasty: Lukeni kanda
- Father: Nzinga a Nkuwu
- Mother: Nzinga a Nzala or Yala
- Religion: Roman Catholicism (c. 1491) prev. Bukongo

Mvemba a Nzinga, Nzinga Mbemba, Funsu Nzinga Mvemba or Dom Afonso (c. 1456 – 1542 or 1543), also known as King Afonso I, was the sixth ruler of the Kingdom of Kongo from the Lukeni kanda dynasty and ruled in the first half of the 16th century. He reigned over the Kongo Empire from 1509 to late 1542 or 1543.

Born into the ruling house of House of Kilukeni, Afonso was the son of Nzinga a Nkuwu (Christianized as João I), king of the Kongo. Given political power from a young age, Afonso ruled the province of Nsundi during his father's reign. In an era of increasing relations with the Kingdom of Portugal, Afonso became a fervent convert to Catholicism and sought to embrace Portuguese institutions in his lands. Following the death of his father in 1506, Afonso prevailed in brief civil war against his brother, becoming the sixth king of Kongo.

As king, Afonso centralized governmental power in his capital city at Mbanza Kongo, curtailed the power of the Kongolese nobility, and expanded the kingdom's borders through war. Unlike previous Kongolese kings, he remained a Catholic throughout his life, and worked aggressively to convert his kingdom to Christianity. His reign saw increasing cultural, economic, and religious exchanges between Kongo and Portugal, including an expansion of the Atlantic slave trade. Afonso grew more cautious of Portuguese influence in his later reign, but relations between Kongo and Portugal remained close, with both kingdoms collaborating in war and trade. Keenly interested in diplomacy, Afonso sent Kongolese embassies to Lisbon, Rome, and wrote correspondence with political and religious leaders in Europe. He was succeeded by his son, Pedro I, in either 1542 or 1543.

Afonso is remembered for increasing the power of the Kongolese monarchy, his efforts to convert Kongo to Christianity, and his economic and military expansion of the kingdom.

== Biography ==
=== Pre-reign ===
Born around 1456 as Mvemba a Nzinga, he was the son of Manikongo (Mwene Kongo) (king) Nzinga a Nkuwu, the fifth king of the Kilukeni dynasty. of Kongo

In 1491, Mvemba a Nzinga was in his thirties and was the ruler of Nsundi province in the northeast portion of the kingdom. Mvemba a Nzinga competed for political power and trade revenue with fellow nobles, including members of his extended family, with many seeing him as a prime candidate to become the next king.

1491 saw the arrival of the first Portuguese to the Kingdom of the Kongo's capital at M'banza-Kongo. Mvemba took a fast interest to Christianity, taking the new name Afonso, and he was baptized after his father decided to convert to Christianity. He studied with Portuguese priests and advisers for ten years in the kingdom's capital. Letters written by priests to the king of Portugal paint Afonso as an enthusiastic and scholarly convert to Christianity. Around 1495, his father denounced Christianity and pushed priests out of the royal capital, but Afonso disagreed with his father and welcomed the priests into the capital of his Nsundi province. To the displeasure of many in the realm, he ordered the destruction of traditional art objects that might offend Portuguese sensibilities.

=== Rise to power ===
The coat of arms issued to King Afonso

In 1506 King João I of Kongo (the name Nzinga a Nakuru took upon his conversion) died, and potential claimants (including Afonso) rose up to take over the kingdom. Kongo was an elective rather than a hereditary monarchy, and so Afonso was not guaranteed the throne. Afonso was assisted in his attempt to become king by his mother, who kept news of João's death a secret and arranged for Afonso to return to the capital city of Mbanza Kongo to gather his followers. When the death of the king was finally announced, Afonso was already in the capital city and ready to take power.

The strongest opposition to Afonso's claim came from his half brother Mpanzu a Kitima (or Mpanzu a Nzinga). Mpanzu rebelled against his brother, raised an army in the provinces, and made plans to march on Mbanza Kongo. In the ensuing Battle of Mbanza Kongo, Afonso's adherence to Catholicism was seemingly rewarded; his victory was attributed to a miracle described by the chronicler Paiva Manso, who said the army of Mpanzu a Kitima, though outnumbering Afonso's, fled in terror at the apparition of Saint James the Great and five heavenly armored horsemen in the sky. The story, first recounted in a letter that was not survived by Afonso himself, is open to many interpretations, and may have been an allegory used to represent a coup launched by Afonso to expel anti-Catholic elements within the royal house. It is also important to notice the parallels with the miracle of Ourique and battle of Clavijo.

Mpanzu a Kitima was killed during the battle, either by falling into a sort of punji trap during his army's rout, or after being captured and then executed. The Portuguese are not mentioned as participating in the battle either by the missionaries present in the kingdom or by Afonso in his letters to Portugal's king. Afonso capitalized on his victory over his traditionalist brother; Christianity became the royal faith from then on, and the "miracle" resulting in Afonso victory at Mbanza Kongo was immortalized in the kingdom's coat of arms. The coat of arms was in use in Kongo until at least 1860.

=== Reign ===
Having consolidated his power as king, Afonso began a campaign of border expansion and government centralization. Similar to his father's rule, Afonso developed the royal capital at Mbanza Kongo, increasing the influence of the monarchy while also curtailing the power of the rural noble class. Throughout his reign, Afonso launched military campaigns of expansion to the south and east of the Kongo. These campaigns brought new peoples under Kongolese control. Captives taken in the wars were enslaved and forcibly relocated to Mbanza Kongo, while conquered lands paid tribute to Kongo in the form of valuable trade goods (such as iron, palm cloth, and ivory). The resulting surplus of food and labor allowed Afonso to fuel his plans to centralize governmental power in his capital and secure his throne against any potential rivals from the Kongolese noble class. Afonso also strengthened ties with provincial kingdoms (most notably Sonyo and Mbata) ruled by his kin, helping to secure Kongo's position as the leading power in the region.

As Afonso's reign continued, Kongo's relationship with Portugal continued to evolve. During the final years of his predecessor's reign as king, Portuguese missionaries had begun to play an increasingly important role as educators and diplomats in the Kongolese capital, while a number of Kongolese notables had been sent abroad to reside in the Portuguese capital of Lisbon. Trade and religious exchange between the two kingdoms grew after Afonso's rise to the Kongolese throne, as the Portuguese supported his pro-catholic policies.

Trade between Portugal and Kongo at the start of Afonso's reign mainly consisted of ivory, copper, and palm cloth, but also an increasing trickle of slaves. Afonso and the king of Portugal established a shared monopoly on trade in the "Five Rivers of Guinea" – modern day Benin and the Niger Delta. Trade between Portugal and Kongo continued as Portugal continuously expanded into the area; most notably, the establishment of a Portuguese colony on the island of São Tomé led to an increased Portuguese demand for slaves.

Afonso saw benefits from the strengthening ties with Portugal, as his efforts to convert Kongo to Catholicism were aided by the Portuguese. In 1512, Afonso received an official embassy from Portugal and send Kongolese ambassadors to Lisbon. Increased trade led to a flourishing economy centered around the highly-productive royal capital at Mbanza Kongo, which also benefited Afonso's government. Kongo's history of military expansion made it an efficient exporter; the tribute of raw materials sent to Mbanza Kongo by its tributaries could be processed into exportable goods, while captured peoples could be sold to the Portuguese by royal representatives. By the 1510s, Afonso entered an arrangement in which the Portuguese provided him with military assistance in exchange for a share of slaves taken captive during Kongo's wars of expansion. In 1512, Afonso led a military campaign against the Kingdom of Ndongo to the south; in correspondence with King Manuel of Portugal, Afonso mentioned that he had sent him 410 slaves captured during the war. Slaves not sold to the Portuguese were retained as royal property or sold into the domestic slave market of Kongo.

As the slave trade grew, Afonso and Kongo's relationship with Portugal grew increasingly complex. Slaves became increasingly used as currency in the Kongo, with Afonso sending slaves to Portugal to pay for the education of Kongolese notables and to buy trade goods, such as firearms. Kongo had traditions in place that regulated the slave trade—the sale or enslavement of Kongolese freemen was prohibited, as was the export of female slaves. Kongolese criminals could be condemned to slavery, but could not be exported. However, as the Portuguese demand for slaves grew, these laws were increasingly subverted. By the mid-1520s, members of the Kongolese nobility had begun to illegally import goods directly from Portuguese merchants, thus bypassing the royal monopoly on trade held by Afonso and the Kongolese monarchy. To pay for these imports, some Kongolese nobles illegally exported slaves to the Portuguese, with some going so far as to kidnap and enslave freeborn Kongolese. These developments worried and angered Afonso, who issued a letter protesting the circumvention of Kongolese law in 1526. Writing in a letter to the king of Portugal,

Each day the traders are kidnapping our people – children of this country, sons of our nobles and vassals, even people of our own family. This corruption and depravity are so widespread that our land is entirely depopulated. We need in this kingdom only priests and schoolteachers, and no merchandise, unless it is wine and flour for Mass. It is our wish that this Kingdom not be a place for the trade or transport of slaves. Many of our subjects eagerly lust after Portuguese merchandise that your subjects have brought into our domains. To satisfy this inordinate appetite, they seize many of our black free subjects. ... They sell them. After having taken these prisoners [to the coast] secretly or at night. ... As soon as the captives are in the hands of white men they are branded with a red-hot iron.

To counter the trade in illegally-exported Kongolese slaves, Afonso threatened to end the slave trade if Portugal did not intervene and better regulate its merchants. To reform the trade, Afonso reiterated the need to follow Kongolese law and not enslave Kongolese freemen, while also establishing a board to better regulate the slave trade. Afonso also established a special committee, made up of Kongolese and Portuguese merchants, to determine the legality of the enslavement of those who were being sold. These regulatory efforts greatly slowed or ended the enslavement of free Kongolese in the near term, though sources debate on whether or not the issue resulted in the longer-term erosion of the power of the Kongolese kingdom.

Afonso continued to expand Kongo's borders into the 1540s, conquering lands on the Zaire river, launched raids into northern Angola, while also forcing the rival kingdoms of Ndongo and Matamba to become Kongolese tributaries. Seeking to better tie Kongo into the growing Portuguese empire in Africa, he continued to encourage trade with Portugal; by the 1540s, he had royal representatives present in Sao Tome, and had also (unsuccessfully) petitioned Portugal to cede the island colony to the Kongo. Afonso had to navigate the changing priories of his kingdom, the Portuguese crown in Europe, and the increasingly influential Portuguese community in Africa, which often had different motivations.

In the later years of his rule, Afonso and the Kongo increasingly maneuvered to ensure the kingdom's monopoly on the slave trade. This faced competition from the Portuguese, who established a trading outpost in Luanda, thereby opening a new market for slaves independent of the Kongolese market. The kingdom of Ndongo also began growing in power, breaking free of Kongolese influence and skirmishing with Kongo on its southern border. Portuguese merchants, eager for a new supply of slaves, provided limited support to the Ndongans, further destabilizing the region. Afonso reacted by instituting new tolls on the road to Luanda, ensuring his kingdom was able to tax the slave trade. He also took efforts to ensure roads into the Kongolese interior remained open so that the slave trade could continue. Afonso and his successors faced a continuing problem in that slaves had become the unit of currency for use in overseas purchases, and so the Kongolese monarchy was reliant on the sale of slaves to maintain its diplomatic and economic power abroad.

==== Conversion of Kongo ====
Afonso is best known for his vigorous attempt to convert Kongo to a Catholic country, by establishing the Roman Catholic Church in Kongo, providing for its financing from tax revenues, and creating schools. By 1516 there were over 1000 students in the royal school, and other schools were located in the provinces, eventually resulting in the development of a fully literate noble class (schools were not built for ordinary people). Afonso also sought to develop an appropriate theology to merge the religious traditions of his own country with that of Christianity. He studied theological textbooks, falling asleep over them, according to Rui de Aguiar (the Portuguese royal chaplain who was sent to assist him). To aid in this task, Afonso sent many of his children and nobles to Europe to study, including his son Henrique Kinu a Mvemba, who was elevated to the status of bishop in 1518. He was given the bishopric of Utica (in North Africa) by the Vatican, but actually served in Kongo from his return there in the early 1520s until his death in 1531.

Afonso's efforts to introduce Portuguese culture to the Kongo was reflected in several ways. The Kongolese aristocracy adopted Portuguese names, titles, coats of arms, and styles of dress. Youths were sent from elite families to Europe for education. Kongolese noblemen invested in the Portuguese colony on São Tomé, where the Kongolese monarchy had appointed representatives. Christian festivals were observed, churches were erected, and craftsmen made Christian artifacts that were found by missionaries in the 19th century.

Significantly, religious brotherhoods (organizations) were founded in imitation of Portuguese practices. The ranks of brotherhoods would be called by different European titles, with the elected leader of each brotherhood having the title "king". To celebrate Pentecost, these brotherhoods organized processions that had the multiple motives of celebrating Saints, the brotherhoods themselves, and allowed the brotherhoods an opportunity to collect money. These celebrations lived on in slave communities in Albany, NY as Pinkster.

=== Death ===
Toward the end of his life, Afonso's children and grandchildren began maneuvering for the succession, and in 1540 plotters that included Portuguese residents in the country made an unsuccessful attempt on his life. He died toward the end of 1542 or perhaps at the very beginning of 1543, leaving his son Pedro to succeed him. Although his son was soon overthrown by his grandson Diogo (in 1545) and had to take refuge in a church, the grandchildren and later descendants of three of his daughters provided many later kings.

== Historical analysis ==
As the ruler of Kongo during a transformative and disruptive period of Kongolese history, Afonso's reign has been the area of historical study.

Virtually all that is known about Kongo in the time of Afonso's reign is known from his long series of letters, written in Portuguese, primarily to the kings Manuel I and João III of Portugal. The letters are often very long and give many details about the administration of the country. Many letters complain about the behavior of several Portuguese officials, and these letters have given rise to an interpretation of Afonso's reign as one in which Portuguese interests submerged Afonso's ambitions.

In Adam Hochschild's 1998 book King Leopold's Ghost, Hochschild characterizes Afonso as a "selective modernizer" because he welcomed European scientific innovation and the church but refused to adopt Portugal's legal code and sell land to prospectors. In fact, Afonso ridiculed the Ordenações Manuelinas (new Portuguese law code) when he read it in 1516, asking the Portuguese emissary de Castro, "What is the punishment, Castro, for putting one's feet on the ground?" No contemporary record mentions anything about land sales, indeed land in Kongo was never sold to anyone.

The precise motivation behind Afonso's campaign of conversion is unclear. "Scholars continue to dispute the authenticity of Kongolese Christian faith and the degree to which the adoption of a new faith was motivated by political and economic realities." Although the degree to which Afonso was purely spiritually motivated is uncertain, it is clear that the Kongo's conversion resulted in the far-reaching European engagement with both political and religious leaders who supported and legitimized the Christian kingdom throughout the rest of its history.

== Popular culture ==
- Afonso I (referred to as Mvemba a Nzinga) leads the Kongolese civilization in the 2016 4X video game Civilization VI.

== See also ==
- Kingdom of Kongo
- List of Manikongo of Kongo

== Bibliography ==
- Afonso's letters are all published, along with most of the documents relating to his reign in:
  - António Brásio, Monumenta Missionaria Africana (1st series, 15 volumes, Lisbon: Agência Geral do Ultramar, 1952–88), vols. 1, 2 and 4.
  - While a separate publication of just his letters and allied documents (in French translation) is in Louis Jadin and Mirelle Dicorati, La correspondence du roi Afonso I de Congo (Brussels, 1978).
- McKnight, Kathryn Joy, and Leo J. Garofalo. "Afro-Latino Voices: Narratives from the Early Modern Ibero-Atlantic World, 1550-1812."

Preceded by João I	Manikongo; 1509–1542/43	Succeeded by Pedro I
