= Military Order of Christ =

Portuguese honorific order established in 1319

Military Order of Christ Ordem Militar de Cristo
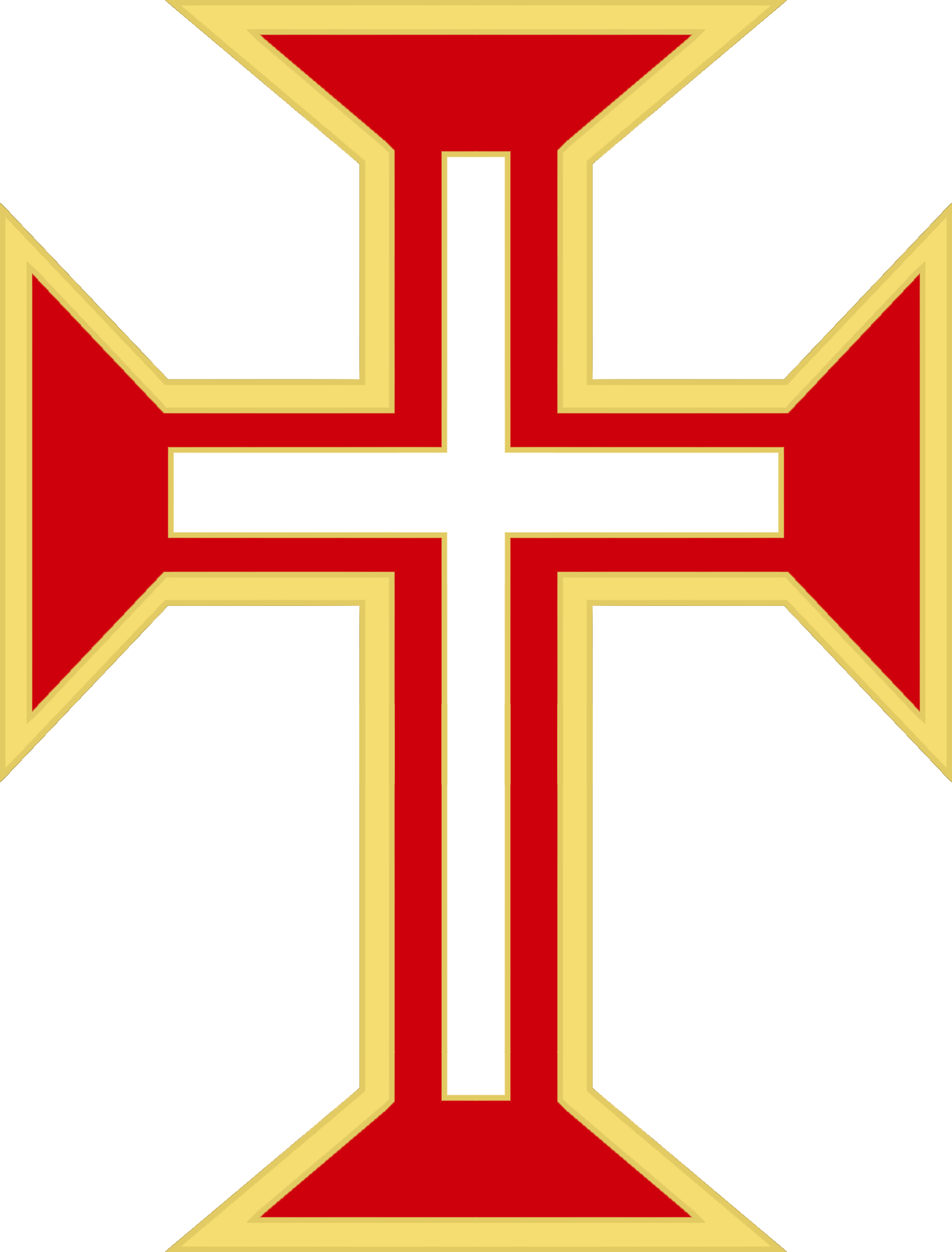
- Emblem of the Order

Awarded by the president of Portugal
- Type: Ancient military order
- Established: 1318 (founded); 1789 (secularized)
- Country: Portugal
- Ribbon: Red
- Motto: In hoc signo vinces (In this sign thou shalt conquer)
- Eligibility: Portuguese and foreign nationals
- Criteria: Relevant services to the country in the exercise of functions related to the government or public administration
- Status: Active
- Founder: Denis of Portugal
- Grand Master: President of Portugal
- Chancellor: Guilherme d'Oliveira Martins
- Grades: Grand Collar (GColC); Grand Cross (GCC); Grand Officer (GOC); Commander (ComC); Officer (OC); Knight (CvC)/Dame (DmC)

Precedence
- Next (higher): Military Order of the Tower and Sword
- Next (lower): Military Order of Aviz
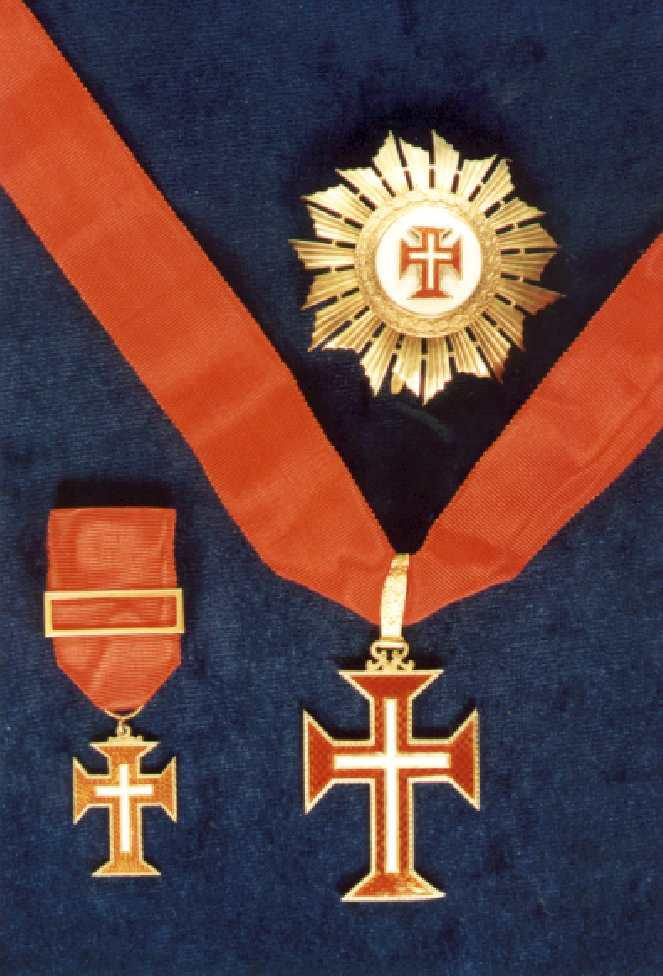
- Insignia of the Order Ribbon bar of the order

The Military Order of Christ (Note: Portuguese: Ordem Militar Cristo, European Portuguese pronunciation: [ˈɔɾ.dɐ̃j̃ mi.liˈtaɾ dɨ ˈnɔ.su sɨˈɲoɾ ʒɨˈzuʃ ˈkɾiʃ.tu]) is a Portuguese honorific order. It is the former order of Knights Templar as it was reconstituted in Portugal. Before 1910, it was known as the Royal Military Order of Our Lord Jesus Christ, (Note: Portuguese: Real Ordem Militar de Nosso Senhor Jesus Cristo, European Portuguese pronunciation: [rɨˈal ˈɔɾ.dɐ̃j̃ mi.liˈtaɾ dɨ ˈnɔ.su sɨˈɲoɾ ʒɨˈzuʃ ˈkɾiʃ.tu]) and the Order of the Knights of Our Lord Jesus Christ. (Note: Portuguese: Ordem dos Cavaleiros de Nosso Senhor Jesus Cristo, European Portuguese pronunciation: [ˈɔɾ.dɐ̃j̃ duʃ kɐ.vɐˈlɐj.ɾuʃ dɨ ˈnɔ.su sɨˈɲoɾ ʒɨˈzuʃ ˈkɾiʃ.tu]) It was founded in 1318, with the protection of King Denis of Portugal, after the Templars were abolished on 22 March 1312 by the papal bull, Vox in excelso, issued by Pope Clement V. King Denis refused to pursue and persecute the former knights as had occurred in most of the other sovereign states under the political influence of the Catholic Church.

Heavily swayed by Philip IV of France, Pope Clement had the Knights Templar annihilated throughout France and most of Europe on charges of heresy, but Denis revived the Templars of Tomar as the Order of Christ, largely for their aid during the Reconquista and in the reconstruction of Portugal after the wars. Denis negotiated with Clement's successor, John XXII, for recognition of the new order and its right to inherit the Templar assets and property. This was granted in a papal bull, Ad ea ex quibus, on 14 March 1319.

There exists also a parallel Supreme Order of Christ of the Holy See, the Order of Christ of the House of Orléans-Braganza, and the Order of Christ of Kongo.

== History ==
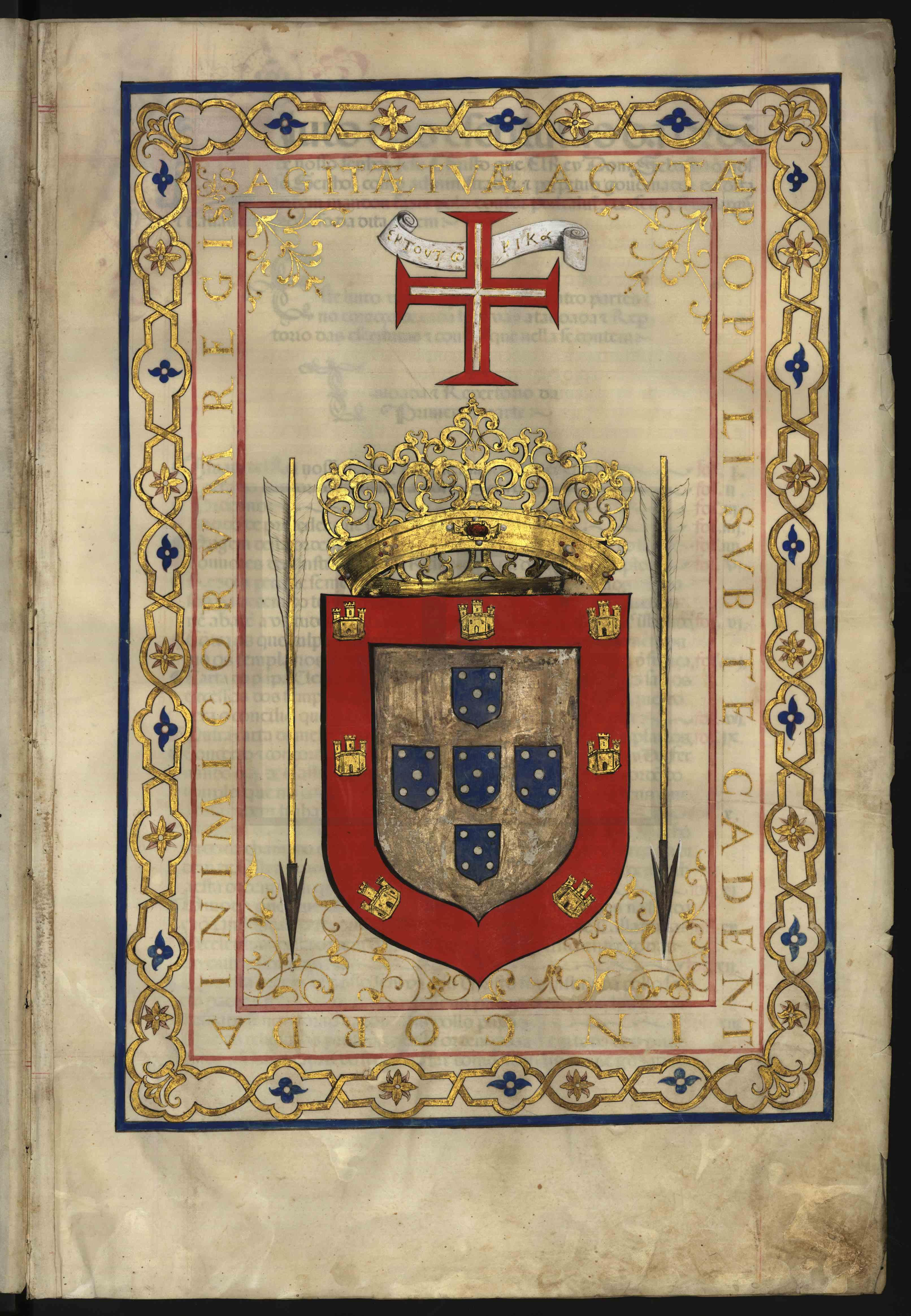
Book of the deeds of the order of Christ ordered to be made by Sebastian of Portugal, 1560

The order's origins lie in the Knights Templar, founded circa 1118. The Templars were persecuted by the king of France and eventually disbanded by the pope in 1312. King Denis of Portugal created the Order of Christ in 1318 for those knights who survived their mass slaughter throughout Europe and was confirmed by the papal bull Ad ea ex quibus issued by Pope John XXII in Avignon in March 1319. The bull was issued at the request of Denis so that the newly created order could succeed the order of the Temple, which had been dissolved in 1311 by Pope Clement V.

The Templars' assets were thus assigned to the new order of Our Lord Jesus Christ, which had its first headquarters at the church of Santa Maria do Castelo, in Castro Marim. In 1356, the headquarters moved to the castle of Tomar, the former seat of the order of the Temple in Portugal. At the time, it was a strictly religious order, with the pope as its sovereign and its grand masters being professed knights bound by a vow of poverty. The first grand master was Gil Martins, who was also master of Avis at the time.

A crucial moment for the order's future came with the appointment of Prince Henry, duke of Viseu, as "governor and administrator". The Prince, who held much of the kingdom's land, could not take a vow of poverty, which is why this new title was created.

Since the Prince was responsible for administering the order's assets, it is no surprise that its considerable resources were used in the discoveries. The Cross of Christ, symbol of the order, sailed across the seas, raised on the sails of Portuguese caravels, becoming one of the most recognized national symbols. The Portuguese Crown thus exercised full control over the order of Christ, even though the Holy See continued to treat it as a religious order. For this reason, the order came to exercise not only spiritual administration over the discovered territories but also temporal administration, which gave it remarkable strength.

The order's administration remained tied to the Crown for circumstantial reasons. Prince Manuel of Portugal was governor of the order when he was acclaimed King Manuel I. Through the bull Constante fide, Manuel I became the first king to also be grand master of the order of Christ.

However, it was only during the reign of King John III of Portugal that the masterships of the military orders were granted in perpetuum to the Portuguese Crown by Pope Julius III. The bull Praeclara Clarissimi, dated November 30, 1551, made the administration of the orders hereditary, marking a separation from the Holy See that would be confirmed by future developments. It is common to find portraits of Portuguese kings wearing the insignia of the order of Christ, attesting to the order's significance throughout the centuries. With the reform by Maria I of Portugal, enacted by the royal charter of June 19, 1789, monarchs began to wear the Sash of the Three Orders.

As for the order of Christ, the law made it clear that its members continued to take precedence over those of the orders of Avis and of Saint James of the Sword. There was also a clear concern in stating that this should not lead to the conclusion or claim that the grand crosses of Saint James were inferior to those of Christ.

The royal charter also defined the purposes to which the order of Christ would be associated in the future: "The highest political, military, and civil posts and offices, if merited by service, shall be adorned with the habit of the order of Christ."

The undeniable prestige of the order—as successor to the Order of the Temple and a driving force behind the discoveries—thus continued in its role as an honorary order, bestowing honors upon those holding the highest offices in the country.

Abolished by the decree of October 15, 1910, along with the "ancient noble orders", it was reinstated by the decree of December 1, 1918, then intended "to reward outstanding services rendered by nationals or foreigners to the country or to humanity, both military and civilian." In the 1962 and 1986 legislation, the Military Order of Christ remained associated with sovereign functions, especially in diplomacy, the judiciary, and public administration. Finally, in the 2011 legislation, the wording returned to the broader reference to the "exercise of sovereign functions".

In this context, throughout the 20th century, recipients of the Military Order of Christ included those holding the country's highest offices, such as former presidents of the Assembly of the Republic, former prime ministers and ministers, and former military chiefs.

During state visits, it is often awarded to the spouses of heads of state and occasionally to the heads of state themselves. This was the case with president Michelle Bachelet, honored by president Cavaco Silva in 2009.

The Holy See, claiming that the Portuguese order had lost its religious character, took advantage of the 1905 reorganization of its own orders to claim such a symbolic name for itself. Thus, the grand collar of the Supreme Order of Christ was created, to be awarded to especially worthy catholic heads of state. There is currently no head of state bearing this order. It is worth noting that the grand collar has never been awarded to a Portuguese head of state, despite being granted to figures such as president Éamon de Valera of Ireland, French presidents Albert Lebrun and Charles de Gaulle, general Francisco Franco of Spain, king Baudouin I of the Belgians, and several grand masters of the Sovereign Military Order of Malta.

== Grades and badges ==
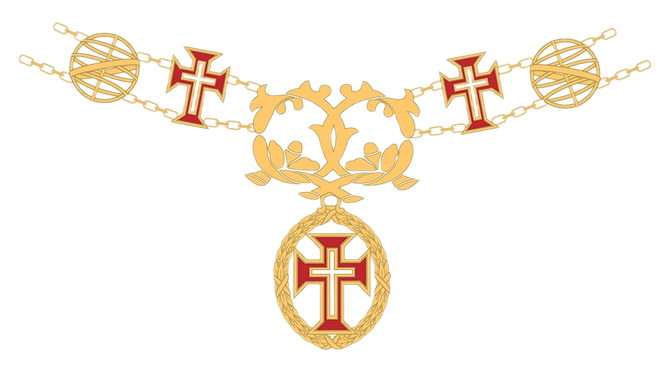
Grand collar of the order created in 2021.

The Order of Christ, as awarded by the Portuguese government today, comes in six classes:

- Grand Collar (GCol), which wears grand collar, the badge of the Order on a sash on the right shoulder, and the star of the Order in gold on the left chest. This rank was introduced in 2021.
- Grand Cross (GCC), which wears the badge of the Order on a sash on the right shoulder, and the star of the Order in gold on the left chest;
- Grand Officer (GOC), which wears the badge of the Order on a necklet, and the star of the Order in gold on the left chest;
- Commander (ComC), which wears the badge of the Order on a necklet, and the star of the Order in silver on the left chest;
- Officer (OC), which wears the badge of the Order on a ribbon with rosette on the left chest;
- Knight (CvC) or Dame (DmC), which wears the badge of the Order on a plain ribbon on the left chest.

=== Insignia ===
- The grand collar is formed by simple crosses of the Order, alternating and linked with armillary spheres, gilded, suspended by a double chain of simple links, gilded; in the center, two interlocked branches of quercus coccifera, gilded; the necklace, all in gold, has the cross of the Order hanging, profiled in gold, surrounded by a festoon, of open cut, of laurel leaves with its fruits, tied with crossed ribbons on the tops and sides, also in gold.
- The badge of the Order is a gilt cross with enamel, similar to the Order's emblem illustrated here, but with a longer lower arm. During the monarchy there were separate badges for civil and military knights: civil knights wore a badge similar to the modern version, but with the Sacred Heart of Christ above it; military knights had a completely different insignia, this being a gilt, blue and white enamelled Maltese Cross with white enamelled oval shields (each bearing a design similar to the Coat of arms of Portugal minus the red border) between the arms of the cross, the whole surrounded by a wreath of palm; the central disc was in white enamel, with a miniature of the modern badge in it; the badge was topped by a gilt crown.
- The star of the Order has 22 asymmetrical arms of rays, in gilt for Grand Cross and Grand Officer, and in silver for Commander. The central disc is in white enamel, with a miniature of the modern badge in it. During the monarchy the Sacred Heart of Christ was placed at the top of the star.
- The ribbon of the Order is plain red.

Bars of the Military Order of Christ
Grand Collar	Grand Cross	Grand Officer	Commander	Officer	Knight

== People associated with the Order of Christ ==
=== Grand Masters ===
- Henry the Navigator (Grand Master)
- Manuel I (Grand Master)
- Infante Ferdinand (Grand Master)
- Sebastian of Portugal (Grand Master)

=== Others ===
- John Alexander Fladgate (Commander)
- Vasco da Gama (also to the Order of Santiago before)
- Pedro Álvares Cabral
- João Gonçalves Zarco
- Gonçalo Velho Cabral
- Bartolomeu Dias
- D. Beatrice
- Francisco de Almeida
- Miguel Corte-Real
- Gaspar Corte-Real
- Tristão da Cunha
- Martim Afonso de Sousa
- João de Castro
- Cristóvão da Gama
- Tomé de Sousa
- Fernão de Magalhães, also known as Ferdinand Magellan (also to the Order of Santiago)
- Vicente Sodré
- Damião de Góis
- Pedro Teixeira
- Alexandre de Gusmão
- Alexandre Rodrigues Ferreira
- Henrique Dias
- António Filipe Camarão
- Henrique de Barros Gomes (Grand Cross)
- Jácome Ratton
- Albert Coyette
- Louis-Nicolas Davout
- Jean-Baptiste Bessières
- Albert Guille
- Guillaume Delcourt
- Ângelo Moniz da Silva Ferraz, Baron of Uruguaiana
- Prince Philip, Duke of Edinburgh (Grand Cross)
- Jules Ernest Renoux
- Leonor, Princess of Asturias (Grand Cross)

== Locations associated with the Order of Christ ==
- Tomar
- Castro Marim (seat of the order before 1357)
- Convento de Cristo
- Belém Tower
- Castle of Almourol
- Castle of Monsanto
- Castle of Castelo Branco
- Sagres (death place of Prince Henry)

== Entities using the cross of the order in their insignia ==
- Brazilian Football Confederation
- Clube de Futebol Os Belenenses (Portugal)
- Futebol Clube Cesarense
- Madeira
- National Corps of Scouts - Portuguese Catholic Scouting
- Olympic Committee of Portugal
- Portuguese Air Force
- Portuguese Athletic Federation
- Portuguese Football Federation
- Portuguese Navy
- Portuguese Roller Sports Federation
- Flag of the city of São Paulo (Brazil)
- Clube de Desportos de Vasco da Gama (Goa, Índia)
- CR Vasco da Gama (Rio de Janeiro, Brazil)

== See also ==
- History of the Order of Christ
- Honorific orders of Portugal
- Order of Christ (Holy See)
- Order of Christ (Brazil)
- Order of Christ (Kongo)

== General and cited references ==
- Guimarães, J. Vieira, A Ordem de Cristo, Lisboa, I.N., 1936
- Olival, Fernanda, The Military Orders and the Portuguese Expansion (15th to 17th Centuries), Portuguese Studies Review Monographs, Vol. 3, Peterborough: Baywolf Press and The Portuguese Studies Review, 2018.

Attribution
