= List of monarchs who lost their thrones in the 20th century =

The following monarchs either lost their thrones through deposition by a coup d'état, by a referendum which abolished their throne, or chose to abdicate during the 20th century. A list of surviving former monarchs appears at the end of the article.

See also: Abolished monarchy, List of current monarchs, List of non-sovereign monarchs who lost their thrones in the 20th century

== A ==
=== Australia ===
- King Edward VIII abdicated in 1936 in favour of his brother George VI.

=== Afghanistan ===
- King Amānullāh Khān ceased to be Emir of Afghanistan in 1926, abdicated in 1929.
- King Inayatullah Khan abdicated in 1929.
- King Habibullāh Kalakāni was overthrown in 1929.
- King Mohammed Zahir Shah was deposed in a coup in 1973.

=== Albania (Principality) ===
- Prince William fled Albania in 1914 following the outbreak of World War I (he was formally deposed in 1925).

=== Albania (Kingdom) ===
- King Zog I (president turned monarch) was deposed by Italy under Benito Mussolini in 1939.
- King Victor Emmanuel III of Italy, also King of Albania abdicated in 1943 after the Italian capitulation.
- Regent Mehdi Frashëri was deposed in 1944 when the National Liberation Movement took over Albania.

=== Austria-Hungary ===
- Emperor-King Charles I & IV was deposed in 1918, also he was deposed as a non-sovereign monarch in several lands in Austria and Hungary.

== B ==
=== Baluchistan ===
- Mir Ahmad of Kalat was the last ruler of the Khanate of Kalat in Baluchistan. On 27 March 1948 he acceded to Pakistan.

=== Bavaria ===
- King Otto was deposed by legislation in 1913, and succeeded by his cousin, Prince Regent Ludwig.
- King Ludwig III went into exile when the German Empire collapsed in 1918, but did not abdicate; Bavaria was incorporated into the new German Republic in 1919.

=== Belgium ===
- King Leopold III was forced to abdicate in 1951 in favour of his son, King Baudouin.

=== Brunei ===
- Omar Ali Saifuddien III, Sultan of Brunei, abdicated voluntarily in 1967 in favour of his son Hassanal Bolkiah.

=== Bulgaria ===
- Tsar Ferdinand I abdicated in 1918 in favour of his son Tsar Boris III, following World War I.
- Tsar Simeon II never abdicated but was exiled by the Bulgarian government following a national referendum in 1946 after which Bulgaria became a People's Republic. After the fall of communism in Bulgaria, he returned to the country in 1996, and was elected as Prime Minister in 2001, serving until 2005. He and Norodom Sihanouk of Cambodia are the only monarchs in recent history to become democratically elected heads of government.

=== Burundi ===
- King Mwambutsa IV was deposed by his son Ntare V in 1966.
- King Ntare V was deposed in 1966 in a military coup led by Michel Micombero.

== C ==
=== Cambodia ===
- King Norodom Sihanouk abdicated in 1955, then served in various important positions, including prime minister and head of state, intermittently until 1976, and was eventually restored to the kingship in 1993. He abdicated a second time in favour of his son, Norodom Sihamoni, on 7 October 2004.
- Queen Sisowath Kossamak was deposed in 1970 with the coup that ended the regime of Prince Norodom Sihanouk. The monarchy was restored in 1993 with Sihanouk (who had previously reigned from 1941 to 1955) as King.

=== Canada ===
- King Edward VIII abdicated in 1936 in favour of his brother George VI.

=== Central African Empire ===
- Bokassa I (president turned monarch), Emperor of Central African Empire, deposed in 1979.

=== Ceylon ===
- Elizabeth II ceased to be Queen of the Dominion of Ceylon in 1972 when the country became a republic called Sri Lanka.

=== China ===
- Xuantong Emperor (Puyi) was forced to abdicate in 1912 following a Republican revolution.
- Yuan Shikai (reigned as the self-proclaimed Hongxian Emperor) abdicated in 1916, a few months before his death, and lasting only 83 days on the throne.
- Xuantong Emperor (Puyi) briefly regained power but, was forced to abdicate again in 1917 following another Republican revolution.

=== Croatia ===
- Designated King Tomislav II (Prince Aimone, Duke of Spoleto) of the Independent State of Croatia abdicated in 1943 after the Italian capitulation.

== E ==
=== Egypt ===
- King Farouk abdicated in 1952 in favor of his infant son Fuad II.
- King Fuad II was deposed in 1953.

=== Ethiopia ===
- While never formally crowned Emperor, the future Iyasu V was deposed in 1916 for suspected conversion to the Muslim faith.
- Emperor Haile Selassie I was deposed following the Italian invasion of Ethiopia in 1936, and restored in 1941. He was deposed again during the communist revolution in 1975.
- King Victor Emmanuel III of Italy, also Emperor of Ethiopia, renounced his claim to the Ethiopian throne in 1943.
- Emperor Amha Selassie I, briefly emperor 1974–1975, was deposed by the abolition of the monarchy.

== F ==
=== Fiji ===
- Queen Elizabeth II ceased to be Queen of Fiji in 1987 when the country became a republic following a coup.

=== Finland (Grand Duchy) ===
- Grand Duke Nicholas II abdicated March 1917. The Russian Provisional Government continued to exercise grand ducal authority for its brief existence.

=== Finland (Kingdom) ===
- Designated King-elect Frederick Charles I (Prince Frederick Charles of Hesse), was offered but did not accede to the throne as King of Finland.

== G ==
=== Gambia ===
- Elizabeth II ceased to be Queen of the Gambia in 1970 when the country became a republic by referendum.

=== Germany ===
- Emperor Wilhelm II abdicated in 1918 following Germany's defeat in World War I and fled to the Netherlands.

=== Ghana ===
- Elizabeth II ceased to be Queen of Ghana in 1960 when the country became a republic by referendum.

=== Greece ===
- King Constantine I was deposed in 1917, succeeded by his second-born son, Alexander. He returned to the throne by referendum in 1920 after Alexander's death. Then in 1922 he abdicated in favour of his first-born son, George.
- King George II went into exile in 1923, then in 1924 he was deposed by a referendum abolishing monarchy; he returned to the throne in 1935 by referendum.
- King Constantine II was exiled in 1967 and was deposed by a referendum abolishing monarchy in 1973 (both events under dictatorial rule), during democratic rule the referendum was repeated in 1974, and the monarchy remained abolished.

=== Guyana ===
- Elizabeth II ceased to be Queen of Guyana in 1970 when the country became a republic.

== H ==
=== Hungary ===
- King Charles IV (Emperor Charles I of Austria) was deposed in 1918 when a republic was established. Following the restoration of the Hungarian monarchy in 1920, he was refused permission to "assume residency and constitutional functions" in the Kingdom by the Regent Miklós Horthy. Charles IV died in exile in 1922. His son Crown Prince Otto succeeded him but claimed that like his father he was not allowed to enter the Kingdom or assume "residency and constitutional functions", and was not recognised as King. Hungary was proclaimed a republic by the National Assembly on 1 February 1946.

=== Hyderabad ===
- Osman Ali Khan, Asaf Jah VII was deposed in 1948 when India invaded and annexed his country.

== I ==
=== Iceland ===
- King Christian X of Denmark ceased to be King of Iceland in 1944 when the country became a republic by referendum and which terminated the Personal Union with Denmark.

=== India (British) ===
- King-Emperor Edward VIII abdicated as Emperor of India in 1936 in favour of his brother George VI.
- King-Emperor George VI ceased to be Emperor of India when that title was abolished in 1948 (the country gained independence in 1947).

=== India (Dominion) ===
- King George VI ceased to be king of the dominion of India in 1950 when the country became a republic.

=== Iran (Imperial) ===
- Shah Mohammad Ali Shah Qajar deposed by the constitutionalists in 1909.
- Shah Ahmad Shah Qajar deposed by Rezā Shāh in 1925.
- Shah Rezā Shāh abdicated in 1941.
- Shah Mohammad Reza Pahlavi was deposed by revolution in 1979.

=== Iraq ===
- King Faisal II was deposed and murdered in 1958 in a military coup d'état.

=== Ireland ===
- King Edward VIII abdicated as King of the Irish Free State in 1936 in favour of his brother George VI.
- King George VI ceased to be de jure King of the Irish Free State in 1936 when the monarch's constitutional role was eliminated. This led to a period in which it was unclear whether or not the King of Ireland was indeed the Irish head of state, as he retained a role as representative of the state in foreign affairs. This situation came to an end in 1949 when the Republic of Ireland Act came into force, stripping the King of his role in foreign affairs and making the President of Ireland de jure and de facto head of state.

=== Italy ===
- King Victor Emmanuel III abdicated in 1946 in favour of his son Umberto II.
- King Umberto II was deposed by a referendum abolishing the monarchy in 1946.

== J ==
=== Jordan ===
- King Talal I ruled from July 20, 1951 upon the assassination of his father, King Abdullah I until August 11, 1952. He was forced to abdicate due to schizophrenia and was succeeded by his son, King Hussein I.

== K ==
=== Kenya ===
- Elizabeth II ceased to be Queen of Kenya in 1964 when the country became a republic.

=== Korea ===
- Emperor Gojong abdicated in 1907.
- Emperor Sunjong abdicated in 1910 by the Japan-Korea Annexation Treaty.

=== Kuwait ===
- Jaber Al-Ahmad Al-Jaber Al-Sabah, Emir of Kuwait. He was deposed on 2 August 1990, when Iraq occupied Kuwait. He returned to Kuwait as emir on 14 March 1991.

== L ==
=== Laos ===
- King Sisavang Vatthana was deposed in 1975.

=== Lesotho ===
- King Moshoeshoe II was deposed in 1990 and reinstated in 1995.
- King Letsie III took the throne upon his father's, Moshoeshoe II, deposition in 1990. He later abdicated the throne in favor of his father (1995), and then reclaimed the throne on his father's death in 1996.

=== Libya ===
- King Idris I was deposed in a coup led by Muammar Gaddafi on 1 September 1969 a day before his abdication was due to take effect.

=== Lithuania ===
- Designated King-elect Mindaugas II (Wilhelm Karl, Duke of Urach), was deposed following the end of World War I in 1918.

=== Luxembourg ===
- Grand Duchess Marie-Adélaïde abdicated in 1919 in favour of her sister Charlotte.
- Grand Duchess Charlotte abdicated in 1964 in favour of her son Jean.
- Grand Duke Jean, abdicated in 2000 in favour of his son Henri.

== M ==
=== Malawi ===
- Queen Elizabeth II ceased to be Queen of Malawi in 1966 when the country became a republic.

=== Maldives ===
- Sultan Muhammad Fareed Didi was deposed in 1968, the same year the Maldives became a republic.

=== Malta ===
- Elizabeth II ceased to be Queen of Malta in 1974 when the country became a republic.

=== Manchukuo ===
- Kangde Emperor (Puyi) was deposed in 1945, after Soviet intervention.

=== Mauritius ===
- Elizabeth II ceased to be Queen of Mauritius in 1992 when the country became a republic.

=== Mohammerah ===
- Sheikh Khaz'al al-Ka'bi deposed in 1925 by Persia.

=== Morocco ===
- Sultan Abdelaziz was deposed in 1908.
- Sultan Abdelhafid abdicated in 1912.
- Sultan Mohammed V was deposed by French in 1953 then restored in 1955.
- Sultan Mohammed Ben Aarafa abdicated in 1955.

=== Montenegro ===
- King Nicholas I was deposed in 1918 by the Podgorica Assembly, then Montenegro merged with Serbia.

== N ==
=== Nepal ===
- King Tribhuvan went into exile in 1950 and was replaced by his grandson Gyanendra, but returned in 1951 and was restored as King that year.
- King Gyanendra was removed as King in 1951 following the return of his grandfather. He returned to the throne in 2001 after the Nepalese royal massacre in which his brother Birendra was killed, but was forced to abdicate after the Constituent Assembly of Nepal with a huge majority decided to form Nepal a federal democratic Republic, hence dissolving the monarchy on May 28, 2008.

=== Netherlands ===
- Queen Wilhelmina abdicated in 1948 in favour of her daughter Juliana.
- Queen Juliana abdicated in 1980 in favour of her daughter Beatrix.

=== New Zealand ===
- King Edward VIII abdicated in 1936 in favour of his brother George VI.

=== Nigeria ===
- Elizabeth II ceased to be Queen of Nigeria in 1963 when the country became a republic.

=== Norway ===
- King Oscar II was replaced in 1905, ending the Union between Sweden and Norway.

== O ==
=== Oman ===
- Sultan Said Bin Taimur of Muscat, was deposed in 1970 by his own son Qaboos of Oman.

== P ==
=== Pakistan ===
- Elizabeth II ceased to be Queen of Pakistan in 1956 when the country became a republic.

=== Poland ===
- The portion of Poland formerly ruled by Russia was occupied by Germany and Austria in 1915 and proclaimed an independent kingdom in 1916. Archduke Charles Stephen of Austria was named King-elect, but the nation was declared a republic without ever actually having had a King in the 20th century.

=== Portugal ===
- King Manuel II fled following a 1910 revolution after which Portugal became a Republic.

=== Prussia ===
- King Wilhelm II abdicated in 1918 following Germany's defeat in World War I and fled to the Netherlands.

== Q ==
=== Qatar ===
- Shaikh 'Abdu'llah bin Jasim Al-Thani, Ruler of Qatar, abdicated in 1949.
- Sheikh Ahmad ibn `Ali Al Thani sheikh of Qatar. He was deposed in 1972.
- Khalifa bin Hamad Al Thani, Emir of Qatar, was deposed by his son Sheikh Hamad bin Khalifa on June 27, 1995.

== R ==
=== Rhodesia ===
- Elizabeth II ceased to be Queen of Rhodesia in 1970 when the country became a republic by referendum. The country and the title, however, were not recognised by international community nor The Queen herself. Rhodesia was still considered as a British colony until 1980.

=== Romania ===
- King Michael I was removed as King in favour of his father Carol II in 1930. He returned to the throne in 1940, but was forced to abdicate in 1947 by the communist government.
- King Carol II abdicated in 1940 in favour of his son Michael I.

=== Russia ===
- Emperor Nicholas II abdicated after the February Revolution of 1917, as did his named successor, his brother Grand Duke Michael (possibly known for a very short time as Michael II). Both Nicholas II and Michael separately were later murdered, as was all of Nicholas II's immediate family in 1918 (see the House of Romanov). The monarchy was abolished and replaced by a Provisional Government which was in turn overthrown months later by Lenin, which would by 1922 become the Soviet Union.

=== Rwanda ===
- King Kigeli V was deposed 1961, but never abdicated.

== S ==
=== Saudi Arabia ===
- King Saud was deposed by a coup in 1964.

=== Saxony ===
- King Friederick Augustus III abdicated when the German Empire collapsed in 1918.

=== Sierra Leone ===
- Elizabeth II ceased to be Queen of Sierra Leone in 1971 when the country became a republic.

=== Sikkim ===
- Chogyal Palden Thondup Namgyal ceased to be Chogyal (king) when India annexed Sikkim in 1975.

=== South Africa ===
- King Edward VIII abdicated in 1936 in favour of his brother George VI.
- Queen Elizabeth II ceased to be Queen of South Africa when the country became a republic by referendum in 1961.

=== Spain ===
- King Alfonso XIII went into exile in 1931 and following this, the Second Spanish Republic was proclaimed. (The monarchy was restored in 1975 under his grandson, King Juan Carlos I with the death of Dictator Francisco Franco.)

=== Syria ===
- King Faisal I was elected to be king of Greater Syria. His reign lasted from March 11, 1920 until July 25 when he was expelled by French forces.

== T ==
=== Tanganyika ===
- Elizabeth II ceased to be Queen of Tanganyika in 1962 when the country became a republic.

(Tanganyika was later united with Zanzibar, and Tanzania was formed.)

=== Thailand ===
- King Prajadhipok (Rama VII) abdicated in 1935.

=== Tibet ===
- The 14th Dalai Lama went into exile to India from Tibet during the 1959 Tibetan uprising. However Tibet had never claimed to be a sovereign state in modern history. Tibet was considered de facto independent until 1950, which she became an “Autonomous Region” under the PRC.

=== Trinidad and Tobago ===
- Elizabeth II ceased to be Queen of Trinidad and Tobago in 1976 when the country became a republic.

=== Tunisia ===
- Bey Muhammad VII al-Munsif Bey of Tunis from 1942 to 1943, when he was deposed by the Free French Forces.
- King Muhammad VIII al-Amin was deposed when Tunisia became a republic in 1957.

=== Turkey (Ottoman Empire) ===
- Sultan Abdul Hamid II was deposed by Young Turks in 1909.
- Sultan Mehmed VI was deposed following collapse of Ottoman Empire in 1922.
- Caliph Abdulmejid II was deposed in 1924.

== U ==
=== Uganda ===
- Elizabeth II ceased to be Queen of Uganda in 1963 when the country became a republic.

=== United Kingdom ===
- King Edward VIII abdicated on 11 December 1936 in favour of his brother George VI, later he became the Duke of Windsor.
  - He also abdicated from the rest of the Dominions, but is listed separately under them. The dates of abdication are the same except in Ireland, where it occurred one day earlier for technical reasons, and in South Africa, where it was one day later, i.e. on 12 December.

== V ==
=== Vietnam ===
- Emperor Bao Dai abdicated in 1945 when communists, called Viet Minh, seized control of the nation. Later on Ho Chi Minh, leader of Viet Minh, proclaimed the creation of Democratic Republic of Vietnam. Following the Geneva accords, Vietnam was partitioned and Bao Dai became Head of State (Quoc Truong) of the French controlled areas of Vietnam. He was never restored as emperor, and in 1955 was removed from office via referendum.

== W ==
=== Württemberg ===
- King William II abdicated when the German Empire collapsed in 1918.

== Y ==
=== Yemen ===
- King Muhammad al-Badr was deposed in 1962.

=== Yugoslavia ===
- King Peter II was deposed by Axis powers in 1941 and by Josip Broz Tito in 1943 (deposition formalized in 1945).

== Z ==
=== Zanzibar ===
- Sultan Sayyid Ali bin Hamud Sultan of Zanzibar, abdicated 1911
- Sultan Sayyid Jamshid bin Abdullah Sultan of Zanzibar, overthrown 1964

(Zanzibar was later united with Tanganyika, and Tanzania was formed.)

== Surviving monarchs from abolished monarchies in 20th-21st century ==
Country	Monarch	Born	Reign	Notes
Bulgaria	Tsar Simeon II	1937	28 August 1943 – 15 September 1946	He later served as Prime Minister (2001–2005).
Egypt and Sudan	King Fuad II	1952	26 July 1952 – 18 June 1953	
Nepal	King Gyanendra	1947	7 November 1950 – 8 January 1951; 4 June 2001 – 28 May 2008	
Qu'aiti	Sultan Ghalib II	1948	10 October 1966 – 17 September 1967	

== See also ==
- List of monarchs who abdicated
- List of monarchs who lost their thrones in the 21st century
- List of monarchs who lost their thrones in the 19th century
- List of monarchs who lost their thrones in the 18th century
- List of monarchs who lost their thrones in the 17th century
- List of monarchs who lost their thrones in the 16th century
- List of monarchs who lost their thrones in the 15th century
- List of monarchs who lost their thrones in the 14th century
- List of monarchs who lost their thrones in the 13th century
- List of monarchs who lost their thrones before the 13th century
