= List of historic titles of British monarchs =

This list of titles and honours of the British monarch details the current and former titles of the sovereign of the United Kingdom of Great Britain and Northern Ireland, and its predecessor states.

The present United Kingdom was formed in 1922 when the United Kingdom of Great Britain and Ireland, which had been formed in 1801 from the Kingdom of Great Britain and the Kingdom of Ireland, was partitioned to create the Irish Free State. The Kingdom of Great Britain was itself formed in 1707 from the Kingdom of England and the Kingdom of Scotland. England and Scotland had been in a personal union since 1603, while Ireland had been in a personal union with the Kingdom of England since the elevation of the Lordship of Ireland to the status of a kingdom in 1542. Wales was gradually conquered by England in the Middle Ages, beginning with the Norman invasion of Wales and concluding with the conquests of Edward I in 1277–83. Wales was legally incorporated into England between 1535 and 1542 by King Henry VIII.

The medieval monarchs of England also controlled large parts of France, particularly under the Angevin kings. Several of the listed titles are therefore French, many held as fiefs of the French Crown rather than independently. Also represented is the English claim to the France, maintained for over 400 years before being dropped after the French Revolution.

While the English claim to France was not seriously pursued after the Middle Ages, later monarchs did hold foreign titles. When William III became King alongside his wife Mary II, he maintained his Dutch titles. The Georgian kings ruled as Electors and Kings of Hanover, as well as holding the office of Arch-Treasurer of the Holy Roman Empire. These titles lapsed when Queen Victoria succeeded to the throne.

While the British Empire only gave the monarch one significant new title, that of Emperor of India, its transformation into the Commonwealth of Nations and decolonisation created many new independent states, each with a separate monarchy. Of the thirty-two realms Elizabeth II became queen of on her accession in 1952, only sixteen retain her as their monarch. All current and former Commonwealth realms are listed below.

== Titles held by the monarch of the United Kingdom ==
=== Kingdoms ===
- Monarch of the United Kingdom of Great Britain and Northern Ireland (1927 to present)

=== Lordships ===
- Lord of Mann

=== Non-hereditary titles ===
- Head of the Commonwealth (1949 to present)

=== Religious titles ===
- Defender of the Faith: granted by Pope Leo X to Henry VIII for his book Defense of the Seven Sacraments. Revoked in 1530 at the beginning of the English Reformation, but still used by British monarchs.

=== Commonwealth realms ===
These kingdoms are independent of the British Crown, but are held in personal union with the United Kingdom and follow the same rules of succession.

Kingdom	Royal standard / national flag	Date established
Canada		1985
Australia		1973
New Zealand		1974
Jamaica		1962
The Bahamas		1973
Grenada		1974
Papua New Guinea		1975
Solomon Islands		1978
Tuvalu		1978
Saint Lucia		1979
Saint Vincent and the Grenadines		1979
Belize		1981
Antigua and Barbuda		1981
Saint Kitts and Nevis		1983

=== Customary titles ===
These titles are used by custom in their respective areas, but are not formally held by the monarch.

Title	Image	Since	Notes
Duke of Lancaster		1413	Used in historic Lancashire to reflect the ownership of the Duchy of Lancaster by the monarch separately from the Crown Estate.
Duke of Normandy (Channel Islands)		1259	Used on the Channel Islands to reflect their status as the remnants of the Duchy of Normandy controlled by the Kings of England between 1066 and 1259. The role of monarch of the islands is separate from that of the United Kingdom, but there is no specific title for their sovereign.

== Titles formerly held by British monarchs ==
The following titles include those held by the monarchs of the predecessor kingdoms to the United Kingdom, and titles formerly used but now abolished.

=== Kingdoms, empires and equivalent ===
Title	Coat of arms	Date formed	Date abolished	Notes
King/Queen of the United Kingdom		1801	1922	Partitioned into the Irish Free State and United Kingdom of Great Britain and Northern Ireland.
King/Queen of Great Britain		1707	1801	Merged with Ireland to form the United Kingdom of Great Britain and Ireland.
King/Queen of England		927	1707	Merged with Scotland to form Great Britain.
King/Queen of Scotland		843	1707	Merged with England to form Great Britain.
King/Queen of Ireland		1542	1801	Merged with Great Britain to form the United Kingdom of Great Britain and Ireland.
King/Queen of France		1422 (disputed)	1453 (disputed)	Claimed from 1340 to 1360 and 1369–1801 by the Kings of England and their successors. Henry VI disputedly ruled France as Henry II of France but was ultimately defeated by Charles VII of France as part of culmination of the Hundred Years' War.
Stadtholder of Holland, Zeeland, Utrecht, Gelderland and Overijssel		1689	1702	William III had held the office of Stadholder as leader of the Dutch Republic since 1672.
King of Hanover		1814	1837	Successor to the Electorate of Brunswick-Lüneburg. Held by the Kings of the United Kingdom from 1814 to 1837. Male-preference Semi-Salic law prevents Queen Victoria from inheriting the Kingdom.
Emperor/Empress of India		1876	1948	Created for Queen Victoria and abandoned by George VI.

=== Principalities ===
Principality	Coat of Arms	Date formed	Date abolished	Notes
Chester		1398	1399	Used exclusively by Richard II
Orange		1650	1702	Title of William III

=== Duchies ===
Title	Coat of Arms	Date acquired	Date lost	Notes
Duke of Aquitaine		1154 jure uxoris 1189 suo jure	1451	Gained by the marriage of Duchess Eleanor of Aquitaine to King Henry II in 1154 and subsequently inherited by Richard I in his own right. Lost by Henry VI during the closing phases of the Hundred Years' War.
Duke of Normandy (Continental Normandy)		1066	1259	Duke William II of Normandy conquered England in 1066. Henry III renounced his claim to Normandy (besides the Channel Islands) in the Treaty of Paris.

=== Electorates ===
- Elector of Brunswick-Lüneburg: held by the Kings of Great Britain / the United Kingdom from 1714 to 1807. Merged into the Kingdom of Westphalia during the Napoleonic Wars and re-established as the Kingdom of Hanover in 1814.

=== Counties ===
- Count of Anjou: held from the King of France by Henry II, Richard I, and John, Kings of England.
- Count of Ponthieu: held from the King of France by Edward II and Edward III. Inherited from Eleanor of Castile, wife of Edward I.
- Count of Boulogne: held by Stephen.

=== Lordships ===
- Lord of Ireland: used by the Kings of England between 1171 and 1542 to signify their sovereignty over parts of Ireland. Elevated to a Kingdom in 1542.

=== Religious titles ===
- Supreme Head of the Church of England: title used by Henry VIII and Edward VI to reflect their status as head of the English Church.

=== Offices of the Holy Roman Empire ===
- Arch-Treasurer
- Prince-Elector

=== Commonwealth realms ===
These Kingdoms were independent of the British Crown, but were held in personal union with the United Kingdom and followed the same rules of succession. Monarchies listed under 'Queen' only had Elizabeth II as their sovereign, and thus never had a reigning king. Dates indicate the year the monarchy was formed and the year of its dissolution.

- Monarch of the Irish Free State/Ireland: 1931–37 (in practice), –1949 (legally)
- Queen of Ceylon: 1948–72
- King of India: 1947–1950
- Queen of Fiji: 1970–87
- Queen of the Gambia: 1965–70
- Queen of Ghana: 1957–60
- Queen of Guyana: 1966–70
- Queen of Kenya: 1963–4
- Queen of Malawi: 1964–6
- Queen of Malta: 1964–74
- Queen of Mauritius: 1968–92
- Queen of Nigeria: 1960–63
- Queen of Pakistan: 1947–56
- Queen of Sierra Leone: 1961–71
- Queen of South Africa: 1931–61
- Queen of Tanganyika: 1961–62
- Queen of Trinidad and Tobago: 1962–76
- Queen of Uganda: 1962–3
- Queen of Barbados: 1966–2021

== See also ==
- Titles of the Prince of Wales
