= The Gambia (1965–1970) =

West African independent sovereign state

Coordinates: 13.5000°N 15.5000°W

- 1965–1970
- Flag Coat of arms
- Motto: "Progression, Peace, Progress"
- Anthem: For The Gambia Our Homeland
- Location of the Gambia (red) in Western Africa
- Capital: Bathurst
- Government: Unitary parliamentary constitutional monarchy
- Monarch
  - 1965–1970: Elizabeth II
- Governor-General
  - 1965–1966: Sir John Paul
  - 1966–1970: Sir Farimang Singhateh
- Prime Minister
  - 1965–1970: Sir Dawda Jawara
- Historical era: Cold War
  - Independence: 18 February 1965
  - Republic: 24 April 1970
- Currency: Gambian Pound (from 1966)
Preceded by	Succeeded by
Gambia Colony and Protectorate	The Gambia

Between 1965 and 1970, the Gambia was a monarchy that shared its head of state with the United Kingdom and other states headed by Queen Elizabeth II. It was a predecessor to the modern-day republic of the Gambia.

The Gambia was given independence from Britain in 1965 under the Gambia Independence Act 1964, which unified the British Crown Colony and Protectorate of the Gambia into an independent sovereign state. The British monarch, Elizabeth II, remained head of state of the Gambia, which shared its Sovereign with other Commonwealth realms. The Queen's constitutional roles were mostly delegated to the Governor-General of the Gambia. The Governors-General who held office in the Gambia were:

1. Sir John Warburton Paul (18 February 1965 – 9 February 1966)
2. Sir Farimang Mamadi Singateh (9 February 1966 – 24 April 1970)

After two referendums on the issue, the monarchy was abolished on 24 April 1970, when the Gambia became a republic within the Commonwealth. The first referendum in 1965, with 65.85% in favour and 34.15% against, failed to reach the two-thirds majority needed to pass. The second in 1970 with 70.45% percent of the Gambian people voting in favour of a republic and 29.55% against, was successful. The Gambia adopted a new constitution in 1970 which abolished the monarchy. Sir Dawda Jawara, the prime minister (and head of government) from 1965, became the first president of the Gambia.

Queen Elizabeth II did not visit the Gambia between 1965 and 1970. Her last visit was between 3–5 December 1961.
