= Commonwealth realm =

Sovereign states where Charles III is the head of state

Current Commonwealth realms Territories and dependencies of current realms Former realms and dominions that are now republics

A Commonwealth realm is a sovereign state in the Commonwealth of Nations that has the same constitutional monarch and head of state as the other realms. The current monarch is King Charles III. Except for the United Kingdom, in each of the realms the monarch is represented by a governor-general. The phrase Commonwealth realm is an informal description not used in any law.

As of 2026, there are 15 Commonwealth realms: Antigua and Barbuda, Australia and its external territories, The Bahamas, Belize, Canada, Grenada, Jamaica, the Realm of New Zealand, (Note: New Zealand and its associated states, the Cook Islands and Niue, along with its territories Tokelau and the Ross Dependency, make up the Realm of New Zealand.) Papua New Guinea, Saint Kitts and Nevis, Saint Lucia, Saint Vincent and the Grenadines, Solomon Islands, Tuvalu, and the United Kingdom and its territories. While the Commonwealth of Nations has 56 independent member states, only these 15 have Charles III as head of state. He is also Head of the Commonwealth, a ceremonial role.

The notion of these states sharing the same person as their monarch traces back to 1867 when Canada became the first "dominion": a largely self-governing nation that was nevertheless a part of the British Empire. Others, such as Australia (1901) and New Zealand (1907), followed. With the growing independence of the dominions in the 1920s, the Balfour Declaration of 1926 established the Commonwealth of Nations and that the nations were considered "equal in status ... though united by a common allegiance to the Crown". The Statute of Westminster 1931 further set the terms: of the relationship between the realms; and of their broader sharing of the monarch, including a convention that any alteration to the line of succession in any one country must be voluntarily approved by all the others.

After the significant and costly mutual defence assistance provided by empire nations during the Second World War, the modern Commonwealth of Nations was formally constituted by the London Declaration. In 1950, India became a republic without leaving the Commonwealth. This left seven independent nations sharing the Crown: Australia, Canada, Ceylon (now Sri Lanka), New Zealand, Pakistan, South Africa, and the United Kingdom. Since then, new realms have been created as former colonies and dependencies have gained independence. Saint Kitts and Nevis is the youngest extant realm, having achieved independence—while retaining the monarch—in 1983. Some former realms have transitioned to presidential republics: most recently, Barbados changed from realm to republic in 2021.

== List ==
There are currently 15 Commonwealth realms across three continents (nine in North America, five in Oceania, and one, the UK, in Europe). Together, these realms have a population of more than 150 million and a combined land area of 18.7 million km^{2} (7.2 million sq mi). (Note: Figures totalled from member state profiles at the Commonwealth of Nations secretariat, rounded to the nearest 100,000.)

| Country | Population (2021) | Date (Note: Dates indicate the year each country became a dominion or Commonwealth realm.) | Governor-general | Prime minister |
|---|---|---|---|---|
| Antigua and Barbuda (monarchy) | 93,219 | 1981 | Rodney Williams | Gaston Browne |
| Australia (monarchy) | 25,921,089 | 1901 | Sam Mostyn | Anthony Albanese |
| Bahamas (monarchy) | 407,906 | 1973 | Cynthia A. Pratt | Philip Davis |
| Belize (monarchy) | 400,031 | 1981 | Froyla Tzalam | Johnny Briceño |
| Canada (monarchy) | 38,155,012 | 1867 | Louise Arbour | Mark Carney |
| Grenada (monarchy) | 124,610 | 1974 | Cécile La Grenade | Dickon Mitchell |
| Jamaica (monarchy) | 2,827,695 | 1962 | Patrick Allen | Andrew Holness |
| New Zealand (monarchy) | 5,129,727 | 1907 | Cindy Kiro | Christopher Luxon |
| Papua New Guinea (monarchy) | 9,949,437 | 1975 | Bob Dadae | James Marape |
| Saint Kitts and Nevis (monarchy) | 47,606 | 1983 | Marcella Liburd | Terrance Drew |
| Saint Lucia (monarchy) | 179,651 | 1979 | Felix Finisterre (acting) | Philip J. Pierre |
| Saint Vincent and the Grenadines (monarchy) | 104,332 | 1979 | Stanley John | Godwin Friday |
| Solomon Islands (monarchy) | 707,851 | 1978 | David Tiva Kapu | Matthew Wale |
| Tuvalu (monarchy) | 11,204 | 1978 | Temukisa Auina Penehuro Hauma | Feleti Teo |
| United Kingdom (Note: Guernsey, the Isle of Man, and Jersey—the Crown Dependencies—are self-governing possessions of the British Crown, under the sovereignty of the King of the United Kingdom. Together with the UK, these make up the British Islands.) (monarchy) | 67,281,039 | 1801 | None (Note: Due to the monarch residing in the United Kingdom, there is no need for a viceroy to represent them and carry out the functions of the crown on their behalf, as such there is no Governor General for the UK. In the event of them being absent from the UK they may, temporarily, delegate certain constitutional duties to Counsellors of State) | Andy Burnham |

== Interrelationship ==
The Commonwealth realms are sovereign states. They are united only in their voluntary connection with the institution of the monarchy, the succession, and the King himself; the person of the sovereign and the Crown were said in 1936 to be "the most important and vital link" between the dominions. Political scientist Peter Boyce called this grouping of countries associated in this manner "an achievement without parallel in the history of international relations or constitutional law." Terms such as personal union, a form of personal union, (Note: F.R. Scott stated, "the common kinship within the British group today establishes a form of personal union, the members of which are legally capable of following different international policies even in time of war.") and shared monarchy, among others, (Note: W.Y. Elliott stated, "if a personal union be chosen, the Crown will be forced to act on the king's own discretion [and], since personal discretion in a modern monarch is unthinkable, the only alternative would be a league of states with a common, but symbolic crown", and Alexander N. Sack stated, "whatever the future development of the British Commonwealth may be, [it] can be described as that of associations or unions of states, as distinguished from 'personal' unions, on the one hand, and federal States, on the other.) have all been advanced as definitions since the beginning of the Commonwealth itself, though there has been no agreement on which term is most accurate.

Under the Balfour Declaration of 1926, dominions were proclaimed to be "equal in status, in no way subordinate one to another in any aspect of their domestic or external affairs, though united by a common allegiance to the Crown" and the monarch is the leader "equally, officially, and explicitly of separate, autonomous realms". Andrew Michie wrote in 1952 that "Elizabeth II embodies in her own person many monarchies: she is Queen of Great Britain, but she is equally Queen of Canada, Australia, New Zealand, Pakistan, South Africa, and Ceylon ... It is now possible for Elizabeth II to be, in practice as well as theory, equally Queen in all her realms." Still, Boyce holds the contrary opinion that the crowns of all the non-British realms are "derivative, if not subordinate" to the crown of the United Kingdom.

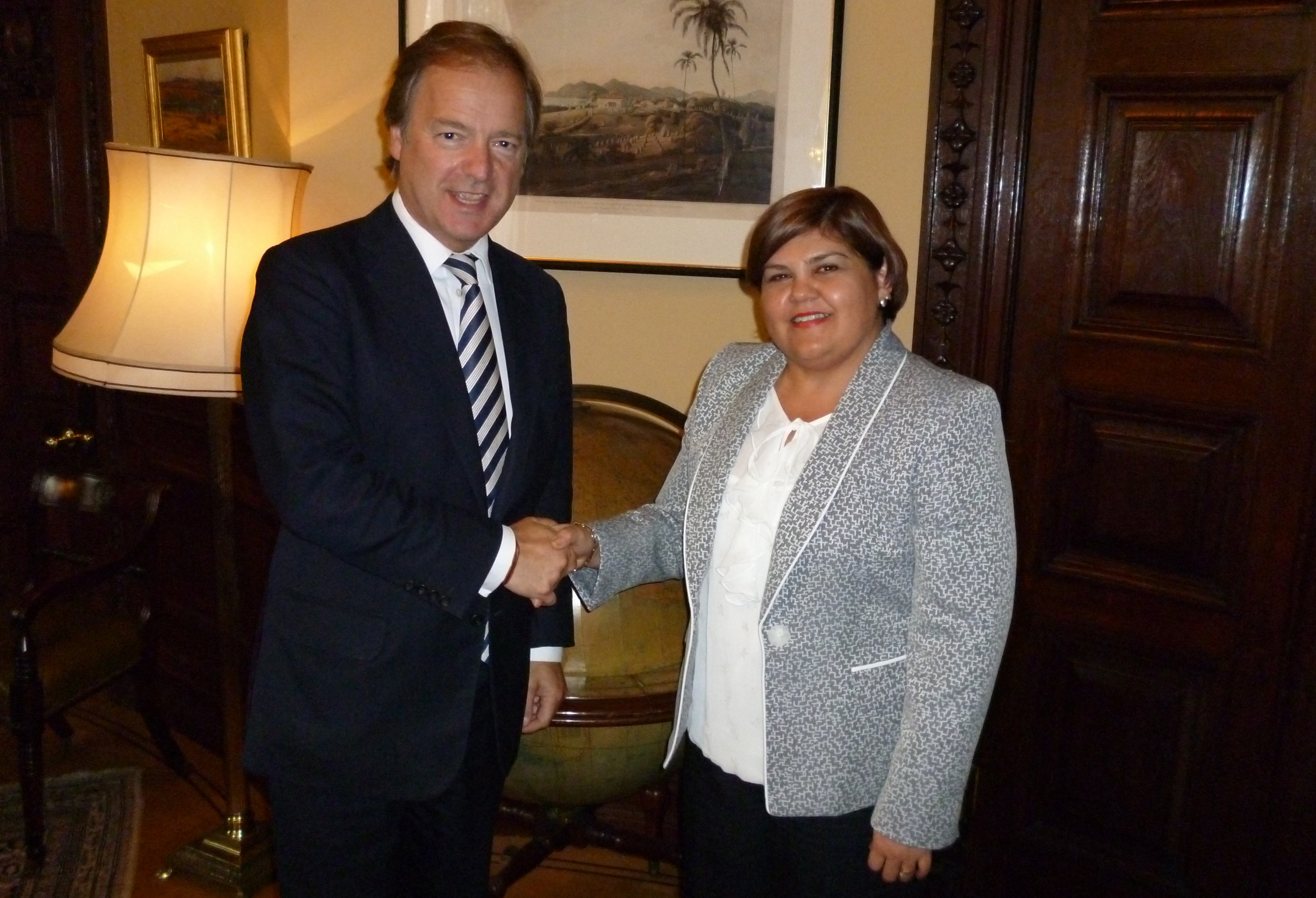
High Commissioner of Belize to the UK meets with the British Minister of State for Foreign and Commonwealth Affairs. High Commissioners act as liaisons between the governments of the Commonwealth realms.

Since each realm has the same person as its monarch, the diplomatic practice of exchanging ambassadors with letters of credence and recall from one head of state to another does not apply. Instead, high commissioners between Commonwealth realms use letters of introduction exchanged between heads of government. Diplomatic precedence among heads of mission within the same class is determined according to the date and time at which they take up their functions. At Commonwealth events held in the United Kingdom, national flags follow the Commonwealth order of precedence prescribed in UK flag protocol.

Conflicts of interest have arisen from this relationship amongst independent states. Some have been minor diplomatic matters, such as the monarch expressing on the advice of one of his/her cabinets views that counter those of another of his/her cabinets. (Note: During a British state visit to Jordan in 1984, Queen Elizabeth II made a speech expressing opinions of her British Cabinet that countered the views of her Australian Cabinet, though the Queen was evidently not representing Australia at that time. Similarly, Elizabeth II undertook a visit to Latin America to promote British goods at the same time that a Canadian ministerial trip was underway in the same region to promote Canadian products.) More serious issues have arisen with respect to armed conflict, where the monarch, as head of state of two different realms, may be simultaneously at war and at peace with a third country, or even at war with themself as head of two hostile nations. (Note: On 3 September 1939, the United Kingdom declared war on Nazi Germany, but it was only on 6 September that, under the articles of the Statute of Westminster, the Union of South Africa did same, followed by Canada on 10 September. Therefore, from 3 to 10 September, King George VI, as king of the United Kingdom, South Africa and Canada, was both at war and at peace with Germany. During the Indo-Pakistani War of 1947, George VI was head of state of both warring nations. In 1983, Elizabeth II was monarch of Grenada when her governor-general there requested the invasion of the country by a number of other Caribbean states, including some that were also realms of the Queen; an undertaking that was opposed by a number of Queen Elizabeth II's other governments, such as those of the United Kingdom, Canada and Belize.)

== The Crown's role ==
The evolution of dominions into realms resulted in the Crown having a shared and a separate character, with one person equally monarch of each state and acting as such in right of a particular realm as a distinct legal person guided only by the advice of the cabinet of that jurisdiction. This means that in different contexts, the term Crown may refer to the extra-national institution associating all 15 countries, or to the Crown in each realm considered separately. (Note: One Canadian constitutional scholar, Richard Toporoski, stated on this: "I am perfectly prepared to concede, even happily affirm, that the British Crown no longer exists in Canada, but that is because legal reality indicates to me that in one sense, the British Crown no longer exists in Britain: the Crown transcends Britain just as much as it does Canada. One can therefore speak of 'the British Crown' or 'the Canadian Crown' or indeed the 'Barbadian' or 'Tuvaluan' Crown, but what one will mean by the term is the Crown acting or expressing itself within the context of that particular jurisdiction".) In Australia, it has been suggested that the Crown is further divided, with it possible that the monarchy in each of the states is a separate institution, equal in status to each other. The monarchy is, therefore, no longer an exclusively British institution.

From a cultural standpoint, the sovereign's name, image and other royal symbols unique to each nation are visible in the emblems and insignia of governmental institutions and militia. Elizabeth II's effigy, for example, appears on coins and banknotes in some countries, and an oath of allegiance to the King is typically required from politicians, judges, military members and new citizens. By 1959, it was being asserted by Buckingham Palace officials that the Queen was "equally at home in all her realms".

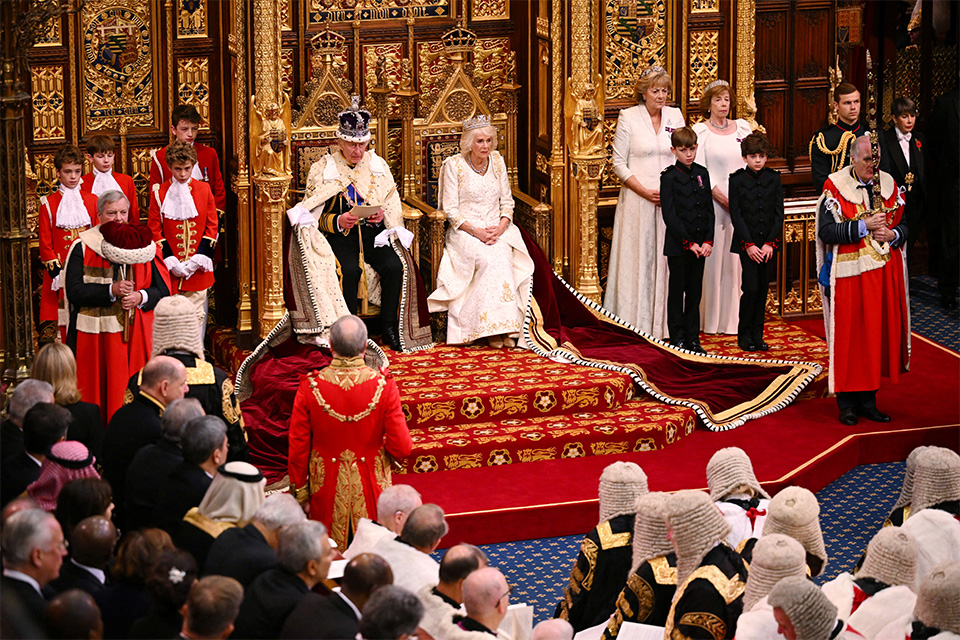
Charles III opening a session of parliament in the United Kingdom in 2023 (top) and in Canada in 2025 (bottom)

Robert Hazell and Bob Morris argued in 2017 that there are five aspects to the monarchy of the Commonwealth realms: the constitutional monarchy, including the royal prerogative and the use thereof on the advice of local ministers or according to convention or statute law; the national monarchy, comprising the functions of the head of state beyond the purely constitutional; the international monarchy, where the monarch is head of state in the 15 realms and holds the position of head of the Commonwealth; the religious monarchy, meaning the sovereign as head of the Church of England and his relationship with the Presbyterian Church of Scotland; and the welfare/service monarchy, wherein the sovereign and other members of the royal family give their patronage to charities and other elements of civil society.

=== Succession and regency ===
To guarantee the continuity of multiple states sharing the same person as monarch, the preamble of the Statute of Westminster 1931 laid out a convention that any alteration to the line of succession in any one country must be voluntarily approved by the parliaments of all the realms. (Note: See Sue v Hill.) This convention was first applied in 1936 when the British government conferred with the dominion governments during the Edward VIII abdication crisis. Prime Minister of Canada William Lyon Mackenzie King pointed out that the Statute of Westminster required Canada's request and consent to any legislation passed by the British parliament before it could become part of Canada's laws and affect the line of succession in Canada. Sir Maurice Gwyer, first parliamentary counsel in the UK, reflected this position, stating that the Act of Settlement was a part of the law in each dominion. Though today the Statute of Westminster is law only in Canada, Australia and the United Kingdom, the convention of approval from the other realms was reasserted by the Perth Agreement of 2011, in which all 16 realms at the time agreed in principle to change the succession rule to absolute primogeniture, to remove the restriction on the monarch being married to a Catholic, and to reduce the number of members of the Royal Family who need the monarch's permission to marry. These changes came into effect on 26 March 2015. Alternatively, a Commonwealth realm may choose to cease being such by making its throne the inheritance of a different royal house or by becoming a republic, actions to which, though they alter the country's royal succession, the convention does not apply.

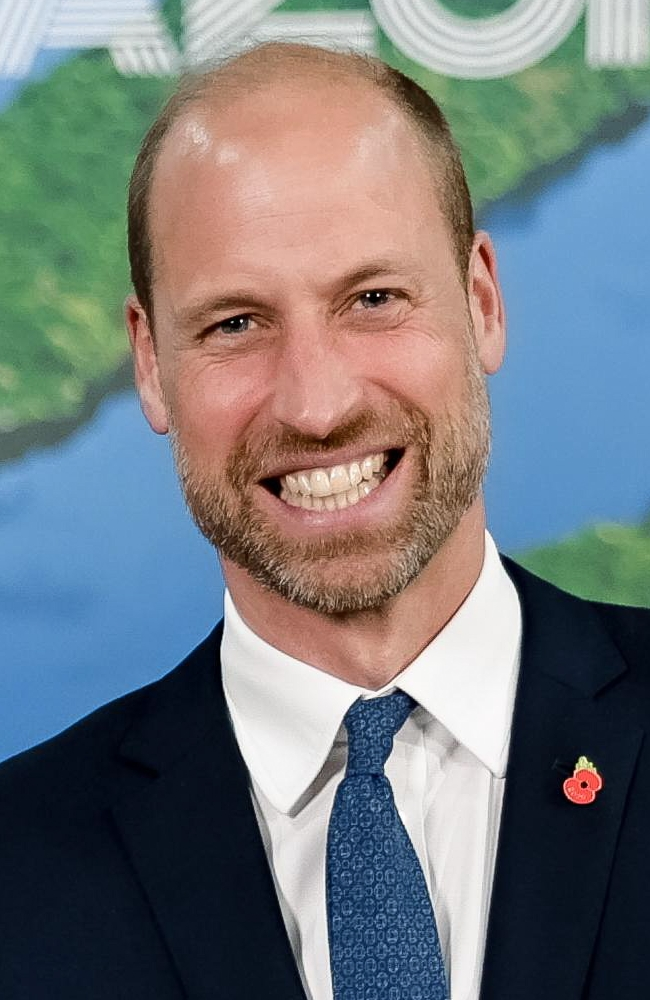
William, Prince of Wales, the present heir apparent in all of the Commonwealth realms

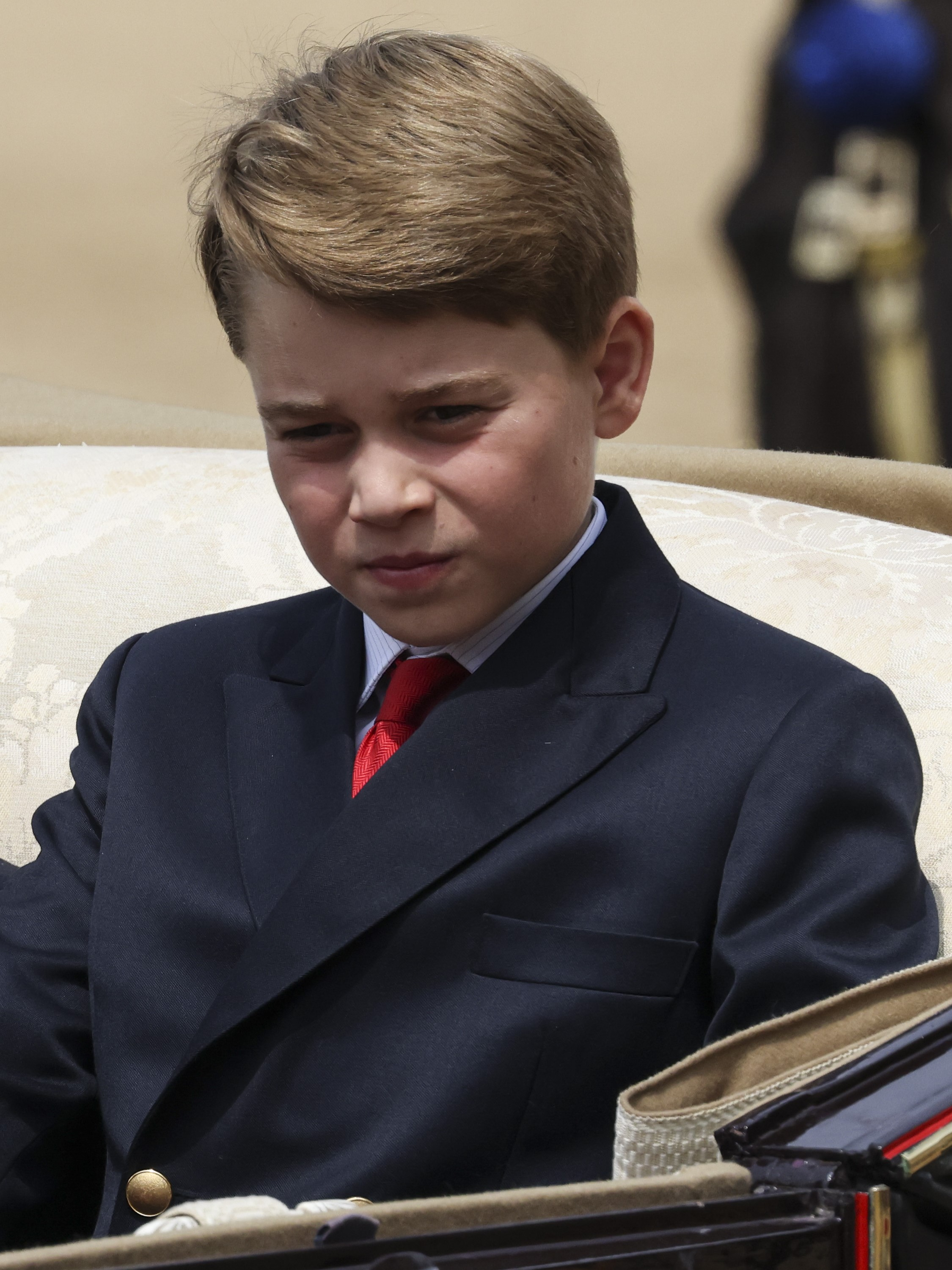
Prince George, second in the line of succession

Agreement among the realms does not mean the succession laws cannot diverge. During the abdication crisis in 1936, the United Kingdom passed His Majesty's Declaration of Abdication Act with the approval of the parliament of Australia and the governments of the remaining dominions. (Canada, New Zealand and South Africa gave parliamentary assent later.) The act effected Edward's abdication in the United Kingdom on 11 December; as the Canadian government had requested and consented to the act becoming part of Canadian law, and Australia and New Zealand had then not yet adopted the Statute of Westminster, the abdication took place in those countries on the same day. The parliament of South Africa passed its own legislation—His Majesty King Edward the Eighth's Abdication Act, 1937—which backdated the abdication there to 10 December. The Irish Free State recognised the king's abdication with the Executive Authority (External Relations) Act 1936 on 12 December. According to Anne Twomey, this demonstrated "the divisibility of the Crown in the personal, as well as the political, sense". For E. H. Coghill, writing as early as 1937, it proved that the convention of a common line of succession "is not of imperative force" and Kenneth John Scott asserted in 1962 that it ended the "convention that statutory uniformity on these subjects would be maintained in the parts of the Commonwealth that continued to owe allegiance to the Crown".

Today, some realms govern succession by their own domestic laws, while others, either by written clauses in their constitution or by convention, stipulate that whoever is monarch of the United Kingdom is automatically also monarch of that realm. It is generally agreed that any unilateral alteration of succession by the UK would not have effect in all the realms. (Note: Noel Cox stated, "any alteration by the United Kingdom Parliament in the law touching the succession to the throne would, except perhaps in the case of Papua New Guinea, be ineffective to alter the succession to the throne in respect of, and in accordance with the law of, any other independent member of the Commonwealth which was within the Queen's realms at the time of such alteration. Therefore it is more than mere constitutional convention that requires that the assent of the parliament of each member of the Commonwealth within the Queen's realms be obtained in respect of any such alteration in the law." Richard Toporoski similarly stated, "if, let us say, an alteration were to be made in the United Kingdom to the Act of Settlement 1701, providing for the succession of the Crown. It is my opinion that the domestic constitutional law of Australia or Papua New Guinea, for example, would provide for the succession in those countries of the same person who became Sovereign of the United Kingdom ... If the British law were to be changed and we [Canada] did not change our law ... the Crown would be divided. The person provided for in the new law would become king or queen in at least some realms of the Commonwealth; Canada would continue on with the person who would have become monarch under the previous law ...)

Following the accession of George VI to the throne, the United Kingdom created legislation that provided for a regency if the monarch was not of age or incapacitated. During debate that law, Sir John Simon opined that each Dominion would have to decide if it needed to legislate with respect to a regency; though, such legislation would not be required until the occasion arose. This was because the governors-general could still perform viceregal functions during a regency in Britain, including giving royal assent to any Dominion law giving effect to a regency in that Dominion. In the United Kingdom, on the other hand, legislation was needed in advance because, otherwise, there would be no one to give assent to a regency law if the sovereign were incapacitated. Though input was sought from the Dominions on the matter, all declined to make themselves bound by the British legislation, agreeing with Simon. Tuvalu later incorporated this principle into its constitution. New Zealand included in its Constitution Act 1986 a clause specifying that, should a regent be installed in the United Kingdom, that individual would carry out the functions of the monarch of New Zealand.

=== Monarch ===
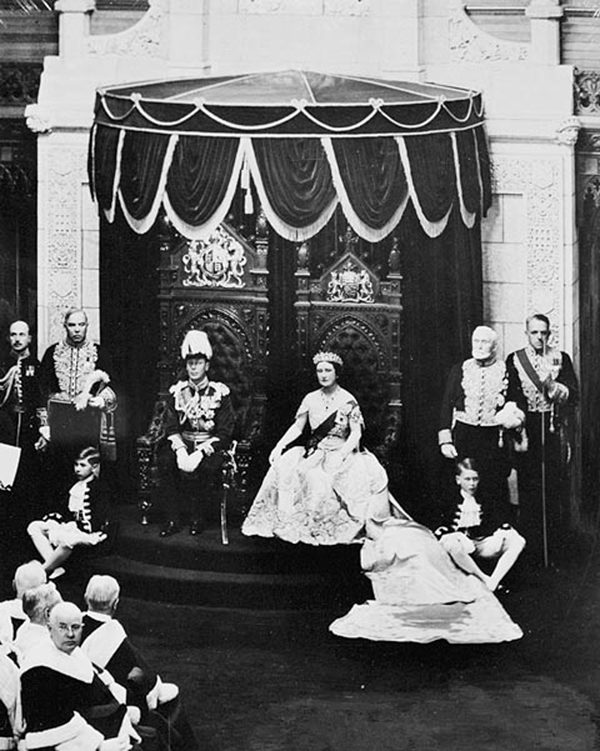
King George VI, with Queen Elizabeth, grants royal assent to bills in the Senate of Canada, May 1939.

The sovereign resides in the oldest realm, the United Kingdom. The king appoints viceroys to perform most of the constitutional and ceremonial duties on his behalf in the other realms: in each, a governor-general as his personal national representative, as well as a lieutenant governor as his representative in each of the Canadian provinces and governor as his representative in each of the Australian states. These appointments are made on the advice of the prime minister of the country or the premier of the province or state concerned, though this process may have additional requirements. (Note: In Papua New Guinea and Solomon Islands, the governor-general is elected by the national legislature. In Tuvalu, the prime minister must consult the legislature in confidence prior to nominating a candidate.) The extent to which specific additional powers are reserved exclusively for the monarch varies from realm to realm. On occasions of national importance, the King may be advised to perform in person his constitutional duties, such as granting royal assent or issuing a royal proclamation. Otherwise, all royal powers, including the royal prerogative, are carried out on behalf of the sovereign by the relevant viceroy. In the United Kingdom, the king appoints Counsellors of State to perform his constitutional duties in his absence.

Similarly, the monarch will perform ceremonial duties in the Commonwealth realms to mark historically significant events. Citizens in Commonwealth realms may request birthday or wedding anniversary messages to be sent from the sovereign. This is available for 100th, 105th and beyond for birthdays; and 60th ("Diamond"), 65th, 70th ("Platinum") and beyond for wedding anniversaries.

==== Religion ====
It is only in England and Scotland that the King plays a role in organised religion.

In England he acts as the Supreme Governor of the Church of England and nominally appoints its bishops and archbishops. In Scotland, he is a member of the Church of Scotland and swears an oath to uphold and protect the Church of Scotland. He also sends a Lord High Commissioner as his representative to meetings of the church's General Assembly, when he is not personally in attendance.

== Titles ==
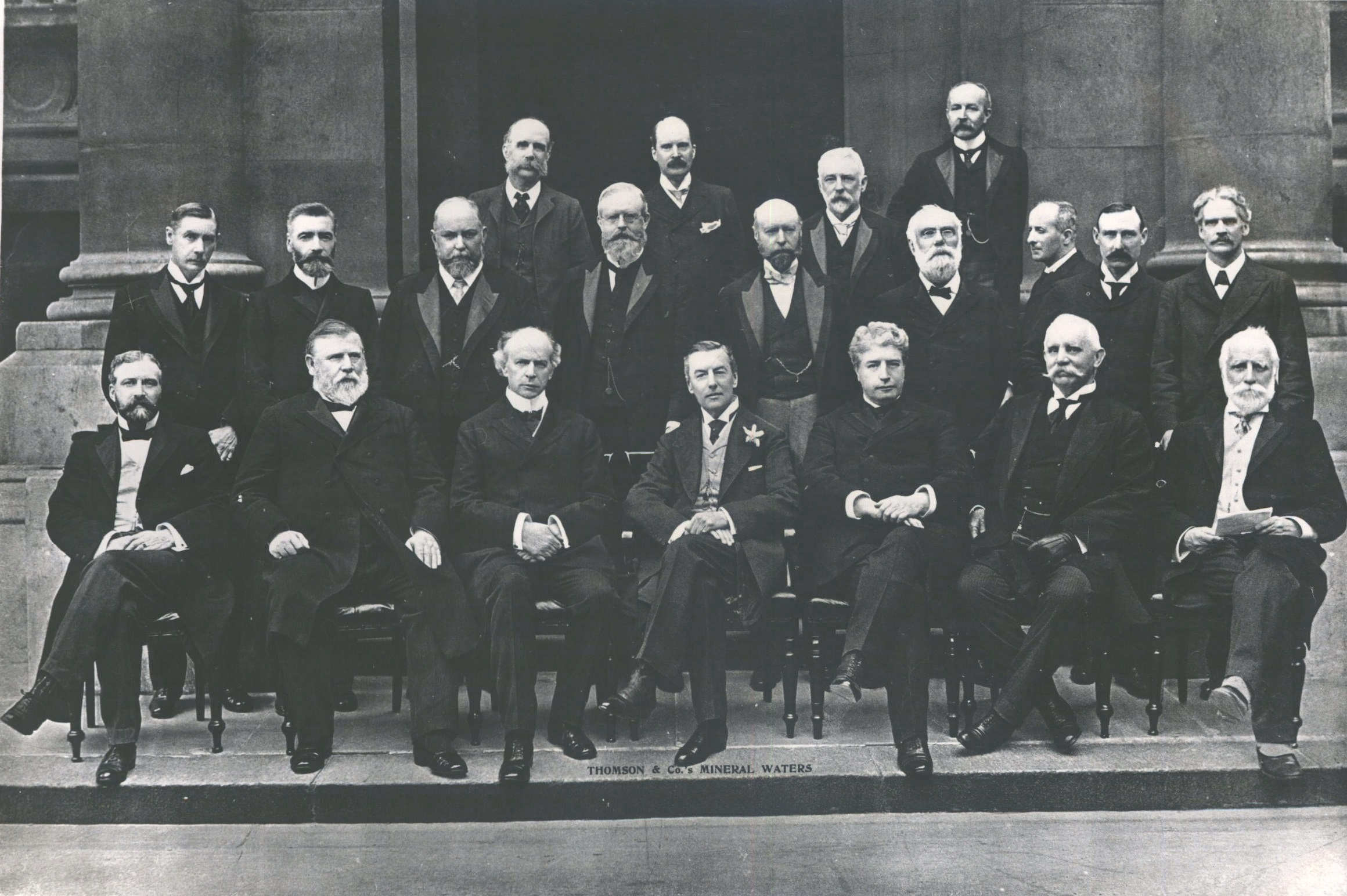
Delegates at the Colonial Conference of 1902

Until the early part of the 20th century, the monarch's title throughout the British Empire was determined exclusively by the Parliament of the United Kingdom. As the dominions gained importance, the British government began to consult their governments on how the monarch should be titled. Ahead of the coronation of King Edward VII in 1902, the British Secretary of State for the Colonies, Joseph Chamberlain, suggested the King have the title King of Great Britain and Ireland and of Greater Britain Beyond the Seas. Canadian officials preferred explicitly mentioning the dominions: King of Great Britain and Ireland, Emperor of India, King of Canada, Australasia, South Africa and all the British Dominions Beyond the Seas, or, more simply, King of all the British Dominions Beyond the Seas. The King favoured the latter suggestion, which was adopted as [Edward VII] of the United Kingdom of Great Britain and Ireland and of the British Dominions beyond the Seas King.

By 1926, following the issuance of the Balfour Declaration, it was determined that the changes in the nature of the Empire needed to be reflected in King George V's title (something the King felt to be a "bore"). This led to the Royal and Parliamentary Titles Act 1927; though, again, this applied one title to the King across the whole Empire. The preamble to the Statute of Westminster 1931 established the convention requiring the consent of all the dominions' parliaments, as well as that of the United Kingdom, to any alterations to the monarch's style and title. This first came into play when the Royal and Parliamentary Titles Act was amended in 1948, by domestic law in Britain and each of the dominions, to remove George VI's title Emperor of India. Within the year, discussions about rewording the monarch's title began again when Ireland repealed legislation conferring functions on the king. The governments of Pakistan and Canada this time wanted more substantial changes, leading South Africa and Ceylon to also, along with Pakistan, request the elimination of the terms grace of God and defender of the faith; by the will of the people was suggested as a replacement. All that was agreed at the Commonwealth Prime Ministers' Conference in 1949 was that each of George VI's countries should have a different title, but with common elements, and it would be sufficient for each realm's parliament to pass a local law.

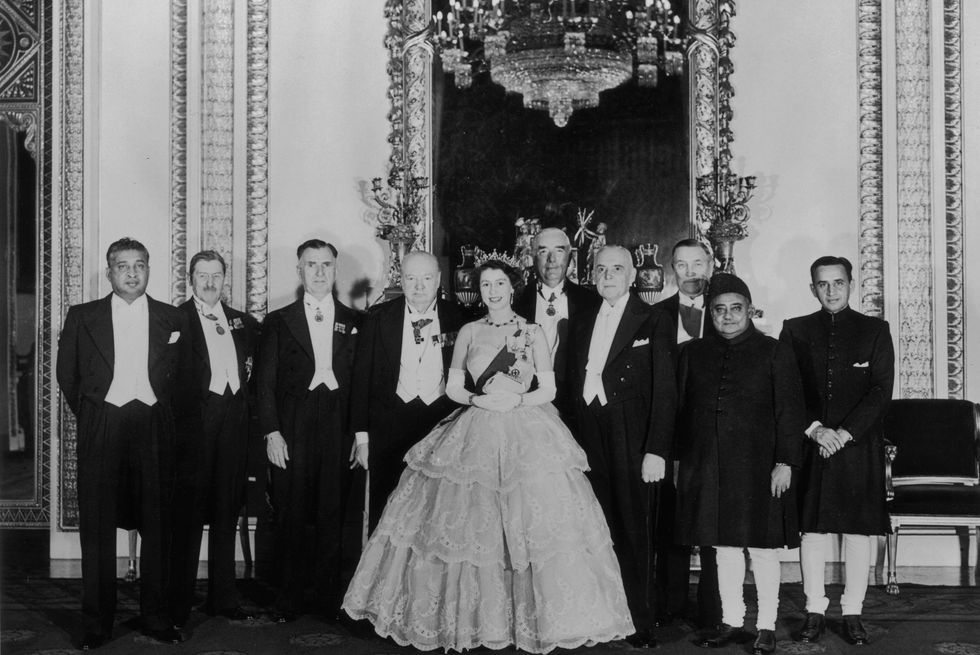
Queen Elizabeth II with the Commonwealth prime ministers during their conference in December 1952

The matter went unresolved until Elizabeth II became queen in 1952, upon which the realms issued their respective accession proclamations using different titles for their monarch. Debate ensued thereafter. The Australian government preferred that the monarch's title name all of the realms, but said it would accept Elizabeth II (by the Grace of God) of the United Kingdom of Great Britain and Northern Ireland, [name of realm], and all of her other Realms and Territories Queen, Head of the Commonwealth (Defender of the Faith). The South African government objected, stating that did not express the equality of status among the realms. Canadian officials wanted the word queen to precede the name of the realm so as to form the term Queen of Canada, which they felt expressed Elizabeth's distinct role as Canada's sovereign. There was even discussion about the placement of a comma following the Queen's name and regnal number, with the Secretary of State for Commonwealth Relations advising the use of punctuation was appropriate, as the term by the grace of God had been used in conjunction with the title king or queen since the reign of William II in the 11th century, whereas it had no such association with the position of head of the Commonwealth; so, Elizabeth II was queen by the grace of God, but her position as head of the Commonwealth was a secular arrangement.

In the end, it was decided the common wording in the titles was to be Queen of her other Realms and Territories, Head of the Commonwealth. Regardless, Ceylon and South Africa used Queen of [Ceylon/South Africa] and her other Realms and Territories, omitting by the grace of God and defender of the faith, while Australia, Canada, and New Zealand opted for of the United Kingdom, [Australia/Canada/New Zealand] and her other Realms and Territories Queen, keeping by the grace of God and defender of the faith. Pakistan's Royal Style and Titles Act simply titled the Queen as Queen of the United Kingdom and of Her other Realms and Territories, Head of the Commonwealth.

After Ghana gained independence and became a Commonwealth realm in 1957, its parliament passed the Royal Style and Titles Act 1957, which followed the example of Ceylon and South Africa by giving Elizabeth the title Elizabeth the Second, Queen of Ghana and of Her other Realms and Territories, Head of the Commonwealth. Each new realm thereafter did the same. In 1973 Australia removed reference to the United Kingdom, followed by New Zealand the next year. By the time of Elizabeth's death in 2022, aside from the United Kingdom itself, only Canada retained mention of the United Kingdom in the monarch's title and only Canada and New Zealand retained a reference to the monarch as Defender of the Faith. The Canadian parliament, in 2023, passed legislation that removed those references. The bill received royal assent on 22 June 2023; a proclamation of the new title was issued on 8 January 2024.

== Flags ==
The Royal Standard of William, Prince of Wales, in the United Kingdom

The Royal Standard of William, Prince of Wales, in Canada

Some members of the royal family have different heraldic standards for use in the appropriate realm.

Queen Elizabeth II employed various royal standards to mark her presence, the particular one used depending on which realm she was in or acting on behalf of at the time. All are heraldic banners incorporating the arms for that state and, save for those of the UK, were defaced in the centre with the device from the Queen's Personal Flag. The Queen would use that personal flag in realms where she did not have a royal standard. Many other members of the royal family have their own personal standards; the Prince of Wales, Princess Royal, Duke of York and Duke of Edinburgh also have one each for Canada. Those without their own standard use a specific ermine-bordered banner of either the British, Scottish, or, when in or acting on behalf of Canada, Canadian royal arms.

The governors-general throughout the Commonwealth realms also each use a personal flag, which, like that of the sovereign, passes to each successive occupant of the office. Most feature a lion passant atop a St. Edward's royal crown with the name of the country across a scroll underneath, all on a blue background. The two exceptions are those of, since 1981, Canada (bearing on a blue background the crest of the Royal Coat of Arms of Canada) and, since 2008, New Zealand (a St. Edward's Crown above the shield of the Coat of arms of New Zealand). The lieutenant governors of the Canadian provinces each have their own personal standards, as do the governors of the Australian states.

== History ==
=== Dominions emerge ===
The possibility that a colony within the British Empire might become a new kingdom was first mooted in the 1860s, when it was proposed that the British North American territories of Nova Scotia, New Brunswick and the Province of Canada unite as a confederation that might be known as the Kingdom of Canada.

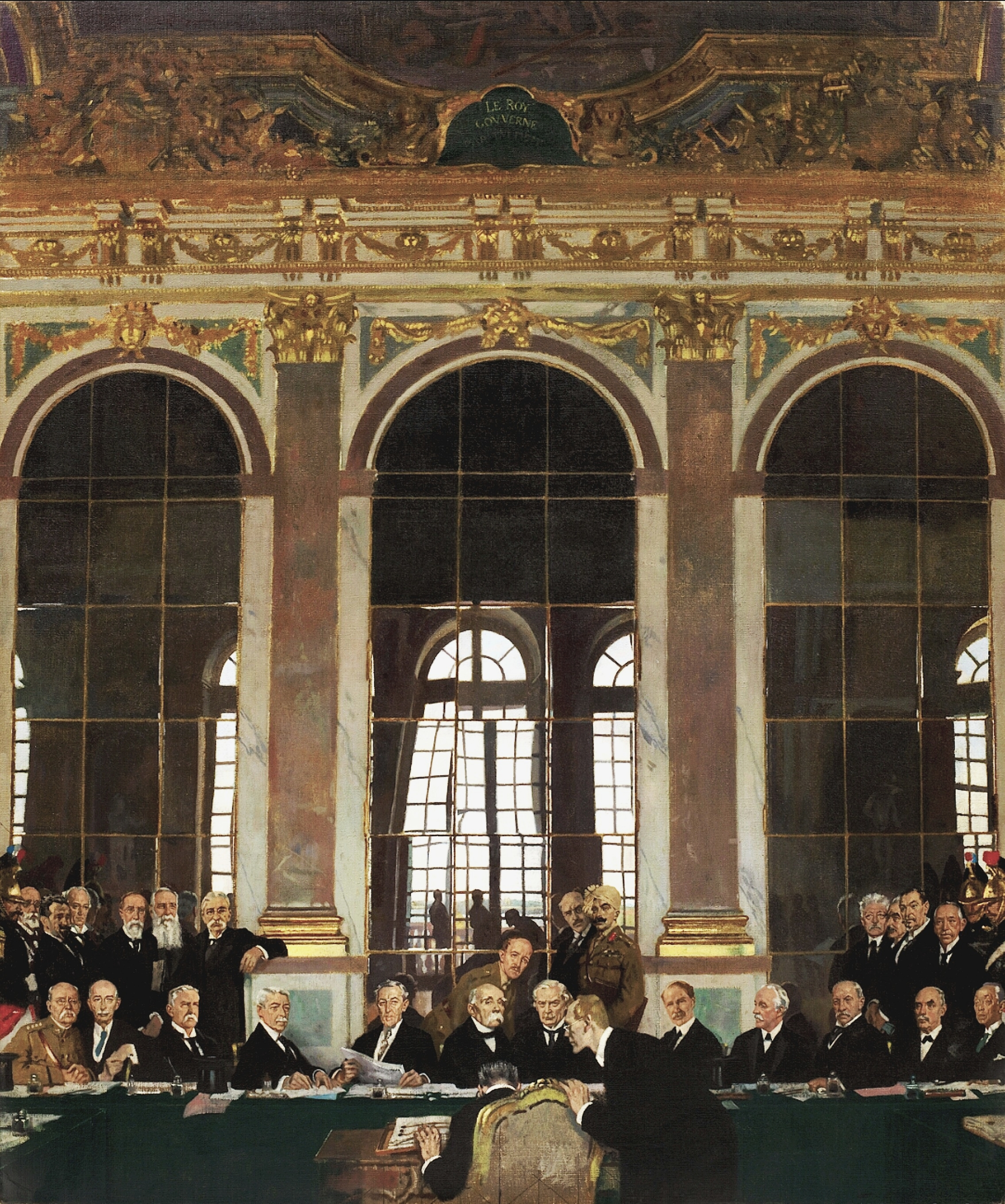
William Orpen's The Signing of Peace in the Hall of Mirrors: a compiled portrait of the main delegates to the signing of the Treaty of Versailles, including some of the dominion delegates (Note: The Australian and South African prime ministers, Billy Hughes and Louis Botha, stand first and second from the right; the Canadian delegate, Sir George Foster, stands fourth from left. The representatives of New Zealand and Newfoundland are not shown.)

Although the dominions were capable of governing themselves internally, they remained formally—and substantively in regard to foreign policy and defence—subject to British authority, wherein the governor-general of each dominion represented the British monarch-in-Council reigning over these territories as a single imperial domain. It was held in some circles that the Crown was a monolithic element throughout all the monarch's territories; A.H. Lefroy wrote in 1918 that "the Crown is to be considered as one and indivisible throughout the Empire; and cannot be severed into as many kingships as there are dominions, and self-governing colonies".

This unitary model began to erode when the dominions gained more international prominence as a result of their participation and sacrifice in the First World War. In 1919, Sir Robert Borden, the Prime Minister of Canada, and Jan Smuts, the South African Minister of Defence, demanded that, at the Versailles Conference, the dominions be given full recognition as "autonomous nations of an Imperial Commonwealth". As a result, although the King signed as High Contracting Party for the Empire as a whole, the dominions were also separate signatories to the Treaty of Versailles. They also became, together with India, founding members of the League of Nations. In 1921 the Prime Minister of the United Kingdom, David Lloyd George, stated that the "British dominions have now been accepted fully into the community of nations".

=== Balfour Declaration of 1926 ===
The pace of independence increased in the 1920s, led by Canada, which exchanged envoys with the United States in 1920 and concluded the Halibut Treaty in its own right in 1923. In the Chanak crisis of 1922, the Canadian government insisted that its course of action would be determined by the Canadian parliament, not the British government, and, by 1925, the dominions felt confident enough to refuse to be bound by Britain's adherence to the Treaty of Locarno. The Viscount Haldane said in 1919 that in Australia the Crown "acts in self-governing States on the initiative and advice of its own ministers in these States".

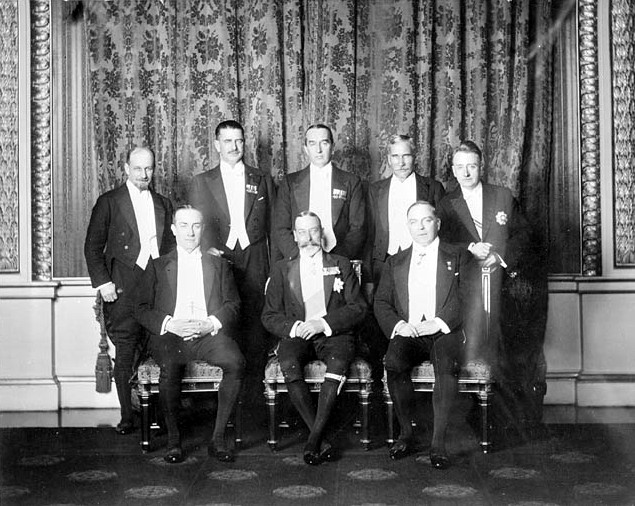
King George V at the Imperial Conference of 1926 (Note: The figures in the photo are, back row, left to right: Walter Stanley Monroe, Prime Minister of Newfoundland; Gordon Coates, Prime Minister of New Zealand; Stanley Bruce, Prime Minister of Australia; James Hertzog, Prime Minister of South Africa, and W. T. Cosgrave, President of the Executive Council of the Irish Free State; front row, left to right: Stanley Baldwin, Prime Minister of the United Kingdom; the King; and William Lyon Mackenzie King, Prime Minister of Canada.)

Another catalyst for change came in 1926, when Field Marshal the Lord Byng of Vimy, then Governor General of Canada, refused the advice of his prime minister (William Lyon Mackenzie King) in what came to be known colloquially as the King–Byng Affair. Mackenzie King, after resigning and then being reappointed as prime minister some months later, pushed at the Imperial Conference of 1926 for a reorganisation of the way the dominions related to the British government, resulting in the Balfour Declaration, which declared formally that the dominions were fully autonomous and equal in status to the United Kingdom. What this meant in practice was not at the time worked out; conflicting views existed, some in the United Kingdom not wishing to see a fracturing of the sacred unity of the Crown throughout the empire, and some in the dominions not wishing to see their jurisdiction have to take on the full brunt of diplomatic and military responsibilities.

An unofficial British Empire flag from the 1930s including the arms of the dominions

What did follow was that the dominion governments gained an equal status with the United Kingdom, a separate and direct relationship with the monarch, without the British Cabinet acting as an intermediary, and the governors-general now acted solely as a personal representative of the sovereign in right of that dominion. (Note: The ministers in attendance at the Imperial Conference agreed that: "In our opinion it is an essential consequence of the equality of status existing among the members of the British Commonwealth of Nations that the governor-general of a dominion is the representative of the Crown, holding in all essential respects the same position in relation to the administration of public affairs in the dominion as is held by His Majesty the King in Great Britain, and that he is not the representative or agent of His Majesty's Government in Great Britain or of any Department of that government".) Though no formal mechanism for tendering advice to the monarch had yet been established—former Prime Minister of Australia Billy Hughes theorised that the dominion cabinets would provide informal direction and the British Cabinet would offer formal advice—the concepts were first put into legal practice with the passage in 1927 of the Royal and Parliamentary Titles Act, which implicitly recognised the Irish Free State as separate from the UK, and the King as king of each dominion uniquely, rather than as the British king in each dominion. At the same time, terminology in foreign relations was altered to demonstrate the independent status of the dominions, such as the dropping of the term "Britannic" from the King's style outside of the United Kingdom. Then, in 1930 George V's Australian ministers employed a practice adopted by resolution at that year's Imperial Conference, directly advising the King to appoint Sir Isaac Isaacs as the Australian governor-general. Calls were also made for the empire to adopt new symbols less centred on the United Kingdom specifically, such as a new British Empire flag that would recognise the elevated status of the dominions. Many unofficial designs were often displayed for patriotic celebrations such as coronations and Empire Day.

=== Statute of Westminster 1931 ===
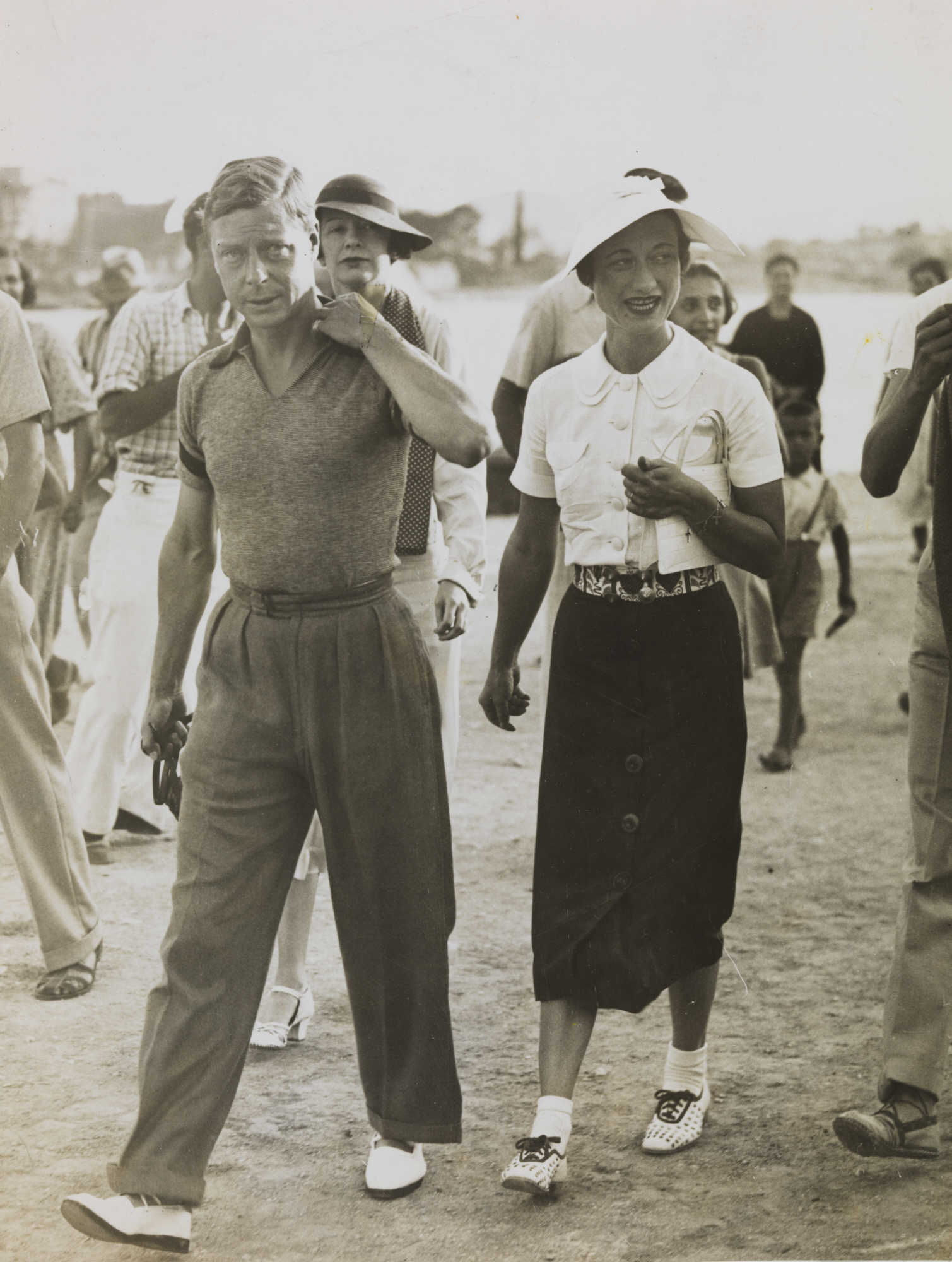
Edward VIII and Wallis Simpson in 1936. His proposal to marry her led to his abdication, an act that required the consent of the dominions.

These new developments were explicitly codified in 1931 with the passage of the Statute of Westminster, through which Canada, the Union of South Africa, and the Irish Free State all immediately obtained formal legislative independence from the UK, while in the other dominions adoption of the statute was subject to ratification by the dominion's parliament. Australia and New Zealand did so in 1942 and 1947, respectively, with the former's ratification back-dated to 1939, while Newfoundland never ratified the bill and reverted to direct British rule in 1934. As a result, the parliament at Westminster was unable to legislate for any dominion unless requested to do so, although the Judicial Committee of the Privy Council was left available as the last court of appeal for some dominions. Specific attention was given in the statute's preamble to royal succession, outlining that no changes to that line could be made by the parliament of the United Kingdom or that of any dominion without the assent of all the other parliaments of the UK and dominions, an arrangement a justice of the Ontario Superior Court in 2003 likened to "a treaty among the Commonwealth countries to share the monarchy under the existing rules and not to change the rules without the agreement of all signatories".

This was all met with only minor trepidation, either before or at the time, (Note: P.E. Corbett in 1940 questioned whether there were any existing terms that could be used to describe any or all of the "possessions of the British Crown", while Scottish constitutional lawyer Arthur Berriedale Keith warned before 1930 that "the suggestion that the King can act directly on the advice of dominion ministers is a constitutional monstrosity, which would be fatal to the security of the position of the Crown".) and the government of the Irish Free State was confident that the relationship of these independent countries under the Crown would function as a personal union, akin to that which had earlier existed between the United Kingdom and Hanover (1801 to 1837), or between England and Scotland (1603 to 1707). Its first test came, though, with the abdication of King Edward VIII in 1936, for which it was necessary to gain the consent of the governments of all the dominions and the request and consent of the Canadian government, as well as separate legislation in South Africa and the Irish Free State, before the resignation could take place across the Commonwealth. At the height of the crisis, press in South Africa fretted about the Crown being the only thing holding the empire together and the bond would be weakened if Edward VIII continued "weakening kingship". Afterward, Francis Floud, Britain's high commissioner to Canada, opined that the whole affair had strengthened the connections between the various nations; though, he felt the Crown could not suffer another shock. As the various legislative steps taken by the dominions resulted in Edward abdicating on different dates in different countries, this demonstrated the division of the Crown post-Statute of Westminster.

The civil division of the Court of Appeal of England and Wales later found in 1982 that the British parliament could have legislated for a dominion simply by including in any new law a clause claiming the dominion cabinet had requested and approved of the act, whether that was true or not. Further, the British parliament was not obliged to fulfil a dominion's request for legislative change. Regardless, in 1935 the British parliament refused to consider the result of the 1933 Western Australian secession referendum without the approval of the Australian federal government or parliament. In 1937, the Appeal Division of the Supreme Court of South Africa ruled unanimously that a repeal of the Statute of Westminster in the United Kingdom would have no effect in South Africa, stating: "We cannot take this argument seriously. Freedom once conferred cannot be revoked." Others in Canada upheld the same position.

=== Dominions gain sovereignty ===
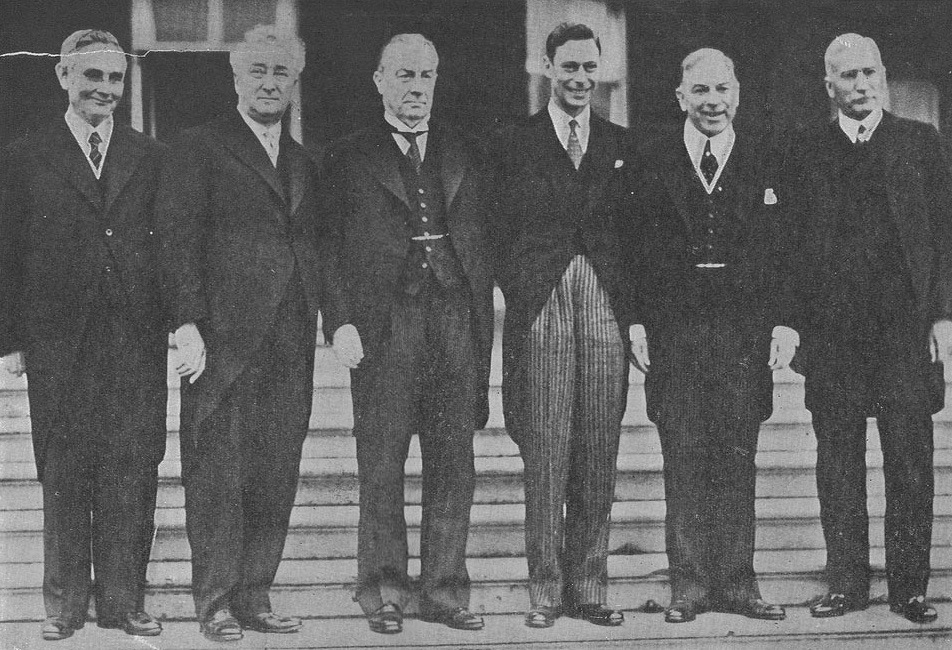
King George VI (third from right) with his prime ministers (left to right), Michael Savage, Joseph Lyons, Stanley Baldwin, William L.M. King, and James B.M. Hertzog, during the Imperial Conference, April 1937

At the 1932 British Empire Economic Conference, delegates from the United Kingdom, led by Stanley Baldwin (then Lord President of the Council), hoped to establish a system of free trade within the British Commonwealth, to promote unity within the British Empire and to assure Britain's position as a world power. The idea was controversial, as it pitted proponents of imperial trade with those who sought a general policy of trade liberalisation with all nations. The dominions, particularly Canada, were also adamantly against dispensing with their import tariffs, which "dispelled any romantic notions of a 'United Empire'." The meeting did produce a five-year trade agreement based upon a policy, first conceived in the 1900s, of Imperial Preference: the countries retained their import tariffs, but lowered these for other Commonwealth countries.

During his tenure as Governor General of Canada, Lord Tweedsmuir urged the organisation of a royal tour of the country by King George VI, so that he might not only appear in person before his people, but also personally perform constitutional duties and pay a state visit to the United States as king of Canada. While the idea was embraced in Canada as a way to "translate the Statute of Westminster into the actualities of a tour", throughout the planning of the trip that took place in 1939, the British authorities resisted at numerous points the idea that the King be attended by his Canadian ministers instead of his British ones. The Canadian prime minister (still Mackenzie King) was ultimately the minister in attendance, and the King did in public throughout the trip ultimately act solely in his capacity as the Canadian monarch. The status of the Crown was bolstered by Canada's reception of George VI.

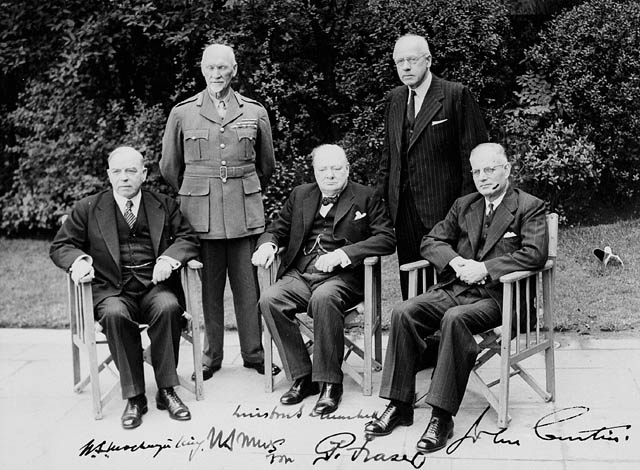
The prime ministers of five Commonwealth countries at the 1944 Commonwealth Prime Ministers' Conference; from left to right: William Lyon Mackenzie King (Canada), Jan Smuts (South Africa), Winston Churchill (United Kingdom), Peter Fraser (New Zealand) and John Curtin (Australia)

When the Second World War began, there was some uncertainty in the dominions about the ramifications of Britain's declaration of war against Nazi Germany. Australia and New Zealand had not yet adopted the Statute of Westminster; the Australian prime minister, Robert Menzies, considered the government bound by the British declaration of war, while New Zealand coordinated a declaration of war to be made simultaneously with Britain's. As late as 1937, some scholars were still of the mind that, when it came to declarations of war, if the King signed, he did so as king of the empire as a whole; at that time, William Paul McClure Kennedy wrote: "in the final test of sovereignty—that of war—Canada is not a sovereign state... and it remains as true in 1937 as it was in 1914 that when the Crown is at war, Canada is legally at war," and, one year later, Arthur Berriedale Keith argued that "issues of war or neutrality still are decided on the final authority of the British Cabinet." In 1939, Canada and South Africa made separate proclamations of war against Germany a few days after the UK's. Their example was followed more consistently by the other realms as further war was declared against Italy, Romania, Hungary, Finland and Japan. Ireland remained neutral, "shattering the illusion of imperial unity." At the war's end, it was said by F.R. Scott that "it is firmly established as a basic constitutional principle that, so far as relates to Canada, the King is regulated by Canadian law and must act only on the advice and responsibility of Canadian ministers."

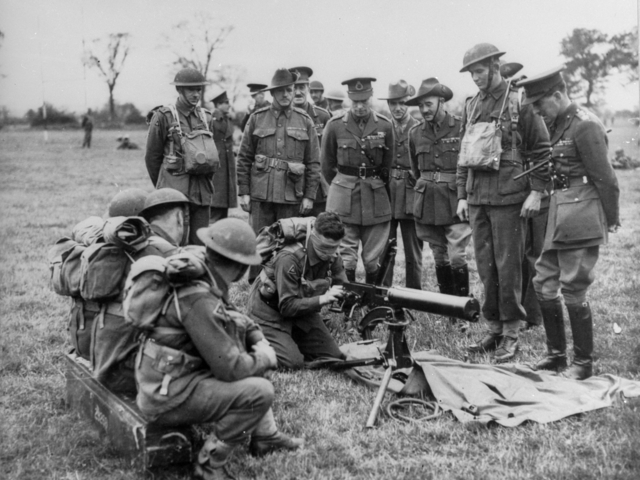
King George VI (standing centre) observes an Australian soldier assembling a machine gun while blindfolded, July 1940.

The war had strained the alliance among the Commonwealth countries, which had been noted by the King. The Prime Minister of Australia, John Curtin, had stated in December 1941 "that Australia looks to America, free of any pangs about our traditional links of kinship with Britain." The Parliament of South Africa voted on 14 January 1942 on a motion proposing the country become a republic and leave the Commonwealth. British Prime Minister Winston Churchill was told "His Majesty is genuinely alarmed at the feeling, which appears to be growing in Australia and may well be aggravated by further reverses in the Far East. He very much hopes, therefore, that it may be possible to adopt as soon as possible some procedure which will succeed in arresting these dangerous developments without impairing the efficiency of the existing machinery."

=== Post-war evolution ===
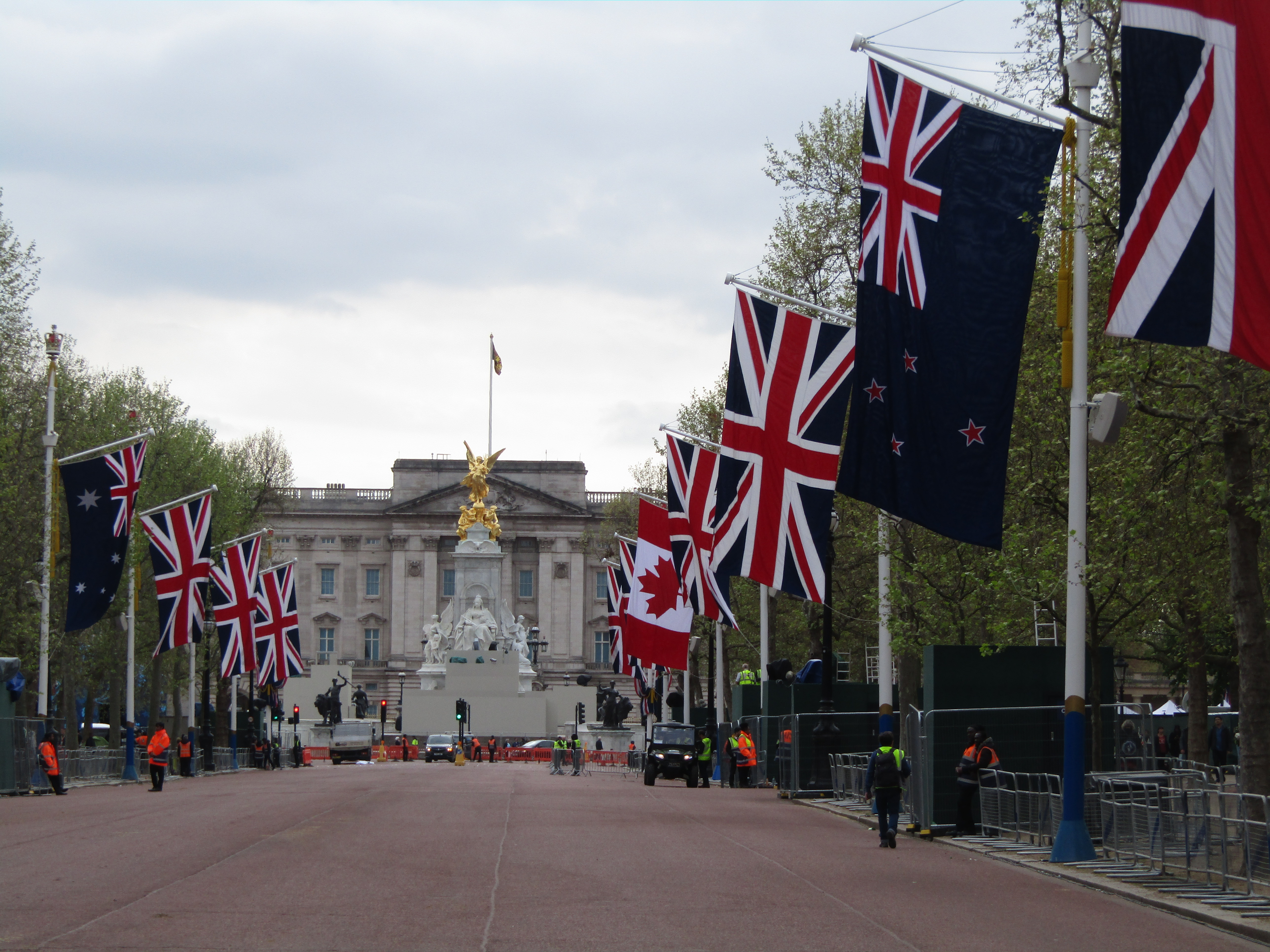
The flags of some of the Commonwealth realms (Canada, Australia, New Zealand and the UK) line the Mall shortly before Coronation Day, 2023

Within three years following the end of the Second World War, India, Pakistan and Ceylon became independent dominions within the Commonwealth. India would soon move to a republican form of government. Unlike in Ireland and Burma, there was no desire on the part of India to leave the Commonwealth, prompting a Commonwealth Conference and the London Declaration in April 1949, which entrenched the idea that republics be allowed in the Commonwealth so long as they recognised King George VI as Head of the Commonwealth and the "symbol of the free association of its independent member nations". Pakistan became a republic in 1956.

As these constitutional developments were taking place, the dominion and British governments became increasingly concerned with how to represent the more commonly accepted notion that there was no distinction between the sovereign's role in the United Kingdom and their position in any of the dominions. Thus, at the 1948 Prime Ministers' Conference the term dominion was avoided in favour of Commonwealth country, to avoid the subordination implied by the older designation.

=== Second Elizabethan era ===
Commonwealth realms at the beginning of Queen Elizabeth II's reign United Kingdom Colonies, protectorates and mandates Dominions/realms

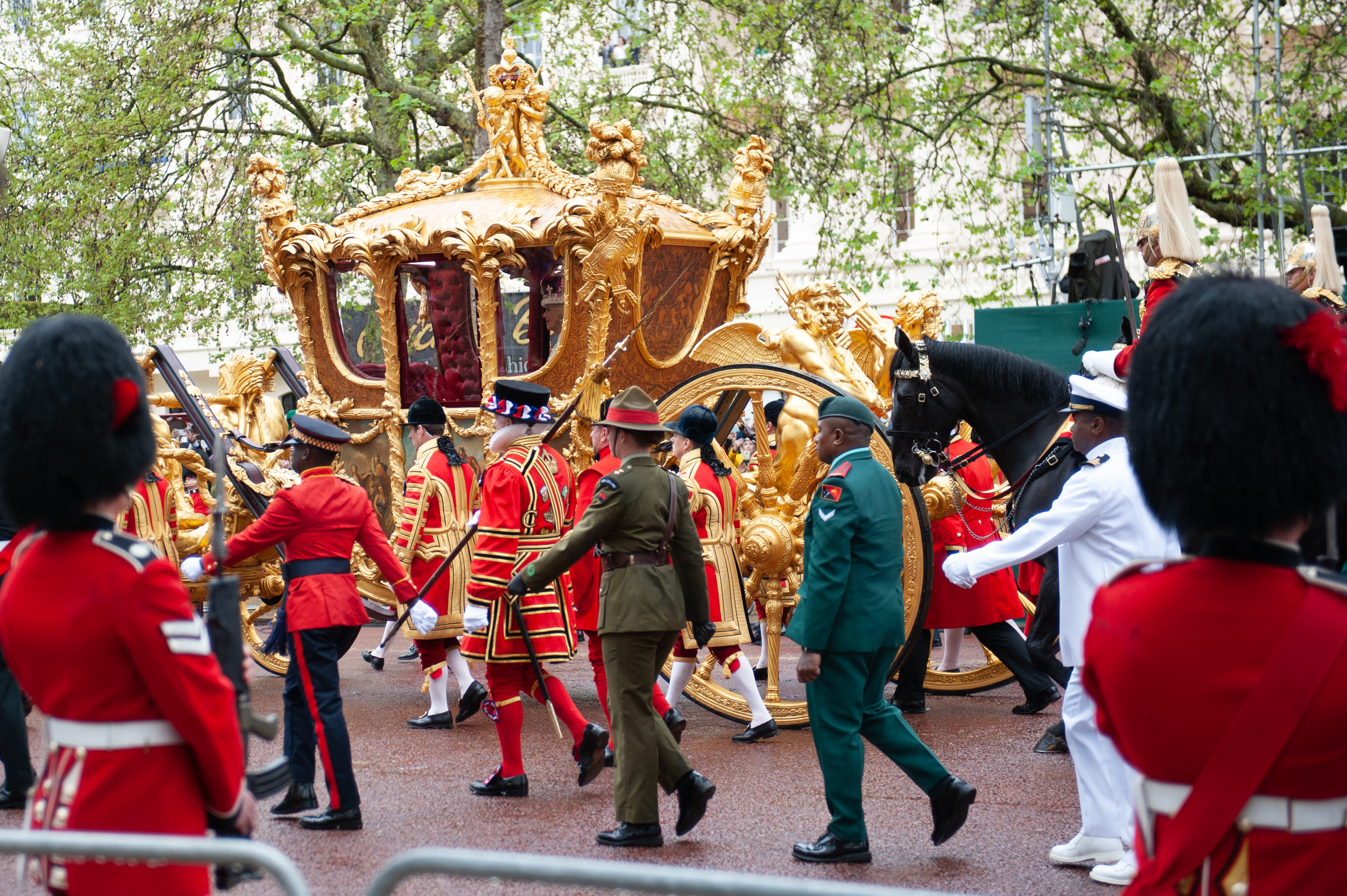
The Gold State Coach flanked by representatives of the armed forces of the realms during the Coronation Procession of King Charles III, 2023

The Commonwealth's prime ministers discussed the matter of the new monarch's title, with St. Laurent stating at the 1953 Commonwealth Prime Ministers' Conference that it was important to agree on a format that would "emphasise the fact that the Queen is Queen of Canada, regardless of her sovereignty over other Commonwealth countries." The result was a new Royal Style and Titles Act being passed in each of the seven realms then existing (excluding Pakistan), which all identically gave formal recognition to the separateness and equality of the countries involved, and replaced the phrase "British Dominions Beyond the Seas" with "Her Other Realms and Territories", the latter using the word realm in place of dominion. Further, at her coronation, Elizabeth II's oath contained a provision requiring her to promise to govern according to the rules and customs of the realms, naming each one separately.

The change in perspective was summed up by Patrick Gordon Walker's statement in the British House of Commons: "We in this country have to abandon... any sense of property in the Crown. The Queen, now, clearly, explicitly and according to title, belongs equally to all her realms and to the Commonwealth as a whole." In the same period, Walker also suggested to the British parliament that the Queen should annually spend an equal amount of time in each of her realms. Lord Altrincham, who in 1957 criticised Queen Elizabeth II for having a court that encompassed mostly Britain and not the Commonwealth as a whole, was in favour of the idea, but it did not attract wide support. Another thought raised was that viceregal appointments should become trans-Commonwealth; the governor-general of Australia would be someone from South Africa, the governor-general of Ceylon would come from New Zealand, and so on. The prime ministers of Canada and Australia, John Diefenbaker and Robert Menzies, respectively, were sympathetic to the concept, but, again, it was never put into practice.

On 6 July 2010, Elizabeth II addressed the United Nations in New York City as queen of the 16 Commonwealth realms. The following year, Portia Simpson-Miller, the Prime Minister of Jamaica, spoke of a desire to make that country a republic, while Alex Salmond, the First Minister of Scotland and leader of the Scottish National Party (which favours Scottish independence), stated an independent Scotland "would still share a monarchy with ... the UK, just as ... 16 other [sic] Commonwealth countries do now." Dennis Canavan, leader of Yes Scotland, disagreed and said a separate, post-independence referendum should be held on the matter.

Following the Perth Agreement of 2011, the Commonwealth realms, in accordance with convention, together engaged in a process of amending the common line of succession according to each country's constitution, to ensure the order would continue to be identical in every realm. In legislative debates in the United Kingdom, the term Commonwealth realm was employed, but, it remained unused in any law.

== Transitions ==
| Country (Note: The flags shown are the national flags of each country at the time it ceased to be a Commonwealth realm.) | From | To | Initial post-transition system | Method of transition |
|---|---|---|---|---|
| Barbados (monarchy) | 30 November 1966 | 30 November 2021 | Parliamentary republic | Constitutional amendment |
| Ceylon (monarchy) (Note: Renamed Sri Lanka upon becoming a republic.) | 4 February 1948 | 22 May 1972 | Parliamentary republic | New constitution |
| Fiji (monarchy) | 10 October 1970 | 6 October 1987 | Parliamentary republic | Military coup |
| The Gambia (monarchy) | 18 February 1965 | 24 April 1970 | Parliamentary republic with an executive presidency | Referendum and new constitution |
| Ghana (monarchy) | 6 March 1957 | 1 July 1960 | Assembly-independent republic | Referendum and new constitution |
| Guyana (monarchy) | 26 May 1966 | 23 February 1970 | Parliamentary republic | Resolution |
| India (monarchy) | 15 August 1947 | 26 January 1950 | Parliamentary republic | New constitution |
| Irish Free State (monarchy) | 6 December 1922 | 18 April 1949 (Note: See also: Irish head of state from 1922 to 1949.) | Parliamentary republic | Act of parliament |
| Kenya (monarchy) | 12 December 1963 | 12 December 1964 | Parliamentary republic with an executive presidency | Constitutional amendment |
| Malawi (monarchy) | 6 July 1964 | 6 July 1966 | One-party presidential republic | New constitution |
| Malta (monarchy) | 21 September 1964 | 13 December 1974 | Parliamentary republic | Constitutional amendment |
| Mauritius (monarchy) | 12 March 1968 | 12 March 1992 | Parliamentary republic | Constitutional amendment |
| Newfoundland (monarchy) | 26 September 1907 | 16 February 1934 | Commission of Government | Petition of the General Assembly of Newfoundland and Labrador followed by an Act of the British Parliament (Note: Became a province of Canada in 1949.) |
| Nigeria (monarchy) | 1 October 1960 | 1 October 1963 | Parliamentary republic | Constitutional amendment |
| Pakistan (Note: Also included modern-day Bangladesh (as East Bengal / East Pakistan).) (monarchy) | 14 August 1947 | 23 March 1956 | Parliamentary republic | New constitution |
| Rhodesia (monarchy) (Note: Rhodesia unilaterally declared independence in 1965, but this was not recognised internationally, nor did Elizabeth accept the title "Queen of Rhodesia". It declared itself a republic in 1970.) | 11 November 1965 | 2 March 1970 | Parliamentary republic | Referendum and new constitution |
| Sierra Leone (monarchy) | 27 April 1961 | 19 April 1971 | Parliamentary republic | New constitution |
| South Africa (monarchy) | 31 May 1910 | 31 May 1961 | Parliamentary republic | Referendum and new constitution |
| Tanganyika (Note: Now a part of Tanzania.) (monarchy) | 9 December 1961 | 9 December 1962 | Assembly-independent republic | New constitution |
| Trinidad and Tobago (monarchy) | 31 August 1962 | 1 August 1976 | Parliamentary republic | New constitution |
| Uganda (monarchy) | 9 October 1962 | 9 October 1963 | Parliamentary elective monarchy | Constitutional amendment |

=== Republican referendums ===
Six Commonwealth realms and dominions held referendums to consider whether they should become republics. As of January 2020, of the eight held, three were successful: in Ghana, in South Africa and the second referendum in Gambia. Referendums that rejected the proposal were held in Australia, in Tuvalu, and in Saint Vincent and the Grenadines. Interest in holding a second referendum was expressed in Australia in 2010.

During the 2020 Jamaican general election, the People's National Party promised to hold a referendum on becoming a republic within 18 months if it won the election and polls suggested that 55 per cent of Jamaicans desired the country become a republic. The ruling Jamaica Labour Party, which had in 2016 promised a referendum it did not deliver, was re-elected.

Barbados, which had been a Commonwealth realm for 55 years since it gained independence in 1966, became a republic by vote of Parliament in October 2021, effective on 30 November 2021. Some Barbadians criticised the government's decision not to hold a referendum on the issue as being undemocratic.

In 2022, following the death of Elizabeth II and the accession of Charles III, the governments of Jamaica, The Bahamas, and Antigua and Barbuda announced their intentions to hold referendums.

| Year held | Country | Yes | No | Margin of victory (%) | Republic |
|---|---|---|---|---|---|
| 1960 | Ghana | 1,008,740 (88.49%) | 131,145 (11.51%) | 877,595 (77%) | Yes |
| 1960 | South Africa | 850,458 (52.29%) | 775,878 (47.71%) | 74,580 (5%) | Yes |
| 1965 | The Gambia | 61,563 (65.85%) | 31,921 (34.15%) | —N/a (Note: In this referendum the "yes" votes failed to reach the required two-thirds (66%) total, therefore the proposal was rejected.) | No |
| 1969 | Rhodesia | 61,130 (81.01%) | 14,327 (18.99%) | 46,803 (62%) | Yes |
| 1970 | The Gambia | 84,968 (70.45%) | 35,638 (29.55%) | 49,330 (41%) | Yes |
| 1999 | Australia | 5,273,024 (45.13%) | 6,410,787 (54.87%) | 1,137,763 (10%) | No |
| 2008 | Tuvalu | 679 (35.02%) | 1,260 (64.98%) | 581 (30%) | No |
| 2009 | Saint Vincent and the Grenadines | 22,646 (43.71%) | 29,167 (55.29%) | 6,521 (12%) | No |

== See also ==
- British possession – Lands with British monarch not in the UK
- British Overseas Territories – Territories under British sovereignty
- List of sovereign states headed by Elizabeth II
- Imperial Federation – Proposed unification of the British Empire
- Union of the Crowns – Personal union of the kingdoms of Scotland, England, and Ireland from 1603
- CANZUK – Proposed alliance and heightened integration of four Commonwealth realms
