= List of titles and honours of the British monarch =

List of titles and honours of the British monarch may refer to:

- List of titles and honours of Charles III
- List of historic titles of British monarchs
- Style of the British monarch
