= Queen of the Gambia =

Elizabeth II's reign in The Gambia from 1965 to 1970

Queen of The Gambia
- Coat of arms of the Gambia

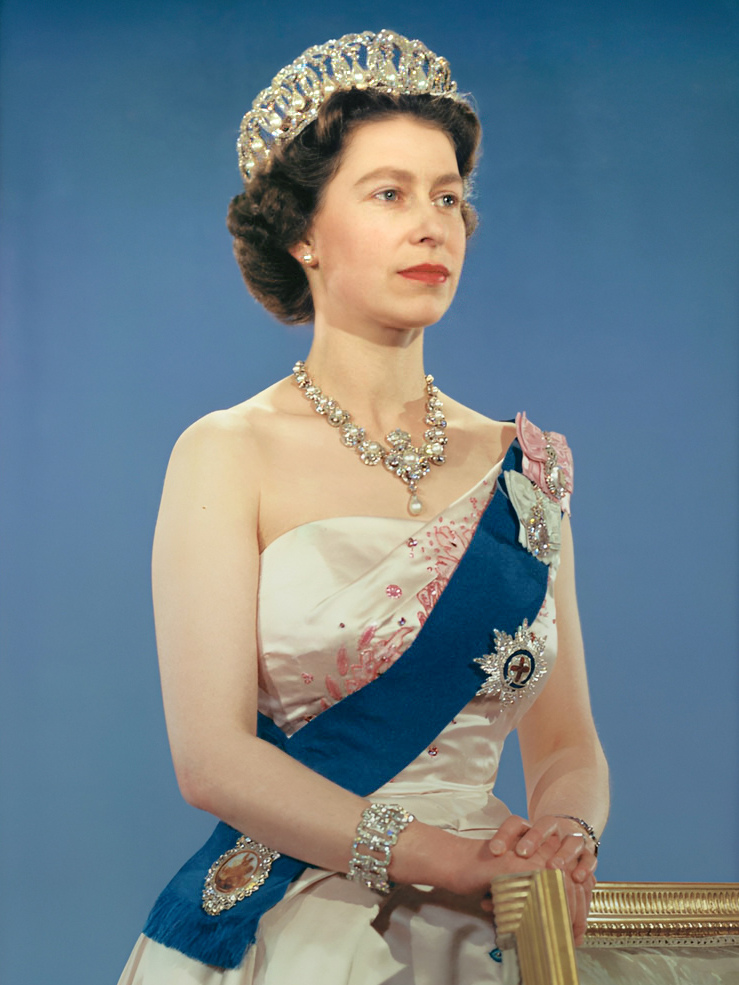
- Elizabeth II

Details
- Style: Her Majesty
- Formed: 18 February 1965
- Abolished: 24 April 1970

Elizabeth II was Queen of The Gambia from 1965 to 1970, when the Gambia was an independent sovereign state and a constitutional monarchy within the Commonwealth of Nations. She was also the monarch of the other Commonwealth realms, including the United Kingdom. Her constitutional roles in the Gambia were delegated to the governor-general.

== History ==
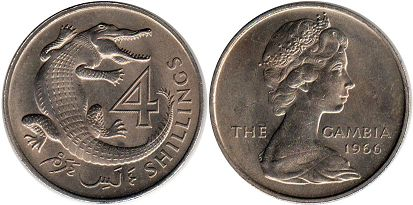
A 1966 Gambian four-shilling coin depicting Queen Elizabeth II as Queen of The Gambia

The Gambia was granted independence in 1965 under the Gambia Independence Act 1964 of the Parliament of the United Kingdom, which transformed the Gambia Colony and Protectorate into an independent sovereign state, with Queen Elizabeth II as the head of state and Queen of the Gambia. The Duke of Kent, accompanied by the Duchess of Kent, represented the Queen of the Gambia at the independence celebrations. The Duke opened the first session of the Gambian Parliament, on behalf of the Queen, and gave the speech from the throne on 18 February.

External videos
- The Gambia: First Parliament Opened N Bathurst by Duke of Kent. (1965); Source: British Pathé.

The Queen's constitutional roles were mostly delegated to the Governor-General of the Gambia, her viceregal representative in the Gambia, who was appointed by the Queen on the advice of the Prime Minister of the Gambia. The Governor-General acted on the advice of the Gambian ministers. Two governors-general held office: Sir John Paul (1965–1966), and Sir Farimang Mamadi Singateh (1966–1970).

The monarchial form of government was protected under an "entrenched" provision of the Gambian constitution. Entrenched clauses could only be amended if supported by two-thirds of the elected members of the Gambian parliament, and thereafter confirmed by a two-thirds majority in a referendum. After two referendums on the Gambian monarchy, the first unsuccessful because it did not pass by the necessary two-thirds majority and the second successful, the Gambia adopted a new constitution that abolished the monarchy on 24 April 1970. The Gambia became a republic within the Commonwealth, with the president of the Gambia as head of state and head of government.

== Visits ==
The Queen said in her Christmas broadcast in 1958, that she and her husband would be visiting the Gambia in late 1959. But later the visit was postponed, as she had become pregnant in 1959.

Queen Elizabeth visited the Gambia on 3–5 December 1961. During the visit, the people of the village of Berending in the Gambia gave the Queen a two-year-old crocodile in a pierced silver biscuit-box as a present for infant Prince Andrew. The Queen's Private Secretary Sir Martin Charteris volunteered to keep it in his bath for the rest of the trip.

== Styles ==
Elizabeth II had the following styles in her role as the Queen of The Gambia:

- 18 February 1965 – 18 June 1965: Elizabeth the Second, by the Grace of God, of the United Kingdom of Great Britain and Northern Ireland and of Her other Realms and Territories Queen, Head of the Commonwealth, Defender of the Faith
- 18 June 1965 – 24 April 1970: Elizabeth the Second, Queen of the Gambia and all Her other Realms and Territories, Head of the Commonwealth

== Gallery ==
Queen Elizabeth II on Gambian stamps

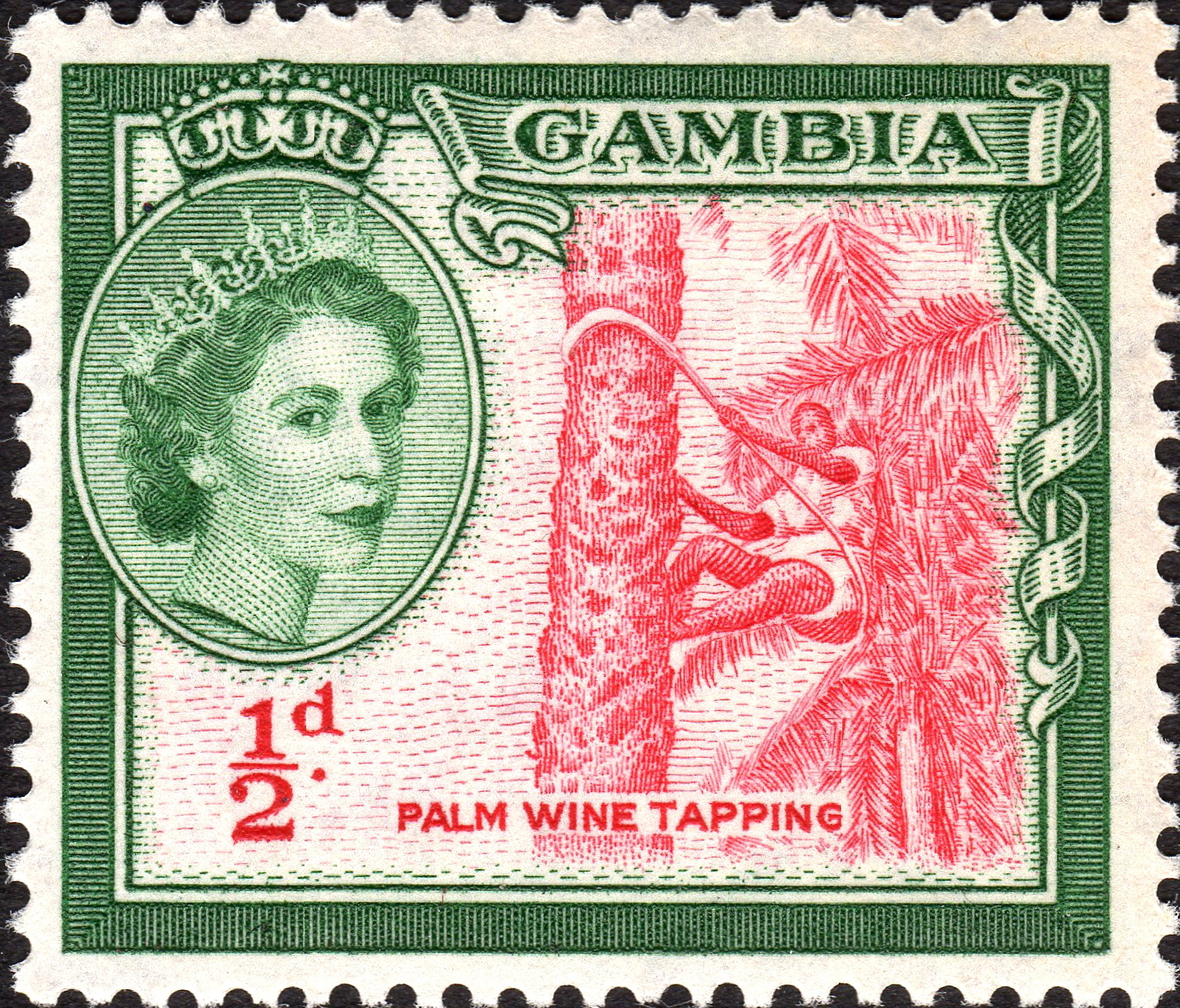
Depicting palm wine tapping

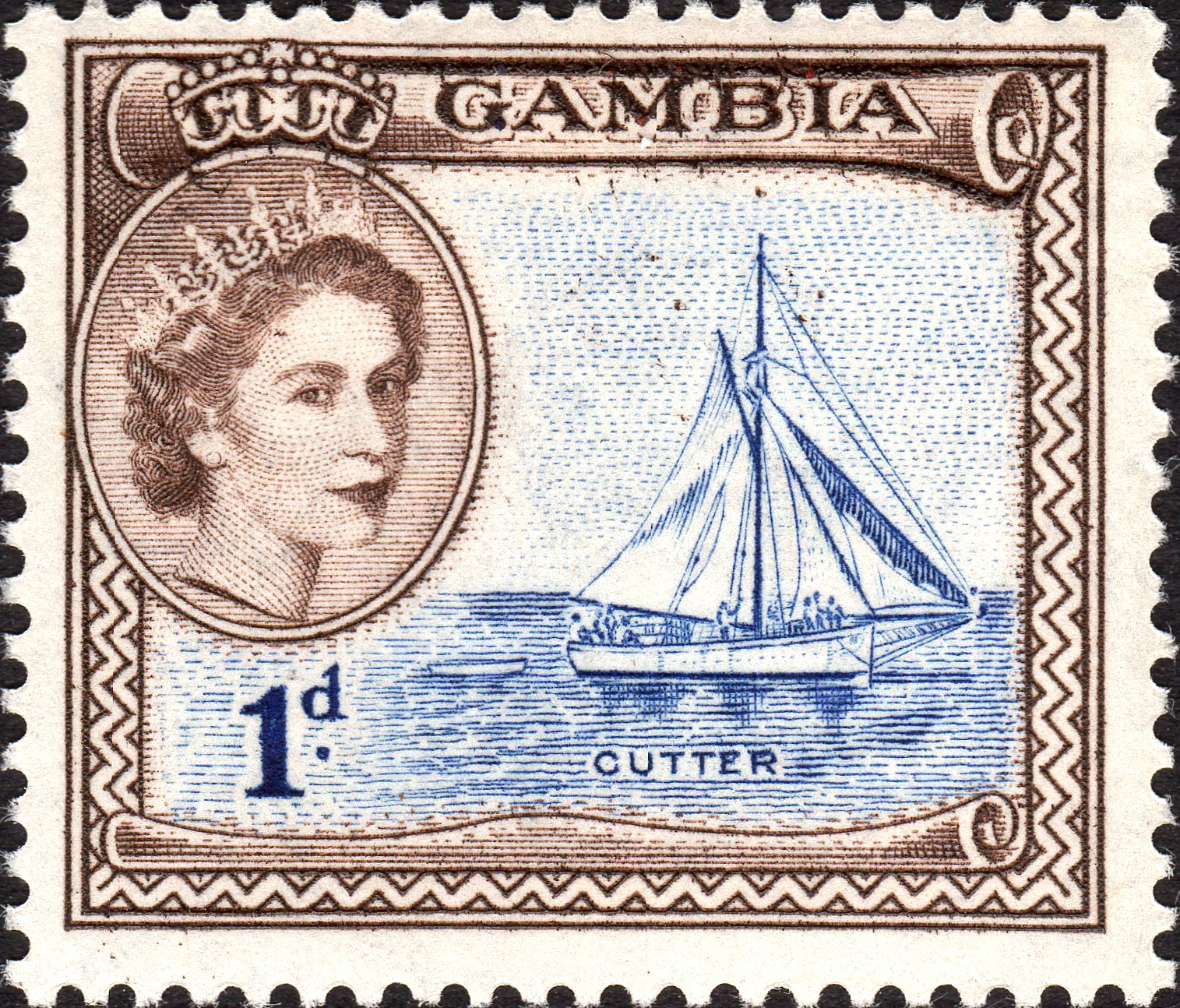
Depicting a cutter

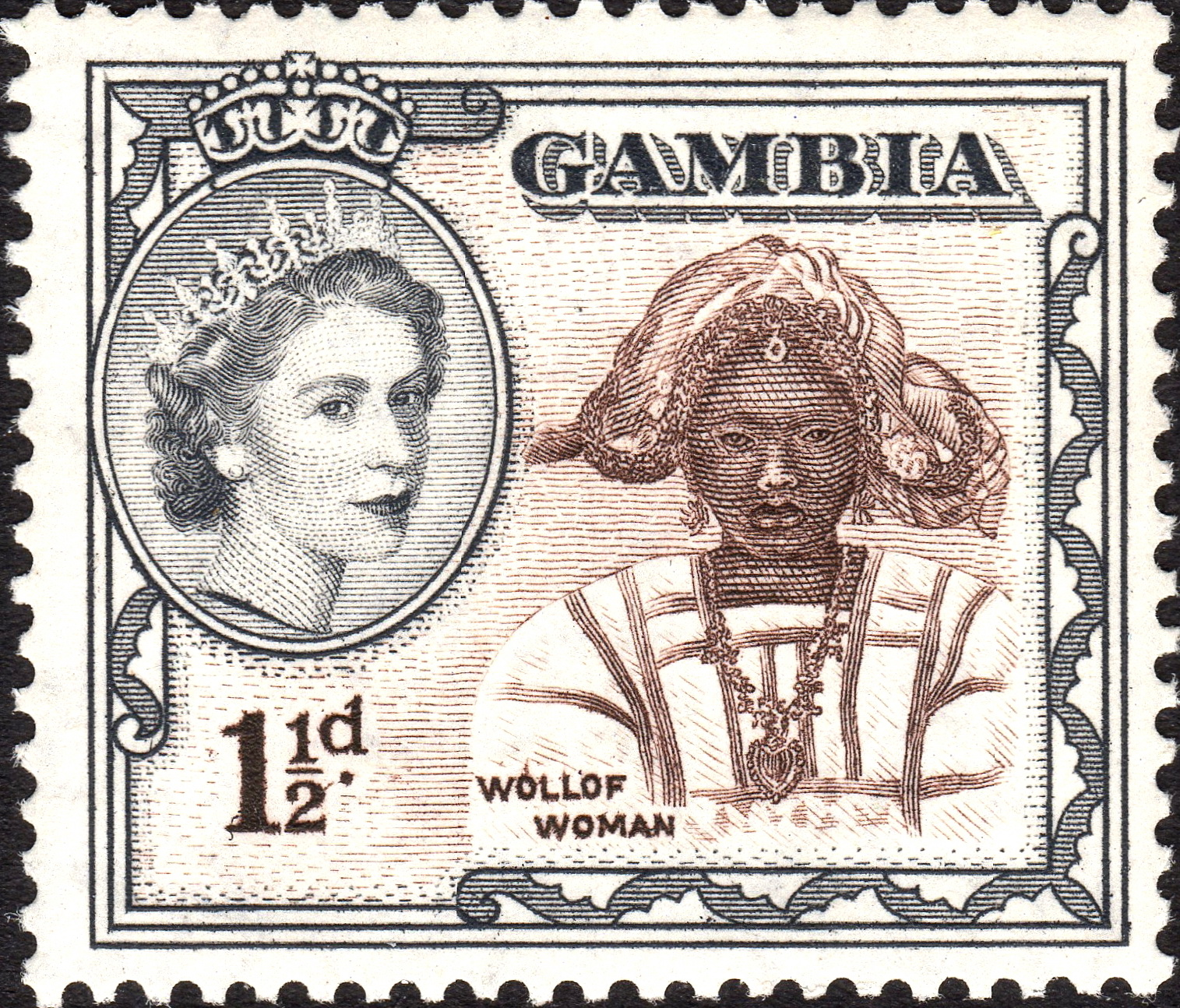
Depicting a Wollof woman

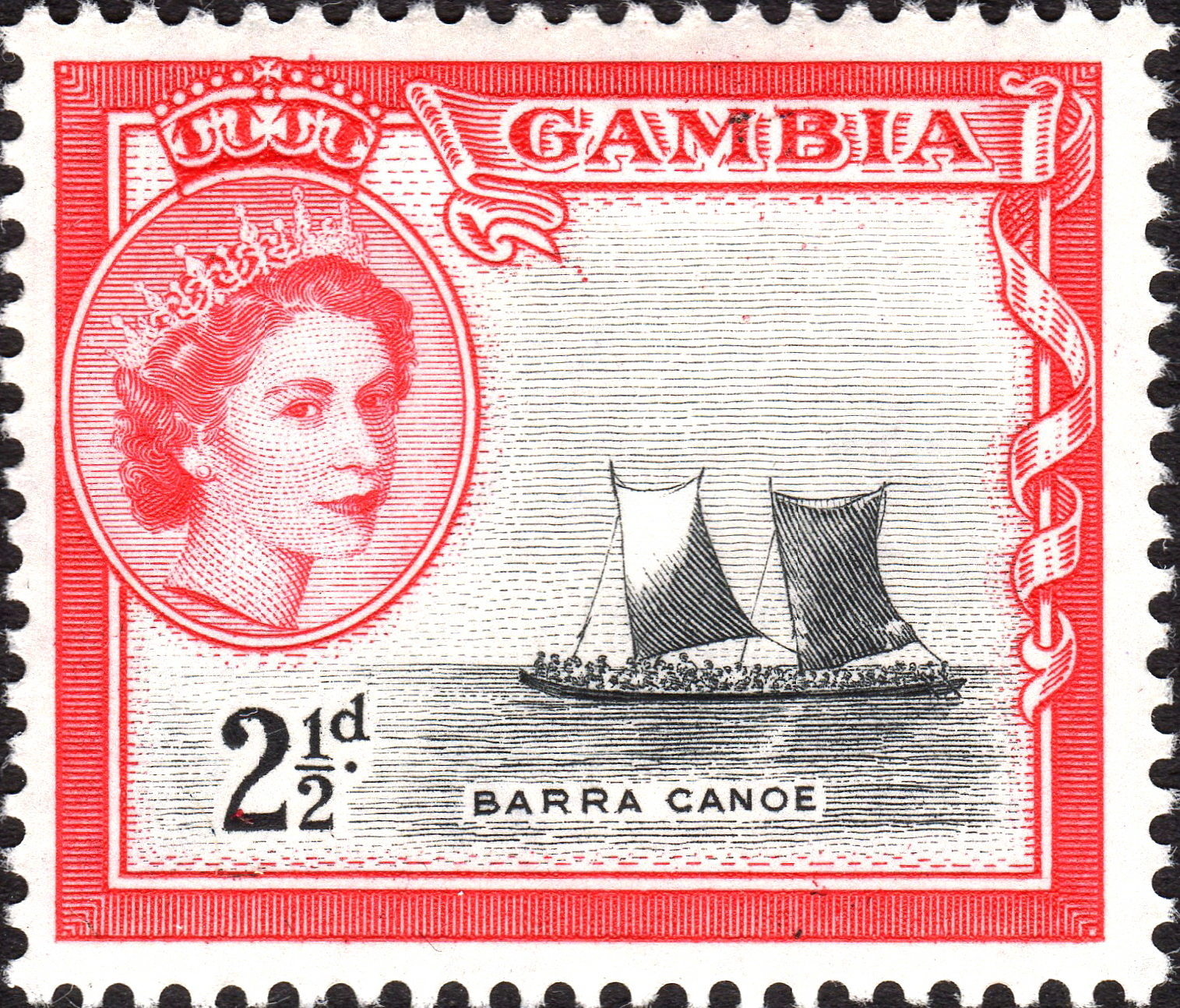
Depicting Barra canoe

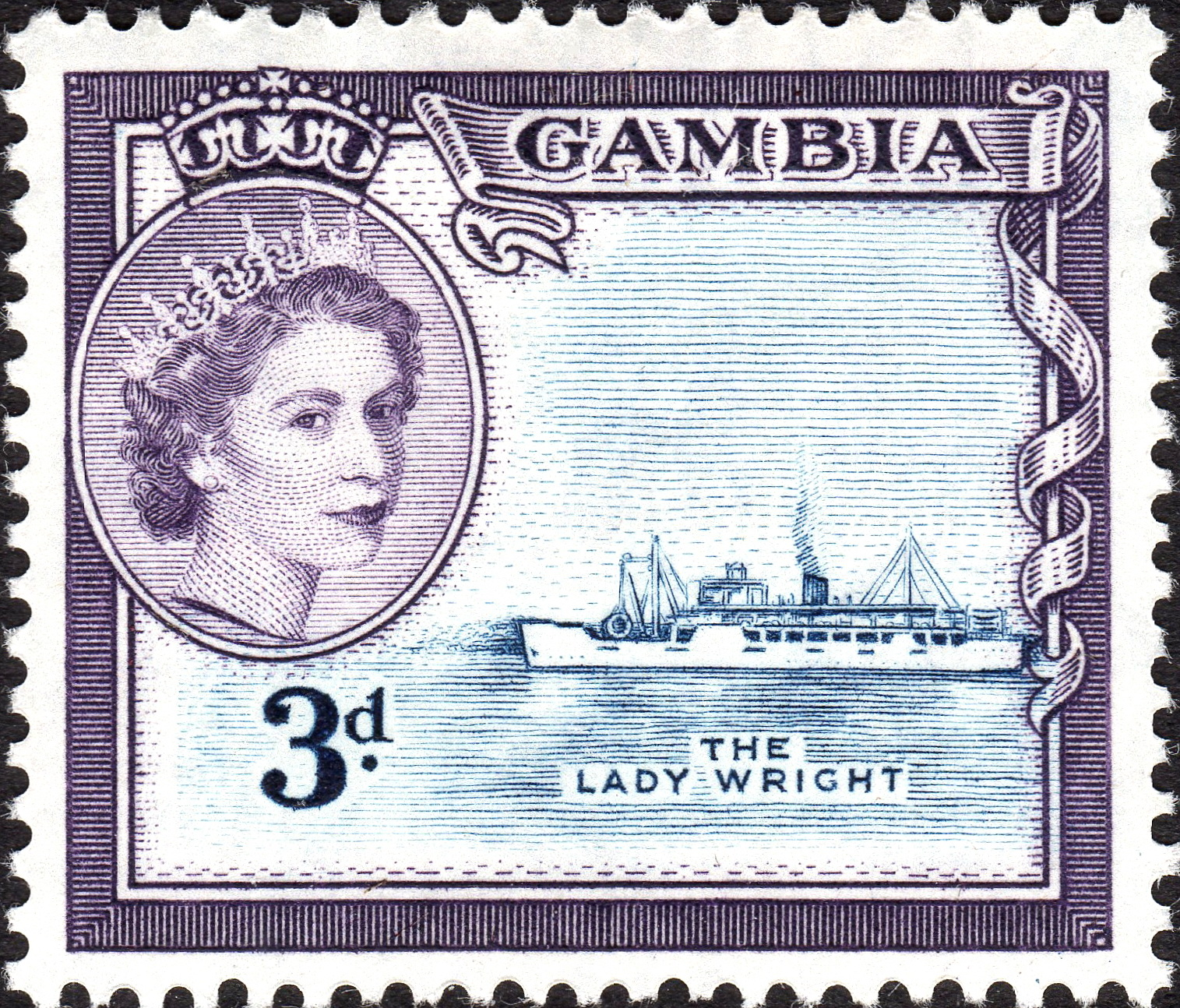
Depicting The Lady Wright (ship)

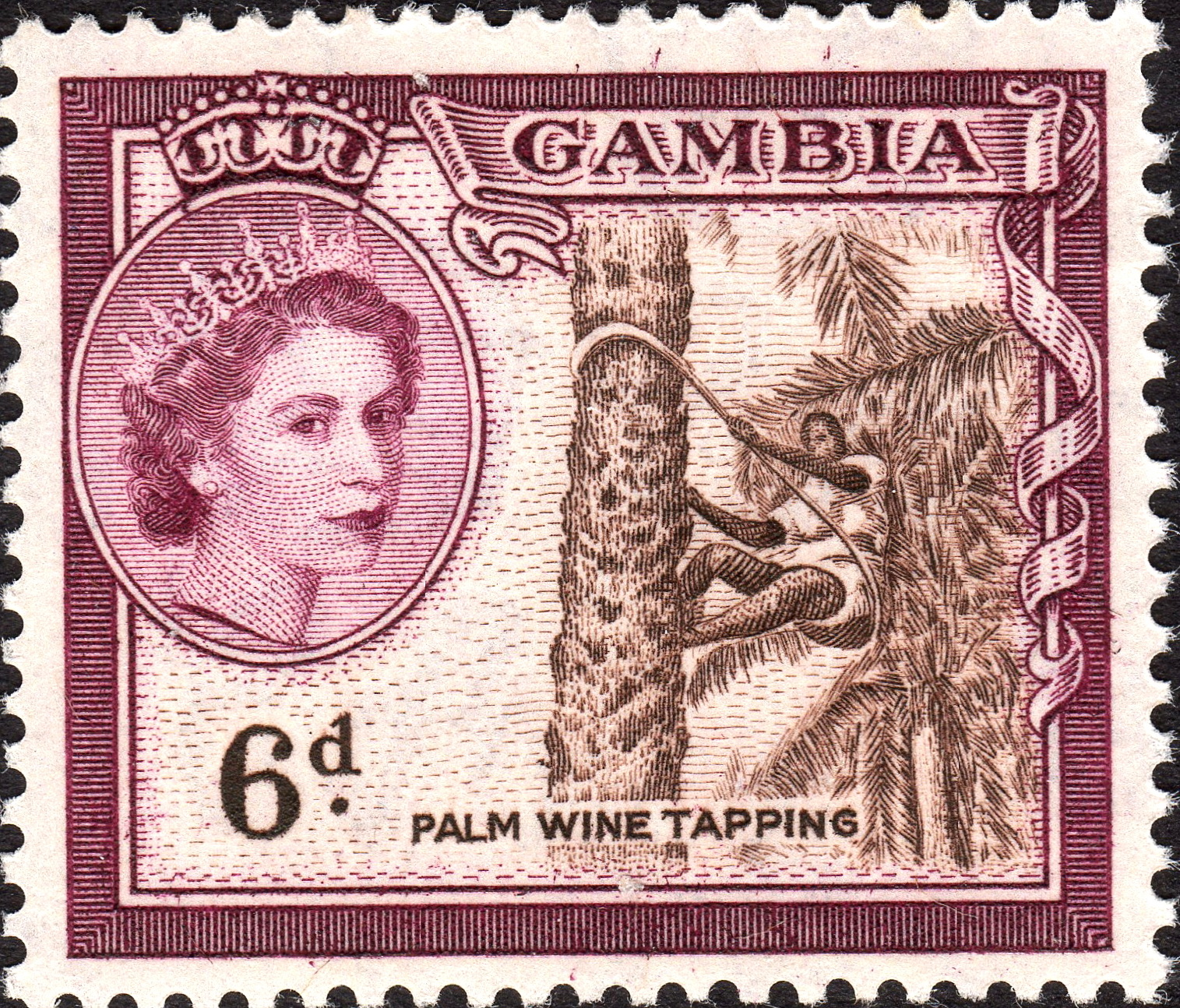
Depicting palm wine tapping
