= Queen of Malawi =

Elizabeth II's reign in Malawi from 1964 to 1966

- Coat of arms of Malawi

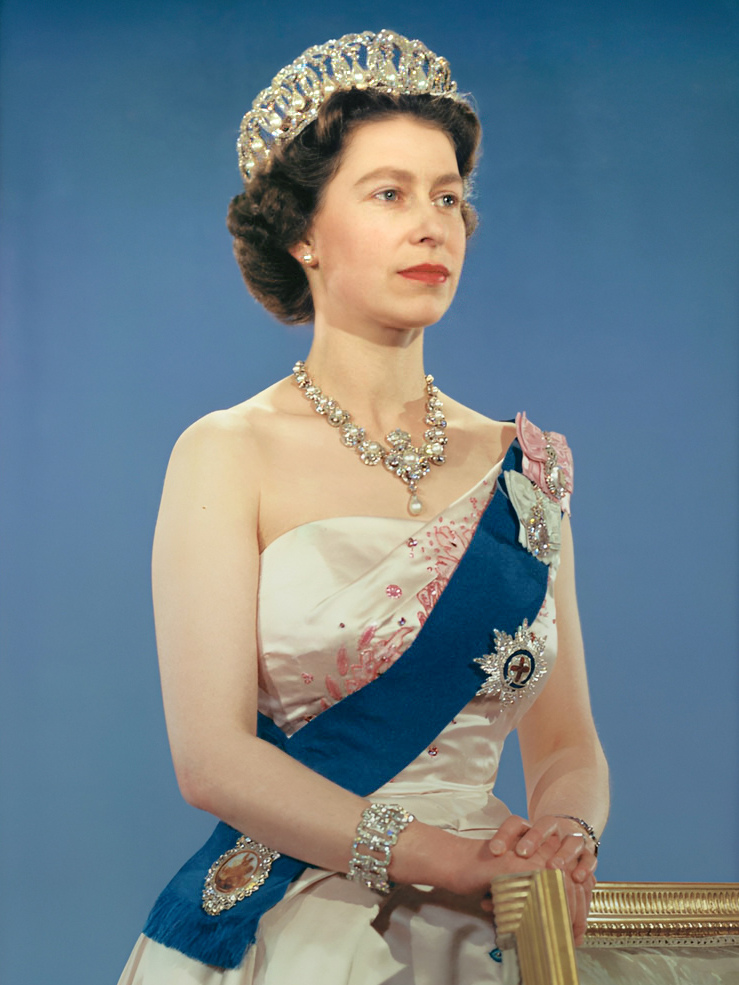
- Elizabeth II

Details
- Style: Her Majesty
- Formed: 6 July 1964
- Abolished: 6 July 1966

Elizabeth II was Queen of Malawi from 1964 to 1966, when Malawi was an independent sovereign state and a constitutional monarchy within the Commonwealth of Nations. She was also the sovereign of the other Commonwealth realms, including the United Kingdom. The 1964 Constitution of Malawi vested executive power in the monarch as head of state, though her constitutional roles were delegated to her representative, the Governor-General, Sir Glyn Smallwood Jones, who was also the last Governor of Nyasaland.

== History ==
Malawi was granted independence by the Parliament of the United Kingdom's Malawi Independence Act 1964, which transformed the Protectorate of Nyasaland into an independent sovereign state called Malawi. Prince Philip, Duke of Edinburgh represented the Queen at the independence celebrations in July 1964. On 7 July, the Duke read the Speech from the Throne at parliament, on behalf of the Queen, in which it was stressed that Malawi would not seek "to impose its ideology on others, nor will it accept the imposition of other ideologies upon itself".

The roles of the monarch and the governor-general in Malawi were abolished on 6 July 1966, when Malawi became a republic within the Commonwealth, with the president of Malawi as executive head of state and head of government. Hastings Banda, the former Prime Minister of Malawi declared himself the first President of the republic.

Queen Elizabeth II visited Malawi from 22 to 25 July 1979. The Queen Elizabeth Central Hospital in Blantyre was opened in 1958 and is the largest hospital in Malawi.

== Styles ==
Queen Elizabeth II had the following styles in her role as the monarch of Malawi:

- 6 July 1964 – 1964: Elizabeth the Second, by the Grace of God, of the United Kingdom of Great Britain and Northern Ireland and of Her other Realms and Territories Queen, Head of the Commonwealth, Defender of the Faith
- 1964 – 6 July 1966: Elizabeth the Second, by the Grace of God Queen of Malawi and of Her other Realms and Territories, Head of the Commonwealth

== Gallery ==
Queen Elizabeth II on stamps of Rhodesia and Nyasaland, before she became Queen of Malawi

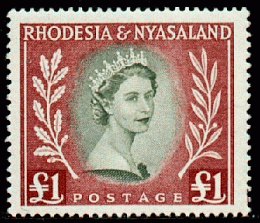

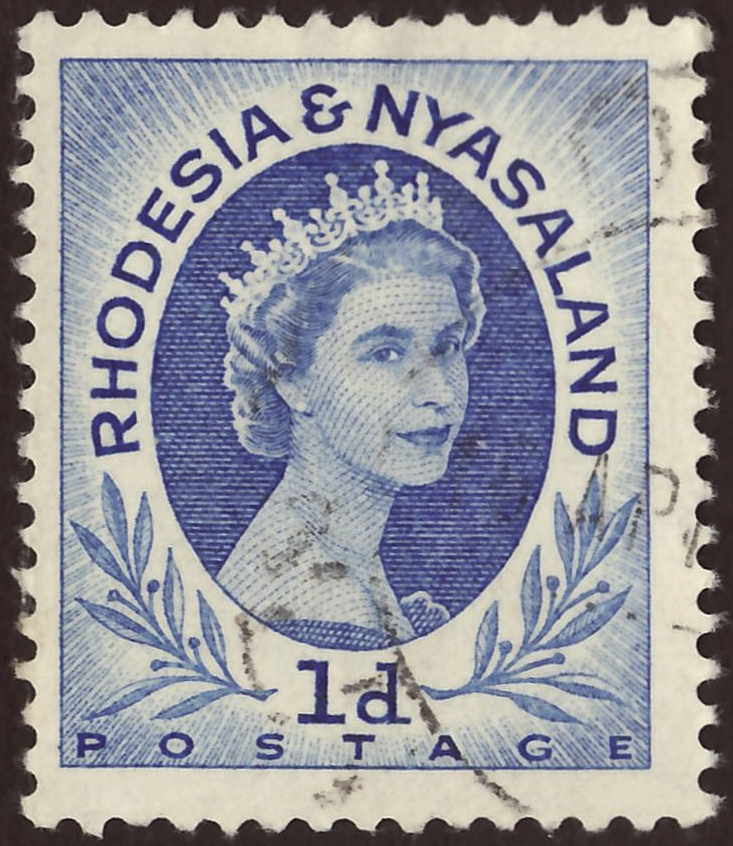

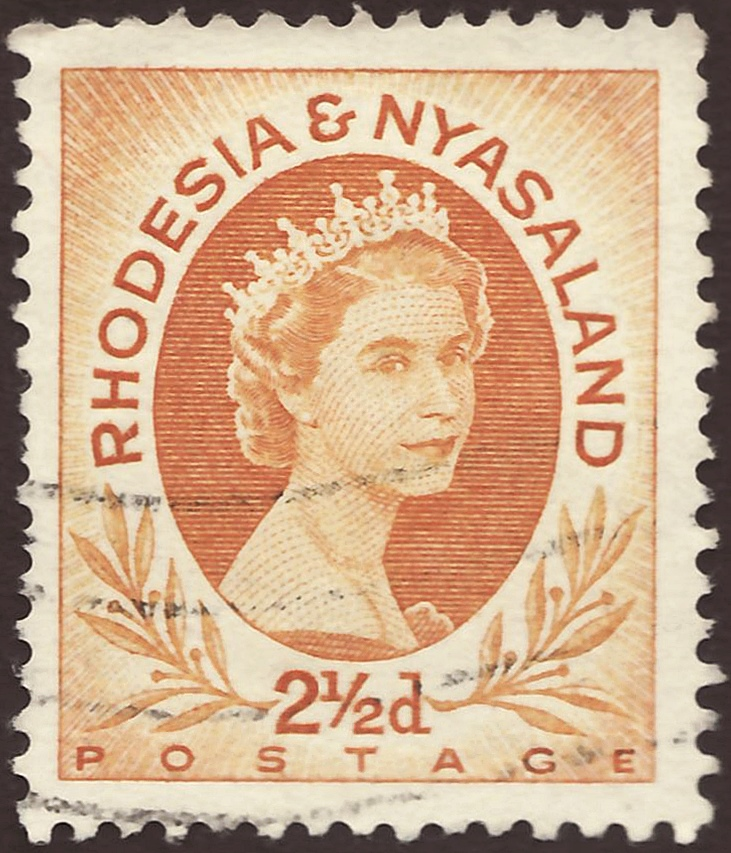

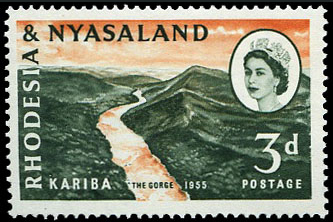
