= 1965 Gambian republic referendum =

24 November 1965

Results
Choice	Votes	%
Yes	61,563	65.85%
No	31,921	34.15%
Valid votes	93,484	100.00%
Invalid or blank votes	0	0.00%
Total votes	93,484	100.00%
Registered voters/turnout	154,626	60.46%

A referendum on becoming a republic was held in the Gambia on 24 November 1965. If the referendum had passed, the post of president would have replaced Elizabeth II as head of state, and thus eliminated the post of Governor-General.

There were 154,626 registered voters for the referendum, with 93,484 valid votes cast. 65.85% of voters voted for the proposal, but failed to reach the two-thirds support required for the proposal to be accepted.

A second referendum was held in 1970, which resulted in a successful "yes" vote. Prime Minister Dawda Jawara was elected president by the parliament, replacing Elizabeth II (represented by Farimang Mamadi Singateh) as head of state on 24 April 1970.

== Result ==
Choice	Votes	%
For	61,563	65.85
Against	31,921	34.15
Total	93,484	100
Registered voters/turnout	154,626	60.46
Source: African Elections database
