= 1970 Gambian republic referendum =

April 1970

Results
Choice	Votes	%
Yes	84,968	70.45%
No	35,638	29.55%
Valid votes	120,606	100.00%
Invalid or blank votes	0	0.00%
Total votes	120,606	100.00%
Registered voters/turnout	133,813	90.13%

A referendum on becoming a republic was held in the Gambia in April 1970. The changes resulted in the creation of the post of President to replace Elizabeth II as head of state, thus eliminating the post of Governor-General. It was the second referendum on the issue: the first in 1965 failed because the two-thirds majority required was not reached.

This time the referendum produced a "yes" result. The Prime Minister Sir Dawda Jawara was elected the first President by the parliament, replacing Elizabeth II (represented by Governor-General Sir Farimang Mamadi Singateh) as head of state on 24 April 1970.

== Result ==
Choice	Votes	%
For	84,968	70.45
Against	35,638	29.55
Total	120,606	100
Registered voters/turnout	133,813	90.1
Source: Hughes & Perfect
