= List of monarchs who lost their thrones in the 21st century =

The following monarchs either lost their thrones through deposition by a coup d'état, by a referendum which abolished their throne, or chose to abdicate during the 21st century. A list of surviving former monarchs appears at the end of the article.

See also: Abolished monarchy, List of current monarchs, List of non-sovereign monarchs who lost their thrones

== B ==
=== Barbados ===
- Queen Elizabeth II ceased to be Queen of Barbados in 2021 when the country became a republic.

=== Belgium ===
- King Albert II abdicated in 2013 in favour of his son Philippe.

=== Bhutan ===
- King Jigme Singye Wangchuck abdicated in 2006 in favour of his son Jigme Khesar Namgyel Wangchuck.

== C ==
=== Cambodia ===
- King Norodom Sihanouk abdicated in 2004 in favour of his son, Norodom Sihamoni. It was his second abdication.

== D ==
=== Denmark ===
- Queen Margrethe II abdicated in 2024 in favour of her son Frederik X.

== J ==
=== Japan ===
- Emperor Akihito abdicated in 2019 in favour of his son Naruhito.

== K ==
=== Kuwait ===
- Emir Saad Al-Abdullah Al-Salim Al-Sabah, was voted out of office and abdicated at the same time on 24 January 2006.

== L ==
=== Luxembourg ===
- Grand Duke Henri abdicated in 2025 in favour of his son Guillaume V.

== M ==
=== Malaysia ===
- Ismail Petra of Kelantan, Sultan of Kelantan, deemed incapacitated by illness abdicated on 13 September 2010. He was succeeded by his son, Muhammad V of Kelantan.
- Muhammad V of Kelantan, Yang di-Pertuan Agong XV, abdicated on 6 January 2019 without reason given. He remains the Sultan of Kelantan.
- Ahmad Shah of Pahang, Sultan of Pahang, abdicated on 14 January 2019, succeeded by his son Abdullah of Pahang due to his illness which rendered him incapable of carrying out his duties as ruler. His abdication is decided by the Royal Council meeting.

== N ==
=== Nepal ===
- King Gyanendra was deposed when the Nepalese Constituent Assembly abolished the Nepalese monarchy effective 28 May 2008.

=== Netherlands ===
- Queen Beatrix abdicated in 2013 in favour of her son Willem-Alexander.

== Q ==
=== Qatar ===
- Emir Hamad bin Khalifa voluntarily abdicated 2013 in favour of his son Tamim bin Hamad.

== S ==
=== Spain ===
- King Juan Carlos I abdicated in 2014 in favour of his son Felipe VI.

== V ==
=== Vatican City ===
- Pope Benedict XVI, sovereign of Vatican City, abdicated in 2013. He was eventually succeeded by Francis.

== See also ==
- List of monarchs who abdicated
- List of monarchs who lost their thrones in the 20th century
- List of monarchs who lost their thrones in the 19th century
- List of monarchs who lost their thrones in the 18th century
- List of monarchs who lost their thrones in the 17th century
- List of monarchs who lost their thrones in the 16th century
- List of monarchs who lost their thrones in the 15th century
- List of monarchs who lost their thrones in the 14th century
- List of monarchs who lost their thrones in the 13th century
- List of monarchs who lost their thrones before the 13th century
