= Lists of monarchs =

List of monarchs may refer to:

- List of current sovereign monarchs
- List of current constituent monarchs
- List of monarchs by nickname
- List of fictional monarchs
- List of longest-reigning monarchs
- List of shortest-reigning monarchs
- A king list, used as an early form of periodisation

== By current countries ==
Note: The list includes both current monarchies and current countries that have abolished the monarchy.

- Afghanistan
- Albania
- Andorra
- Antigua and Barbuda
- Armenia
- Australia
- Austria (and later Austria-Hungary)
- The Bahamas
- Bahrain
- Barbados
- Belize
- Belgium
- Benin
- Bosnia
- Bhutan
- Brazil
- Brunei
- Bulgaria
- Burundi
- Cambodia
- Canada
- Central Africa
- China
- Croatia
- Cyprus
- Czechia
- Denmark
- Egypt
- Estonia
- Eswatini
- Ethiopia
- Fiji
- Finland
- France
- The Gambia
- Georgia
- Ghana
- Germany
- Grenada
- Greece
- Guyana
- Haiti
- Hungary
- Iceland
- India
- Indonesia
- Iran
- Iraq
- Ireland
- Israel
- Italy
- Jamaica
- Japan
- Jordan
- Kenya
- Korea
- Kuwait
- Laos
- Lesotho
- Libya
- Liechtenstein
- Lithuania
- Luxembourg
- Madagascar
- Malawi
- Malaysia
- Maldives
- Malta
- Mauritius
- Monaco
- Mongolia
- Mexico
- Montenegro
- Morocco
- Myanmar
- Nepal
- Netherlands
- New Zealand
- Nigeria
- Niue
- Norway
- Oman
- Pakistan
- Papua New Guinea
- Poland
- Portugal
- Qatar
- Romania
- Russia
- Rwanda
- Saint Kitts and Nevis
- Saint Lucia
- Saint Vincent and the Grenadines
- Saudi Arabia
- Serbia
- Sierra Leone
- Solomon Islands
- South Africa
- Spain
- Sri Lanka
- Syria
- Sweden
- Thailand
- Tonga
- Trinidad and Tobago
- Tunisia
- Turkey (Ottoman Empire)
- Tuvalu
- Uganda
- Ukraine
- United Arab Emirates
- United Kingdom and predecessors
- Vatican
- Vietnam
- Yemen

== Defunct countries ==
Note: These countries no longer exist and neither does the monarchy.

- Ailech
- Akkad
- Anhalt
- Anjou
- Apulia and Calabria
- Aquitaine
- Aragon
- Argos
- Athens
- Auvergne
- Axum
- Babylon
- Baden
- Bavaria
- Berg
- Bora Bora
- Brabant
- Brittany
- Bosporan Kingdom
- Brandenburg
- Brunswick
- Brunswick-Wolfenbüttel
- Burgundy (County)
- Burgundy (Duchy)
- Burgundy (Kingdom)
- Byzantine Empire
- Canaan
- Capua
- Caracol
- Castile
- Cleves
- Connacht
- Cyrene
- Dál Riata
- East Anglia
- Epirus
- Essex
- Flanders
- the Franks
- Fürstenberg
- Galicia
- Gallic Empire
- Guastalla
- Guelders
- Hainaut
- Hanau
- Hanover
- Hawaii
- Hejaz
- Henneberg
- Hesse
- Hohenlohe
- Hohenzollern
- Holland
- Huahine
- Illyria
- Inca Empire (Tawantinsuyu)
- Isenburg
- the Isles
- Jerusalem
- Jülich
- Kashmir
- Kent
- Kush
- Leinster
- Latin Empire
- Leiningen
- León
- Limburg
- Lippe
- the Lombards
- Lombardy-Venetia
- Lorraine
- Lucca
- Lüneburg
- Lydia
- Macedonia
- Mann
- Mantua
- Massa
- Mauretania
- Mecklenburg
- Meissen
- Mercia
- Mide
- Milan
- Modena
- Moldavia
- Munster
- Namur
- Naples
- Nassau
- Navarre
- Normandy
- Northumbria
- Numidia
- Oettingen
- Oldenburg
- Palatinate
- Palmyra
- Parma
- Parthia
- the Picts
- Pomerania
- Pontus
- Powys
- Provence
- Prussia
- Raiatea
- Reuss
- Roman Empire
- Rome
- Rûm
- Ryukyu
- Salm
- Sardinia
- Savoy
- Saxe-Lauenburg
- Saxony
- Schleswig-Holstein
- Schwarzburg
- Seleucid Empire
- Seljuk Empire
- Sicily
- Silesia
- Sindh
- Sparta
- Strathclyde
- Sussex
- Swabia
- Tahiti
- Tanganyika
- Tenochtitlan (Aztec Empire)
- Thessalonica
- Thuringia
- Tibet
- Tikal
- Transylvania
- Trebizond
- Tuscany
- Two Sicilies
- Waldeck
- Wallachia
- Wessex
- Württemberg
- Yugoslavia
- Zanzibar

== Monarchs who lost their thrones ==
- List of monarchs who lost their thrones before the 13th century
- List of monarchs who lost their thrones in the 13th century
- List of monarchs who lost their thrones in the 14th century
- List of monarchs who lost their thrones in the 15th century
- List of monarchs who lost their thrones in the 16th century
- List of monarchs who lost their thrones in the 17th century
- List of monarchs who lost their thrones in the 18th century
- List of monarchs who lost their thrones in the 19th century
- List of monarchs who lost their thrones in the 20th century
- List of monarchs who lost their thrones in the 21st century
- List of non-sovereign monarchs who lost their thrones
- List of monarchs who abdicated

== Fictional ==
- List of fictional monarchs
- Galactic Empire (Isaac Asimov)

== See also ==
- List of current pretenders
- List of deposed politicians
- List of usurpers
