= Rechila =

5th century Suevic king of Galicia

- King of the Suevi
- Reign: 438–448
- Predecessor: Hermeric
- Successor: Rechiar
- Born: c. 395; Germania
- Died: 448; Mérida, Spain
- Consort: a Visigothic princess
- Issue: Rechiar; Ricimer
- Father: Hermeric
- Religion: Germanic paganism

Animation showing Rechila's conquests (438–48).

Rechila (died 448) was the Suevic king of Galicia from 438 until his death. There are few primary sources for his life, but Hydatius was a contemporary Christian (non-Arian) chronicler in Galicia.

Timeline of the Suebic Kings

When his father, Hermeric, turned ill in 438, he retired from active political life (dying in 441) and handed the reins of government and the royal title over to his son. He endeavoured to expand the Suevic kingdom to fill the vacuum left by the retiring Vandals and Alans. In 438 he defeated Andevotus, the comes Hispaniarum, on the river Genil (Singillio). The Roman position in Iberia became so tenuous that three magistri utriusque militiae (masters of both services) were sent to the peninsula between 441 and 446.

Invading southern Iberia, Rechila took the provincial capitals of Mérida in 439 and Seville in 441. These conquests were extremely significant, but nothing of the sequence of events leading to them is known. The provinces of Lusitania, Baetica, and Carthaginiensis were subjected to the Suevi with the exception of the Levante and the Mediterranean seaboard.

Rechila was involved in near constant war with the Romans. While returning in 440 from his third embassy to the Suevi, the Roman legate Censorius was captured by Rechila near Mértola (Myrtilis). The king had him imprisoned for the remainder of his reign.

Rechila died a pagan in Mérida: gentilis moritur ("died a gentile") according to Hydatius, but Isidore of Seville, writing well over a century and a half later, and whose source was Hydatius, says ut ferunt, gentilitatis vitam finivit ("finished his life a gentile, so they say"). There is no reason, however, for accepting Isidore's doubts, which were probably precipitated by the fact that Rechila's son and successor was the Catholic Rechiar. Some scholars have raised the contention that his father raised him that way in order to foster good relations with the Church and bring about the easy conversion of the Suevi.

Rechila may have been the father or perhaps uncle of the magister militum Ricimer.

== Sources ==
- Gillett, Andrew. "The Birth of Ricimer." Historia: Zeitschrift für Alte Geschichte 44, 3 (1995): 380–84.
- Thompson, E. A. "The Conversion of the Spanish Suevi to Catholicism." Edward James, ed., Visigothic Spain: New Approaches. Oxford: Oxford University Press, 1980. ISBN 0-19-822543-1.
- Thompson, E. A. Romans and Barbarians: The Decline of the Western Empire. Madison: University of Wisconsin Press, 1982. ISBN 0-299-08700-X.

Preceded by Hermeric	King of Galicia; 438–448	Succeeded by Rechiar
