= Cindazunda =

Cindazunda was the daughter of Hermeric, king of the Suebi in the territory that would become Spain's Galiza and both the Norte Region and the Centro Region of Portugal. She married Attaces, king of the Alans, in the early 5th century. This Suebi princess is immortalized in history as a symbol of the city of Coimbra, in Portugal, and her image appears in the official coat of arms of Coimbra.

== Legend ==
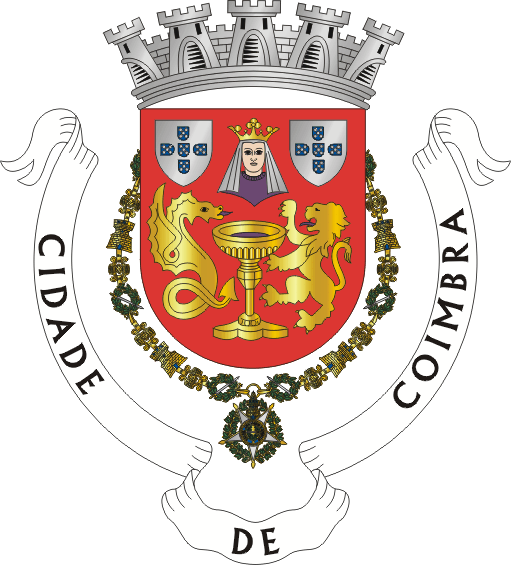
The coat of arms of Coimbra is said to be inspired on Cindazunda, Hermeric's daughter. The legendary symbolism of the lion is tied to Ataces, ruler of the Alans, and that of the winged serpent (or dragon) is tied to Hermeric, ruler of the Suebi.

In the early 5th century, Ataces, king of the Alans, after conquering Aeminium (modern Coimbra), near the already declining city of Conímbriga (the former chief settlement in the area during Roman times) also conquered by him and later completely destroyed by the Suebi between 465 and 468, decided to found or restore another one with the same name of the former on the right bank of the Mondego in place of Aeminium. When Ataces was directing the construction of this new city he called Colimbria in honor of ancient Conímbriga, the Suebi king Hermeric and his army appeared to take possession of the city and to take revenge for the defeats he had suffered. The combat between the two factions was so bloody that the waters of the Mondego were dyed red. Hermeric withdrew to the north, but Ataces went in pursuit and the Swabian king was forced to ask for peace. To this end, he offered the victor the hand of the princess Cindazunda, his daughter. As is usual in such cases, the legend says that Cindazunda was extremely beautiful and that Ataces soon fell in love with her. The royal couple came on their way to Coimbra, accompanied by their father and father-in-law, and soon the espousals and wedding took place, with all due magnificence. To commemorate such an extraordinary event, Ataces bestowed upon the city of Coimbra the coat of arms that is still the coat of arms of modern Coimbra. In that coat of arms, the crowned maiden is Cindazunda; the cup represents her marriage to Ataces; the lion is the stamp of Ataces; the dragon (or winged serpent), the stamp of Hermeric.
