= List of monarchs who lost their thrones before the 13th century =

This is a list of monarchs who lost their thrones before the 13th century.

== A ==
=== Kingdom of Abkhazia ===
- Adarnase of Abkhazia, ruled from 880 to 887/888, deposed and executed by Bagrat I.
- Bagrat I of Abkhazia, ruled from 887/88 to 898/99.
- Theodosius III of Abkhazia, forced to abdicate in 978.

=== Alamannia and Rhaetia (Swabia) ===
- Charles the Fat, King of Alamannia and Rhaetia 876–887, deposed, died 888.

=== Duchy of Amalfi ===
- Manso, Prefect of Amalfi, Prefect of Amalfi from 898 to 914, retired to a monastery.
- Sergius II of Amalfi, 1007–1028, deposed.
- Manso II of Amalfi, 1028 to 1029, from 1034 to 1038, and from 1043 to 1052.
- John II of Amalfi, 1029–1069 with many interruptions.
- John III of Amalfi, 1073, deposed.
- Marinus Sebastus of Amalfi, 1096–c. 1100. Deposed.

=== County of Anjou ===
- Geoffrey III, Count of Anjou, 1060–1068, deposed 1068 and imprisoned, but freed by the intervention of the Pope, died in 1096.
- Fulk of Jerusalem, 1106–1129, died 1143.

=== Duchy of Apulia ===
- Roger II of Sicily, 1127–1130, deposed when his duchy became a part of his new Kingdom of Sicily.

=== Duchy of Aquitaine ===
- Waiofar, deposed 760.
- Ebalus, Duke of Aquitaine, deposed 892, restored 902. Died 935.

=== County of Aragon ===
- Aznar Galíndez I, 809–820, died 839
- Andregoto Galíndez, 922–925, died after 926.

=== County of Arles ===
- Boso, Margrave of Tuscany, 895–911 and 926–931.

=== County of Armagnac ===
- Bernard II Tumapaler, 1020 to 1061, died 1064/1090.

=== Kingdom of Armenia ===
- Tigranes V of Armenia, ruled 6-12, deposed by rebels.
- Mithridates of Armenia, 35–37 and 42–51.
- Tiridates I of Armenia, 53 and 54–56.
- Rhadamistus, 51–53 and 53–54.
- Tigranes VI of Armenia, from 58 to 63, forced to abdicate.
- Erato of Armenia, reigning three times.

=== Kingdom of Asturias ===
- Bermudo I of Asturias, abdicated 791.
- Nepotian of Asturias, 842.

=== Assyria ===
- Ashur-nirari V, King of Assyria 755–745 BC, overthrown.
- Marduk-apla-iddina II, King of Assyria 722–710 BC, died 702.

=== County of Auvergne ===
- Firminus, Count of Auvergne c. 555 or 558, deposed, restored, 560–571.

=== Kingdom of Aksum ===
- Kaleb of Axum, said to have abdicated c. 520.
- 'Anbasa Wedem, in the 9th–10th century, deposed.

== B ==
=== Babylonia ===
- Marduk-zakir-shumi II, King of Babylon 703 BC, overthrown.
- Marduk-apla-iddina II, King of Babylon 722–710 BC, and 703–702 BC. Deposed and later retreated to Elam.
- Sennacherib, King of Babylon 705–703 BC and 689–681 BC.
- Bel-ibni, King of Babylon 703–700 BC, deposed 700 BC.
- Nergal-ushezib, King of Babylon 694–693 BC, deposed and defeated by Assyria in 693 BC.
- Nabonidus, King of Babylon, deposed in 539BC due to the conquest of Babylon by the Persians.

=== Bavaria ===
- Grifo, Duke of Bavaria 748, deposed 748, died c. 753.
- Tassilo III, Duke of Bavaria, Duke of Bavaria 748 to 787, deposed 787, died c. 796.
- Louis the German, King of Bavaria 817–843, lost Bavaria after the Treaty of Verdun, died 876.
- Engeldeo, Margrave of Bavaria 890–895, deposed 895.
- Eberhard, Duke of Bavaria, Duke of Bavaria 937 – 938, deposed 938.
- Henry II, Duke of Bavaria, Duke of Bavaria 955–976 and 985–995.
- Henry III, Duke of Bavaria, 983–985, deposed 985, died 989.
- Henry II, Holy Roman Emperor, Duke of Bavaria 995–1005.
- Henry III, Holy Roman Emperor, Duke of Bavaria 1026–1041.
- Conrad I, Duke of Bavaria, Duke of Bavaria 1049–1053, deposed 1053, died 1055.
- Welf I, Duke of Bavaria, Duke of Bavaria 1070–1077 and 1096–1101.
- Otto of Nordheim, Duke of Bavaria 1061–1070, deposed 1070, died 1083.
- Henry IV, Holy Roman Emperor, Duke of Bavaria 1053–1054, 1055–1061, 1077–1096.
- Henry IX, Duke of Bavaria, Duke of Bavaria 1120–1126, abdicated 1126 and died shortly thereafter.
- Henry II, Duke of Austria, Duke of Bavaria 1141–1156, displaced 1156, died 1177.
- Henry the Lion, Duke of Bavaria 1156–1180, deposed 1180, died 1195.

=== County of Barcelona ===
- Humfrid, deposed, 865, died after 872.
- Bernard of Gothia, deposed, 878.
- Sunyer, Count of Barcelona, abdicated 947, died 950.
- Berenguer Ramon II, Count of Barcelona, abdicated 1097.

=== Béarn ===
- Mary, Viscount of Béarn, 1170–1171, died after 1187.

=== Duchy of Benevento ===
- Grimoald I of Benevento, Duke 651–662, died 671.
- Audelais of Benevento, Duke 732–733, deposed.
- Liutprand of Benevento, Duke 749–758, deposed, died after 759.
- Radelchis II of Benevento, Prince 881–884 and 897–900, died 907.
- Landulf IV of Benevento, Prince 981, died 892.

=== Duchy of Bohemia ===
- Boleslaus III (999–1002)
- Boleslaus III (1003), second time
  - Jaromir (1003)
- Boleslaus (IV) (1003–1004) (Piast; he was duke Boleslaus I of Poland)
- Jaromir (1004–1012), second time
- Oldřich (1012–1033)
- Jaromir (1033–1034), third time
- Oldrich (1034), second time
- Bořivoj II (1101–1107)
- Vladislaus I (1109–1117)
- Borivoj II (1117–1120), second time
- Vladislaus I (1120–1125), second time
- Vladislaus II (1140–1172, king from 1158)
- Frederick (1172–1173)
- Soběslav II (1173–1178)
- Frederick (1178–1189), second time
- Wenceslaus II (1191–1192)
- Ottokar I (1192–1193)
- Vladislaus III Henry (1197)
- Ottokar I (1197–1198)

=== Duchy of Bouillon ===
- Godfrey I the Captive 959–964, died 995.
- Godfrey V, 1076–1095, died 1100.

=== Bulgarian Empire ===
- Sevar, 738-753, deposed
- Kormisosh, 753-756, deposed and murdered
- Vinekh, 756-762, deposed and murdered
- Telets, 762-765, deposed and murdered
- Sabin, 765–766, deposed, fled to Constantinopole.
- Umor, 766, deposed, fled to Constantinople.
- Toktu, 766-767, deposed and murdered near the Danube.
- Pagan, 767-768, deposed and murdered near Varna.
- Telerig, 768–777, forced to flee into exile.
- Boris I, 852–889, abdicated 889 died 907.
- Vladimir-Rasate, 889–893, deposed, blinded and imprisoned by his father.
- Peter I of Bulgaria, 927-969, abdicated 969, died January 970.
- Boris II, 969-971, abdicated 971
- Roman, 976-991 (997), captured by the Byzantines in 991, died in captivity in 997.

=== White Croats ===
- Sobjeslav, ruler of the White Croats c. 990s, died 1004.

=== Byzantine Empire ===
- Heraklonas, deposed 641.
- Justinian II, deposed 695, restored 705.
- Leontios, deposed 698.
- Tiberios III, deposed 705.
- Philippikos Bardanes, deposed 713.
- Anastasios II, deposed 715.
- Theodosios III, deposed 717.
- Constantine VI, deposed 797.
- Irene, deposed 802.
- Staurakios, deposed 811.
- Michael I Rangabe, deposed 813.
- Romanos I Lekapenos, deposed 944.
- Michael V Kalaphates, deposed 1042.
- Michael VI Bringas, deposed 1057.
- Isaac I Komnenos, abdicated 1059.
- Romanos IV Diogenes, deposed 1071.
- Michael VII Doukas, deposed 1078.
- Nikephoros III Botaneiates, deposed 1081.
- Andronikos I Komnenos, deposed 1185.
- Isaac II Angelos, deposed 1195, restored 1203, deposed again 1204.
- Alexios III Angelos, deposed 1204.
- Alexios IV Angelos, deposed 1204.
- Alexios V Doukas, deposed 1204.
- John IV Laskaris, deposed 1258.
- Andronikos II Palaiologos, deposed 1328.

== C ==
=== Umayyad Caliphate ===
- Ibrahim ibn al-Walid, 744, abdicated.

=== Abbasid Caliphate ===
- Al-Qahir, 932–934, died 950.
- Al-Muttaqi, 940–944, deposed and blinded.
- Al-Mustakfi, 944–946, deposed and blinded.

=== Camerino ===
- Hubert, Duke of Spoleto, Margrave of Camerino 943–946, deposed 945/946, died 967/970.

=== Cappadocia ===
- Ariarathes VIII of Cappadocia, King of Cappadocia Ruler of Cappadocia c. 101 BCE – 96 BCE, deposed several times throughout his rule.
- Ariarathes IX of Cappadocia, King of Cappadocia, deposed several times throughout his reign.
- Ariobarzanes I Philoromaios of Cappadocia, King of Cappadocia from 95 BCE to c. 63 or 62 BCE, abdicated.

=== Principality of Capua ===
- Lando II of Capua, Count of Capua 861, deposed
- Pandenulf of Capua, Count of Capua 862–863 and 879–882
- Landenulf I of Capua, Count of Capua 885–887.
- Laidulf of Capua, Prince of Capua 993–999, deposed.
- Adhemar of Capua, Prince of Capua 1000, deposed by his own people.
- Pandulf IV of Capua, Prince of Capua 1016–1022, 1026–1038 and 1047–1050.
- Pandulf V of Capua, Prince of Capua 1022–1026, surrendered in 1026.
- Guaimar IV of Salerno, Duke of Gaeta 1038–1047, died 1052.

=== Duchy of Carinthia ===
- Berthold, Duke of Bavaria, 927–938, united Carinthia with the duchy of Bavaria in 938.
- Henry III, Duke of Bavaria, 976–978 and 985–989.
- Otto I, Duke of Carinthia, 978–985 and 1002–1004.
- Henry III, Holy Roman Emperor, 1039–1047.

=== Cerdanya ===
- Galindo Aznárez I, Count of Cerdanya 824–834, died 867.

=== China (Han dynasty) ===
- Prince He of Changyi, Emperor of China 74 BC, deposed, died 59 BC.
- Ruzi Ying, Emperor of China AD 6–AD 9, deposed, died 25.
- Liu Bian, Emperor of China 189, deposed, poisoned 190.

=== County of Conflent ===
- Aznar Galíndez I, 809–820, died 839.

=== Kingdom of Connacht ===
- Domnall Ua Conchobair, deposed 1106.
- Ruaidrí Ua Conchobair, deposed 1186.

== D ==
=== Denmark ===
- Eric III of Denmark, abdicated 1146.

=== Dublin ===
- Blácaire mac Gofrith King of Dublin 940 - 945 and 947 - 948 .
- Amlaíb Cuarán King of Dublin 945 - 947 and 952–980 .
- Godred Crovan King of Dublin 1079–1095, driven out of Dublin .
- Domnall mac Muirchertaig ua Briain King of Dublin c.1094–1102 and 1103–???? .
- Ascall mac Ragnaill King of Dublin 1160–1171, driven out and later killed .

=== Duklja ===
- Dobroslav II, King of Duklja 1101–1102, deposed and blinded.
- Dobroslav III, King of Duklja 1102, deposed, blinded and castrated.
- George I of Duklja, King of Duklja 1113–1118 and 1125–1131, deposed 1118, restored in 1125.

== E ==
=== County of Edessa ===
- Baldwin I of Jerusalem, count of Edessa 1098–1100, died 1118.
- Baldwin II of Jerusalem, count of Edessa 1100 to 1118, died 1131.
- Joscelin II, Count of Edessa, count of Edessa 1131–1150, died 1159.

=== Ancient Egypt ===
- Khamudi, Pharaoh 16th century BC, defeated by Ahmose I.
- Tantamani, Pharaoh 664–656 BC, defeated by the Neo-Assyrian Empire and returned to Kush.
- Teos of Egypt, Pharaoh 362–360 BC, overthrown, died in exile.
- Nectanebo II, Pharaoh 360–343 BC, deposed by the Persian conquest, fled into exile.

=== Ayyubid Egypt ===
- Al-Aziz Uthman, 1193–1198, died 1200.

=== Kingdom of England ===
- Aethelred the Unready, deposed 1013, regained the throne shortly before his death.
- Edger II, the Ætheling, 1066, deposed, died 1126

=== Kingdom of Essex ===
- Sæbbi of Essex, 664 to 694, abdicated 694
- Offa of Essex, ?-709, abdicated 709
- Sigeric, abdicated in 798.
- Sigered of Essex, 798-825, ceded his kingdom to Wessex

== F ==
=== Francia ===
- Charles the Fat, deposed 887.
- Charles the Simple, deposed 922.
- Hugh Capet, Duke of the Franks, 956–987, merged into the French Crown 987, died in 996.

=== Duchy of Friuli ===
- Ansfrid of Friuli, 694, blinded and exiled.
- Ratchis, 739–744, died after 756.
- Eberhard of Friuli, 846 to 863, died 866.
- Berengar I of Italy, 874–890, died 924.

== G ==
=== Duchy of Gaeta ===
- John V of Gaeta, 1012–1032, deposed in 1032, died 1040.
- Guaimar IV of Salerno, 1040–1041, died 1052.

=== Kingdom of Galicia ===
- Hermeric, 406 or 419–438, abdicated 438, died 441.
- Eboric, 583–584, deposed by Andeca.
- Andeca, 584–585, deposed 585.
- Malaric, 585, deposed and captured.
- Alfonso Fróilaz, 925–926, driven out 926.
- Alfonso IV of León, 929–931, abdicated, died 933.

=== Galilee ===
- Tancred FitzRobert, Prince of Galilee 1099–1101 deposed or abdicated, restored 1109–1112, died 1112.
- Joscelin I, Prince of Galilee, ? –1109, deposed or abdicated, restored 1112–1118.

=== Duchy of Gascony ===
- Bernard II Tumapaler, 1039 to 1052, died 1064/1090.

=== Ghaznavid Empire ===
- Ismail of Ghazni, 997–998, deposed by his brother Mahmud of Ghazni.
- Muhammad of Ghazni, 1030–1031 and 1039–1041, died 1041.

=== Goguryeo ===
- Bojang of Goguryeo, King 642–668, deposed 668, died 682.

=== Eastern Turkic Khaganate ===
- Illig Qaghan, 621–630, captured in 630.

=== Seljuk Empire ===
- Ahmad Sanjar, 1118–1153, deposed 1153, died 1157.

== H ==
=== Himyarite Kingdom ===
- Rabiah ibn Mudhar, deposed in the early 6th century.

=== Holy Roman Empire ===
- Charles the Fat, deposed 887.
- Lambert II of Spoleto, deposed 896.
- Louis the Blind, deposed 905.
- Berengar I of Italy, deposed 924.

=== Kingdom of Hungary ===
- Peter Orseolo, 1038–1041, 1041–1044 died 1046.
- Solomon, King of Hungary, 1063–1074, died 1087.
- Stephen III of Hungary, 1161–1162, 1163–1172, died 1172.
- Stephen IV of Hungary, 1163, died 1165.

== I ==
=== Caucasian Iberia ===
- Nerse of Iberia, ruling prince of Iberia from c. 760 to 772 and again from 775 to 779/80.

=== Iraq ===
- Sultan al-Daula, Buyid Amir of Iraq 1012–1021, deposed 1021, died 1024.
- Al-Malik al-Rahim, Buyid Amir of Iraq 1048–1055, died 1058/9.

=== Ireland ===
- Mael Seachlainn II Mór, High King of Ireland, deposed by Brian Ború in 1002, restored in 1014.

=== March of Istria ===
- Henry I of Istria, 1077–90, died 1127.
- Engelbert II of Istria, 1103–34, died 1141.
- Engelbert III, Margrave of Istria, 1134–71, died 1173.

=== Kingdom of Italy (Holy Roman Empire) ===
- Charles the Fat, 879–887, deposed, died 888.
- Louis the Blind, 900–905, deposed 905, died 928.
- Rudolph II of Burgundy, 922–926, deposed 926, died 937.
- Berengar II of Italy, 950–963, deposed 963, died 966.
- Conrad II of Italy, 1093–1098, deposed 1098, died 1101.

== J ==
=== Japan ===
- Empress Kōgyoku, 642–645 and 655–661.
- Empress Jitō, 686–697, died 702.
- Empress Genmei, 707–715, died 721.
- Empress Genshō, 715–724, died 748.
- Emperor Shōmu, 724–749, died 756.
- Emperor Junnin, 758–765, deposed and died shortly thereafter.
- Empress Kōken, 749–758 and 764–770, died 770.
- Emperor Kōnin, 770–781, died 782.
- Emperor Heizei, 806–809, died 824.
- Emperor Saga, 809–823, died 842.
- Emperor Junna, 823–833, died 840.
- Emperor Seiwa, 858–876, died 880.
- Emperor Yōzei, 876–884, died 949.
- Emperor Uda, 887–897, died 931.
- Emperor Daigo, 897–930, abdicated 930 and died shortly thereafter.
- Emperor Suzaku, 930–946, died 952.
- Emperor Reizei, 984, died 991.
- Emperor Kazan, 984–986, abdicated 986, died 1008.
- Emperor Ichijō, 986–1011, abdicated 1011, and died shortly thereafter.
- Emperor Sanjō, 1011–1016, abdicated 1016, died 1017.
- Emperor Go-Suzaku, 1036–1045, abdicated 1045, died shortly thereafter.
- Emperor Go-Sanjō, 1068–1073, abdicated, died shortly thereafter.
- Emperor Shirakawa, 1073–1087, abdicated 1087, died 1129.
- Emperor Toba, 1107–1123, abdicated 1123, died 1156.
- Emperor Sutoku, 1123–1142, deposed or abdicated 1142, died 1164.
- Emperor Go-Shirakawa, 1155–1158, abdicated 1158, died 1192.
- Emperor Nijō, 1158–1165, abdicated 1165 shortly before his death.
- Emperor Rokujō, 1165–1168, deposed 1168, died 1176.
- Emperor Takakura, 1168–1180, abdicated 1180, died 1181.
- Emperor Go-Toba, 1183–1198, abdicated 1198, died 1239.

=== Kingdom of Jerusalem ===
- Melisende, Queen of Jerusalem, 1131 to 1153, died 1161.

=== Jibal ===
- Fakhr al-Dawla, Buyid amir of Jibal 976–980 and 984–997, died 997.

=== Kingdom of Judah ===
- Jehoahaz of Judah, 609 BC, deposed by Necho II, died in exile.
- Zedekiah, 597 BCE – 587 BCE, deposed, captured, blinded and taken into captivity.

== K ==
=== Kashmir ===
- Nirjitavarman, King of Kashmir 907 and 923–924, deposed or abdicated 907, restored 923, died 924
- Partha, King of Kashmir 907–923 and 936, deposed or abdicated 923, restored 936, died 936.
- Chakravarman, King of Kashmir 935–936 and 936–938. Deposed 936, but restored shortly afterwards.
- Sussala, King of Kashmir 1113–1120 and 1120–1127. Deposed 1120, but restored shortly afterwards. Died 1127.

=== Kingdom of Kent ===
- Hlothhere of Kent, exiled in 685.
- Eadberht III Præn, 796–798. Deposed and captured by Cœnwulf of Mercia.
- Ceolwulf I of Mercia, 821 to 823, deposed 823.
- Baldred of Kent, until 825, when he was expelled by Æthelwulf of Wessex.

=== Greater Khorasan ===
- Muhammad ibn Tahir, governor of Khurasan, from 862 until 873, deposed, died around 890.

=== Pannonian Croatia ===
- Ljudevit Posavski, ruler of Khoruska within the Carolingian Empire, deposed 820, died 823.

=== Kievan Rus' ===
- Iziaslav I of Kiev, Grand Prince of Kiev 1054–1068 and 1069–1073, 1076–1078.
- Vseslav of Polotsk, Grand Prince of Kiev in 1068–1069, deposed 1069, died 1101.

== L ==
=== Kingdom of León ===
- Alfonso IV of León, King of León 925–931, abdicated, died 933.

=== Lesser Armenia ===
- Cotys IX, King of lesser Armenia, reigned 38 to until at least 47, forced to abdicate.

=== Lombardy ===
- Perctarit, King of the Lombards 661–662 and 671–688.
- Garibald, King of the Lombards 671, deposed in favour of his uncle Perctarit.
- Cunipert, King of the Lombards 688–689 and 689–700.
- Ratchis, King of the Lombards 744–749.

=== Lotharingia/Lorraine ===
- Charles the Fat, King of Lotharingia 882–887, deposed, died 888.
- Charles the Simple, King of Lotharingia 911–922, deposed 922, died 923.
- Henry I, Duke of Bavaria, Duke of Lorraine 939–940, deposed 940, died 955.

=== Lower Lorraine ===
- Conrad II of Italy, Duke of Lower Lorraine 1076–1087, died 1101.
- Henry, Duke of Lower Lorraine, Duke of Lower Lorraine 1101–1106, deposed 1106, died c. 1119.
- Godfrey I of Leuven, Duke of Lower Lorraine 1106–1128, deposed, died 1139.

=== Lusatia ===
- Conrad, Margrave of Meissen, Margrave of Lusatia 1136–1156, retired to a monastery and died 1157.

=== Lydia ===
- Croesus, King of Lydia, 560 BC – 547 BC, deposed by the Persians, 547 BC.

== M ==
=== Macedon ===
- Amyntas IV, King of Macedon, deposed 359 BC
- Antipater II, King of Macedon, deposed 294 BC.
- Demetrius I Poliorcetes, King of Macedon, deposed 288 BC.
- Meleager (king), King of Macedon 278 BC, deposed in that same year.
- Pyrrhus, King of Macedon and Epirus, deposed 285 BC, restored 274 BC.
- Antigonus II Gonatas, King of Macedon, deposed 274 BC, restored 272 BC.
- Perseus, deposed 168 BC.

=== County of Maine ===
- Fulk of Jerusalem, 1110–1126, died 1143.

=== Median Empire ===
- Astyages, 585 BCE–550 BCE, overthrown in 550.

=== Margraviate of Meissen ===
- Gunzelin, Margrave of Meissen, 1002–1009, deposed 1009, died c. 1017.
- Henry III, Holy Roman Emperor, 1046
- Egbert II, Margrave of Meissen, 1068–1090, deposed from Meissen 1090 and died soon thereafter.
- Conrad, Margrave of Meissen, 1123–1156, retired to a monastery and died 1157.

=== Mercia ===
- Æthelred of Mercia King of Mercia 675–704, abdicated 704
- Coenred of Mercia King of Mercia 704-709, abdicated 709
- Beornred of Mercia King of Mercia in 757, deposed and fled 757
- Ceolwulf I of Mercia King of Mercia 821 to 823, deposed 823
- Wiglaf of Mercia King of Mercia 827-829 and 830–839
- Burgred of Mercia King of Mercia 852–874, deposed 874
- Ælfwynn Lady of the Mercians, deposed 918

=== County of Mons ===
- Godfrey I, Count of Verdun, 974–998, deposed, died 1002.
- Reginar IV, Count of Mons, 973–974 and 998–1013.

=== Sultanate of Morocco ===
- Al-Hasan ibn Kannun, 954–974, deposed, died 985.
- Hammama Ibn El Moez, 1026–1033 and 1038–1040.

=== Mortain ===
- Henry II of England, Count of Mortain 1151–1153, died 1189

== N ==
=== Nanyue ===
- Zhao Jiande, King of Nanyue 112–111 BC, deposed by China in 111 BC.

=== Duchy of Naples ===
- Stephen II of Naples, 755–766, died 799.
- Theoctistus of Naples, 818–821, replaced by Byzantium.
- Contardus of Naples, 840, deposed by his people.
- Sergius II of Naples, 870–877, deposed and blinded by his brother.

=== Principality of Nitra ===
- Pribina, Prince of Nitra 839–861, expelled by Rastislav.

=== Kingdom of Northumbria ===
- Eadwulf I of Northumbria, 704-705, deposed and exiled
- Ceolwulf of Northumbria, 729–737, being deposed for a brief time in 731 or 732. He abdicated in 739 and entered a monastery
- Eadberht of Northumbria, 737 or 738–758, abdicated, died 768
- Æthelwald Moll of Northumbria, 759-765, deposed 765
- Alhred of Northumbria, 765-774, deposed and went into exile
- Æthelred I of Northumbria, 774-779 and 788/789-796
- Osred II of Northumbria, 789 to 790, deposed and went into exile
- Osbald of Northumbria, 796, abandoned by his people and went into exile
- Eardwulf of Northumbria, 796 to 806, deposed 806
- Æthelred II of Northumbria, c. 854-c. 858
- Amlaíb Cuarán, twice, 941-944
- Eric Bloodaxe, c. 948 and 952–954

=== Numidia ===
- Jugurtha, King of Numidia 117 to 105 BC, captured in war by Romans and executed in Rome 104 BC.
- Hiempsal II, King of Numidia 88 to 60 BC, deposed by the Numidians in 81, restored by Gnaeus Pompeius Magnus.

== P ==
=== Paris ===
- Odo of France, count of Paris until 888, died 898.

=== Parthian Empire ===
- Mithridates III of Parthia, 70–57 BC, deposed 57, died 53 BC.
- Vonones I, 8–12, deposed 12, died 19.
- Artabanus II of Parthia, 10–35 and 36–38, deposed 35, restored 36, died 38.
- Tiridates III of Parthia, 35–36 AD, deposed and fled to Syria.
- Vologases II of Parthia, 77–80, deposed.

=== Persian Empire ===
- Arsames, allegedly briefly king of Persia, deposed by Cyrus II.
- Bessus (Artaxerxes V), ruling over small parts of Persia 330–329 BC, ordered the killing of Darius III. He was deposed and handed over to Alexander by his own people.

=== Kingdom of Pontus ===
- Polemon II, king of Pontus and Cicilia 38–62, forced to abdicate in Pontus by Nero.

== Q ==
=== Qin ===
- Qin Shi Huang, King of Qin 246 BCE – 221 BCE, title merged into the imperial title of China 221 BCE, died 210 as Emperor of China.

== R ==
=== Rascia ===
- Uroš II Prvoslav Prince of Rascia 1140-around 1155 and 1155–1161
- Desa of Serbia Prince of Rascia 1155, 1162–1166

=== Rashtrakuta Kingdom ===
- Govinda IV, King of Rashtrakuta 930–935, deposed 935.

=== Rhine ===
- Henry II, Duke of Austria, Count Palatine of the Rhine 1140–1141, deposed 1141, died 1177.

=== Rome ===
- Vitellius, Emperor of Rome 69, abdicated a couple of days prior to execution.
- Valerian, Emperor of Rome 253–260, deposed and captured in 260.
- Diocletian, Emperor of Rome 284–305, abdicated 305, died 311.
- Maximian, Emperor of Rome 285–286, 286–305, 306–308, 310.

== S ==
=== Saffarid amirate ===
- Tahir I, Saffarid amir 901–908, deposed and imprisoned in Baghdad.
- Al-Layth, Saffarid amir 909–910, deposed, died 928.
- Mohammed I of Persia, Saffarid amir 910–911, deposed.

=== Principality of Salerno ===
- Sico of Salerno, 851–853, died 855.
- Adhemar of Salerno, 853–861, deposed by his own people.
- Manso I of Amalfi, 981–983, died 1004.
- John I of Amalfi, 981–982, died 1007.
- Gisulf II of Salerno, (1052–1077), died around 1090.

=== Samanid Empire ===
- Mansur II, 997–999, deposed and blinded.

=== Duchy of Saxony ===
- Theoderic, Duke of Saxony, 743–744, captured 744.
- Albert the Bear, 1138–42, abdicated 1142, died 1170.
- Henry the Lion, 1142–80, deposed 1180, died 1195.

=== Seleucid Empire ===
- Antiochus Hierax, separatist ruler of parts of the Seleucid empire 246–before 226 BC, waging war to govern all of Anatolia; he was defeated and expelled to Egypt, where he was killed by robbers.

=== Kingdom of Scotland ===
- Duncan II, deposed 1094.
- Donald III, deposed 1097.

=== Kingdom of Sicily ===
- William III, deposed 1194.

=== Sistan ===
- Abdallah ibn Ahmad, Amir of Sistan 922–923, deposed and captured.

=== Kingdom of Sweden ===
- Halsten Stenkilsson, King of Sweden 1067–1070 and 1079–1084.

== T ==
=== Tabaristan ===
- Shams al-Mo'ali Abol-hasan Ghaboos ibn Wushmgir, Ziyarid ruler 977–981, deposed, died 1012.

=== Taranto ===
- Bohemond II of Antioch, Prince of Taranto 1088–1128, died 1131.
- Roger II of Sicily, Prince of Taranto 1128–1131, died 1154.

=== Tuscany ===
- Boniface II, Margrave of Tuscany, Margrave of Tuscany 828–834, deposed 834, died 838.
- Lambert, Margrave of Tuscany, Margrave of Tuscany 929–931, deposed 931, died after 938.
- Boso, Margrave of Tuscany, Margrave of Tuscany 931–936, deposed 936, died 936.
- Rainier, Margrave of Tuscany, Margrave of Tuscany 1014–1027, deposed 1027 by Conrad II of the Holy Roman Empire.
- Welf II, Duke of Bavaria, Co-Margrave of Tuscany with his wife Matilda of Tuscany since 1089, left her side in 1095, died 1120.
- Engelbert III, Margrave of Istria, Margrave of Tuscany 1135–1137.
- Welf VI, Margrave of Tuscany 1152–1160 and 1167–1173.

== U ==
=== Upper Lorraine ===
- Godfrey III, Duke of Lower Lorraine, Duke of Lower Lorraine 1044–1047, deposed, died 1069.

=== Urgell ===
- Galindo I Aznárez, Count of Urgell, 834.

== V ==
=== Veleti ===
- Cealadragus, Prince of the Veleti, deposed in 823 by Milegast

=== Visigoths ===
- Wittiza (Achila), King of the Visigoths, deposed by Roderic in 710.

== W ==
=== Western Chalukya ===
- Someshvara II, King of Western Chalukya 1068–1076, deposed 1076.

=== Wessex ===
- Ceawlin of Wessex king of Wessex 560–592, deposed 592 and died 593
- Cenwalh of Wessex king of Wessex 643–645 and 648–674
- Centwine of Wessex king of Wessex 676–685/686, abdicated 685/686 .
- Cædwalla of Wessex king of Wessex 685 - 688, abdicated 688, died 689
- Ine of Wessex king of Wessex 688 to 726, abdicated 726 .
- Sigeberht of Wessex, 756–757, deposed and ultimately killed.
- Æthelwulf of Wessex King of Wessex 839 – 856, gave over control of western Wessex to his son Æthelbald of Wessex . Died 858

=== Wei ===
- Xian Wen Di, King of Wei 465–471, deposed or abdicated 471, died 475.

=== Wu ===
- Modi of Wu, King of Wu 264–280, deposed or abdicated 280, died 281.
- Jingdi of Wu, King of Wu 555–556, deposed or abdicated 556, died 558.
- Lin Hai Wang, King of Wu 566–568, deposed or abdicated 568, died 570.
- King Fuchai of Wu, King of Wu 495 BC – 473 BC, deposed 473 and committed suicide.
- Yu Chung-Kuang, King of Wu 961–976, deposed 976, died 978.

== Z ==
=== Zhao ===
- King Youmiu (幽繆王), King of Zhao 236 BC–228 BC, captured and deposed by Qin.
- King Dai (代王), King of Zhao 228 BC–222 BC captured and deposed by Qin.

== See also ==
- List of monarchs who abdicated
- List of monarchs who lost their thrones in the 19th century
- List of monarchs who lost their thrones in the 18th century
- List of monarchs who lost their thrones in the 17th century
- List of monarchs who lost their thrones in the 16th century
- List of monarchs who lost their thrones in the 15th century
- List of monarchs who lost their thrones in the 14th century
- List of monarchs who lost their thrones in the 13th century
