= List of monarchs who lost their thrones in the 18th century =

Monarchs deposed in the 18th century

This page has the monarchs who either lost their thrones through deposition by a coup d'état, by a referendum which abolished their throne, or chose to abdicate between 1700 and 1800

== Aceh Darussalam ==
- Baginda Seri Sultan Badrul Alam, Sultan of Aceh Darussalam. Deposed by the Uleebalang in 1702.
- Baginda Seri Sultan Sharif Lamtawi, Sultan of Aceh Darussalam. Deposed by the UleeBalang in 1703

== Ambohimanga ==
- Andrianjafy, King of Ambohimanga and Ambohitrabiby, deposed and killed, 1787.

== Ambohitrabiby ==
- Andrianjafy, King of Ambohimanga and Ambohitrabiby, deposed and killed in 1787.

== Ansbach ==
- Christian Frederick Charles Alexander, Margrave of Brandenburg-Ansbach and Bayreuth, abdicated 1791, died 1806.

== Banganapalle ==
- Mansur ud-Daula, Nawab Sayyid Ghulam Muhammad 'Ali Khan I Bahadur, Jagirdar of Banganapalle, deposed 1784, restored 1789.

== Bavaria ==
- Maximilian II Emanuel, Elector of Bavaria, deposed 1706, restored 1714.

== Bayreuth ==
- Christian Frederick Charles Alexander, Margrave of Brandenburg-Ansbach and Bayreuth, abdicated 1791, died 1806.

== Benares ==
- Rafa'at wa Awal-i-Martabat Raja Sri Chait Singh Sahib Bahadur, Raja of Benares, deposed 1781.

== Bentheim ==
- Friedrich Karl Philipp, Count of Bentheim, deposed by the Hannover in 1753. Died 1803.

== Brunswick-Wolfenbüttel ==
- Anton Ulrich Duke of Brunswick, deposed 1702, restored 1704, died 1714.

== Kingdom of Corsica ==
- Theodore of Corsica, 1736.

== France ==
- Louis XVI, King of France, deposed 1792, executed 1793.

== Hawaiʻi ==
- Kiwala‘o, High Chief and King of Hawaiʻi. Deposed and killed 1782 by his cousin Kamehameha I
- Kalanikupule, 27th Moi/King of Maui and Oaʻu. Deposed and sacrificed by Kamehameha I 1795
- Kaumualiʻi, 23rd King of Kauaʻi. Surrendered peacefully to Kamehameha I 1810

== Hohenlohe-Bartenstein ==
- Ludwig Karl Franz Leopold, Prince of Hohenlohe-Bartenstein, deposed or abdicated 1798.

== Isenburg-Marienborn ==
- Karl August of Karl August, Count of Isenburg-Marienborn, deposed 1725.

== Junagadh ==
- H.E. Shri Diwan Nawab Muhammad Mahabat Khanji I Bahadur Khanji, Nawab Sahib of Junagad, deposed 1760, reinstated 1762.

== Kantipura ==
- Jayaprakasamalla King (Rajadhiraja Paramesvara Paramabhattaraka Sri Sri N.N. Vijayarajye Nepala) of Kantipura 1735-1746, deposed or abdicated 1746, restored 1752, reigned until 25 September 1768.

== Kelantan ==
- Raja Long Sulaiman ibni al-Marhum Sultan Long Bahar, deposed 1739, restored 1746, redeposed 1756.

== Knyphausen ==
- William Graf von Bentinck und von Aldenburg baron of Knyphausen 1738-1754, deposed or abdicated 1754, died 1764.

== Kanokupolu ==
- Tu'ihalafata'i, 9th Tu'i Kanokupolu 1777-1782, abdicated 1782.
- Mulikiha'amea, 16th Tu'i Ha-a Takala'ua and 11th Tu'i Kanokupolu, reigned 1789, abdicated 1793
- Tupou Mohe'ofo, 12th Tu'i Kanokupolu reigned 1793, deposed 1793.

== Lalitapura ==
- Jayamahendramalla, King (Rajadhiraja Paramesvara Paramabhattaraka Sri Sri N.N. Vijayarajye Nepala) of Lalitapura 1709, deposed or abdicated 1709, restored 1709, reigned until 1714.

== Lippe-Alverdissen ==
- Friedrich Ernst of Lippe-Alverdissen, Count and Noble Lord (Graf und Edler Herr zur Lippe). Deposed or abdicated 1749.

== Lippe-Detmold ==
- Simon August of Lippe-Detmold, Count and Noble Lord (Graf und Edler Herr zur Lippe) of Lippe-Detmold 1734-1749, deposed or abdicated 1749. Died 1782.

== Lorraine ==
- Francis Stephen, Duke of Lorraine, abdicated 1737

== Mecca ==
- Sharif Sa'ad Pasha, Grand Sharif of Mecca. Deposed 1672, restored 1693, redeposed 1694, restored 1694, redeposed 1702.
- Sharif 'Abdu'l-Muhsin bin Ahmad, Grand Sharif of Mecca, deposed 1704.

== Modena ==
- Ercole III d'Este, Duke of Modena, deposed 1796

== Naples ==
- Philip IV, King of Naples (and Spain), lost control of Naples 1707, abandoned claims 1713
- Charles VI, King of Naples (and Holy Roman Emperor), ceded control 1735
- Charles VII, King of Naples, abdicated 1759
- Ferdinand IV, King of Naples, deposed 1799, restored later that year, deposed again 1806, restored 1815

== Parma ==
- Charles I, Duke of Parma, abdicated 1735
- Maria Theresa, Duchess of Parma, abdicated 1748

== Persia ==
- Husayn, Shah of Persia, deposed 1722
- Ashraf Hotaki, Shah of Persia, deposed 1729
- Abbas III, Shah of Persia, deposed 1736
- Adil Shah, Shah of Persia, deposed 1748
- Suleiman II, Shah of Persia, deposed 1750
- Shahrokh Shah, Shah of Persia, deposed 1749, nominally restored 1750, deposed again 1796

== Poland ==
- Augustus II, King of Poland, deposed 1704, abdicated 1706, restored 1709
- Stanislaus I, deposed 1709, restored 1733 and again deposed later that year
- Stanislaus II Augustus Poniatowski, King of Poland, deposed 1795

== Russia ==
- Ivan VI, Emperor of Russia, deposed 1741
- Peter III, Emperor of Russia, deposed 1762

== Sardinia ==
- Charles VI, Holy Roman Emperor, King of Sardinia, exchanged for Sicily 1720
- Victor Amadeus II, King of Sardinia, abdicated 1730

== Sicily ==
- Victor Amadeus II, King of Sicily, exchanged for Sardinia 1720
- Charles V, King of Sicily, abdicated 1759

== Spain ==
- "Charles III," Austrian claimant to the Spanish throne, abandoned his claims 1714
- Philip V, King of Spain, abdicated 1724, reinstated later that year

== Sweden ==
- Ulrika Eleonora, Queen of Sweden, abdicated 1720

== Tallo ==
- Karaeng Sapanang Tu-Timoka, Sultan of Tallo, deposed 1761.

== Tulsipur ==
- Raja Nawal Singh Chauhan lost Tulsipar to Gorkhali King Prithvi Narayan, 1763.

== Tuscany ==
- Peter Leopold, Grand Duke of Tuscany, abdicated 1790

== Vava'u ==
- Vuna of Konokupolu and Vava'u, 5th Tu'i Kanokupolu, deposed 1700.
- Takitakimalohi, 3rd Vuna and Tu'i Vava'u, deposed 1799.

== See also ==
- List of monarchs who abdicated
- List of monarchs who lost their thrones in the 19th century
- List of monarchs who lost their thrones in the 17th century
- List of monarchs who lost their thrones in the 16th century
- List of monarchs who lost their thrones in the 15th century
- List of monarchs who lost their thrones in the 14th century
- List of monarchs who lost their thrones in the 13th century
- List of monarchs who lost their thrones before the 13th century
