= Monarch =

Person at the head of a monarchy

A monarch (/ˈmɒnərk/, /ˈmɒnɑːrk/) is the head of state of a monarchy. A monarch usually exercises the highest authority and power in the state. Usually, a monarch either personally inherits the lawful right to exercise the state's sovereign rights (often referred to as the throne or the crown) or is selected by an established process from a family or cohort eligible to provide the nation's monarch. Alternatively, an individual may proclaim oneself monarch, or even usurp power, as many Ancient Greek tyrants did. If a young child is crowned the monarch, then a regent is often appointed to govern until the monarch reaches the requisite adult age to rule.

== Characteristics ==
Monarchs, as such, bear a variety of titles – king or queen, prince or princess (e.g., Sovereign Prince of Monaco), emperor or empress (e.g., Emperor of China, Emperor of Ethiopia, Emperor of Japan, Emperor of India), archduke, duke or grand duke (e.g., Grand Duke of Luxembourg), emir (e.g., Emir of Qatar), sultan (e.g., Sultan of Oman), pharaoh, shah, etc.

Monarchy is political or sociocultural in nature, and is generally (but not always) associated with hereditary rule. Most monarchs, both historically and in the present day, have been born and brought up within a royal family (whose rule over a period of time is referred to as a dynasty) and trained for future duties. Different systems of succession have been used, such as proximity of blood (male preference or absolute), primogeniture, agnatic seniority, Salic law, etc. While traditionally most monarchs have been male, female monarchs have also ruled, and the term queen regnant refers to a ruling monarch, as distinct from a queen consort, the wife of a reigning king.

In an elective monarchy, the monarch is elected but otherwise serves as any other monarch. Historical examples of elective monarchy include the Holy Roman Emperors (chosen by prince-electors, but often coming from the same dynasty) and the free election of kings of the Polish–Lithuanian Commonwealth. Modern examples include the Yang di-Pertuan Agong (lit. "He Who is Made Lord') of Malaysia, who is appointed by the Conference of Rulers every five years or after the king's death, and the pope of the Roman Catholic Church, who serves as sovereign of the Vatican City State and is elected to a life term by the College of Cardinals.

In recent centuries, many states have abolished the monarchy and become republics. Advocacy of government by a republic is called republicanism, while advocacy of monarchy is called monarchism. A principal advantage of hereditary monarchy is the immediate continuity of national leadership, as illustrated in the classic phrase "The [old] King is dead. Long live the [new] King!". In cases where the monarch serves mostly as a ceremonial figure (e.g., most modern constitutional monarchies), real leadership does not depend on the monarch.

== Succession ==
Hereditary succession within one patrilineal family has been most common (but see the Rain Queen), with a preference for children over siblings, and sons over daughters. In Europe, some people practiced equal division of land and regalian rights among sons or brothers, as in the Germanic states of the Holy Roman Empire, until after the medieval era and sometimes (e.g., Ernestine duchies) into the 19th century. Other European realms practiced one or another form of primogeniture, in which a lord was succeeded by his eldest son or, if he had none, by his brother, his daughters or sons of daughters.

The system of tanistry practiced among Celtic tribes was semi-elective and gave weight also to ability and merit.

The Salic law, practiced in France and in the Italian territories of the House of Savoy, stipulated that only men could inherit the crown. In most fiefs, in the event of the demise of all legitimate male members of the patrilineage, a female of the family could succeed (semi-Salic law). In most realms, daughters and sisters were eligible to succeed a ruling kinsman before more distant male relatives (male-preference primogeniture), but sometimes the husband of the heiress became the ruler, and most often also received the title, jure uxoris.

In 1980, Sweden became the first monarchy to declare equal primogeniture, absolute primogeniture or full cognatic primogeniture, meaning that the eldest child of the monarch, whether female or male, ascends to the throne. Other nations have since adopted this practice: Netherlands in 1983, Norway in 1990, Belgium in 1991, Denmark in 2009, and Luxembourg in 2011. The United Kingdom adopted absolute (equal) primogeniture on April 25, 2013, following agreement by the prime ministers of the sixteen Commonwealth Realms at the 22nd Commonwealth Heads of Government Meeting.

In some monarchies, such as Saudi Arabia, succession to the throne usually first passes to the monarch's next eldest brother and so on through his other brothers, and only after them to the monarch's children (agnatic seniority). In some other monarchies (e.g., Jordan), the monarch chooses who will be his successor within the royal family, who need not necessarily be his eldest son.

Some monarchies are elective, such as (UAE, Malaysia, Holy See and Cambodia), meaning that the monarch is elected instead of assuming office due to direct inheritance. Rules and laws regarding election vary country to country.

There have been many cases of a monarch being overthrown and replaced by a usurper who would often install his own family on the throne.

== Examples of monarchs ==
A series of pharaohs ruled Ancient Egypt over the course of three millennia (c. 3150 BC to 31 BC) until it was conquered by the Roman Empire.

The concept of monarchy existed in the Americas long before the arrival of European colonialists. When the Europeans arrived they referred to these tracts of land within territories of different aboriginal groups to be kingdoms, and the leaders of these groups were often referred to by the Europeans as Kings, particularly hereditary leaders.

The first local monarch to emerge in North America after colonization was Jean-Jacques Dessalines, who declared himself Emperor of Haiti on September 22, 1804. Haiti again had an emperor, Faustin I from 1849 to 1859. In South America, Brazil had a royal house ruling as emperor between 1822 and 1889, under emperors Pedro I and Pedro II.

== See also ==
- Lists of monarchs
