= Hermeric =

King of the Suebi (died 441)

- King of the Suevi
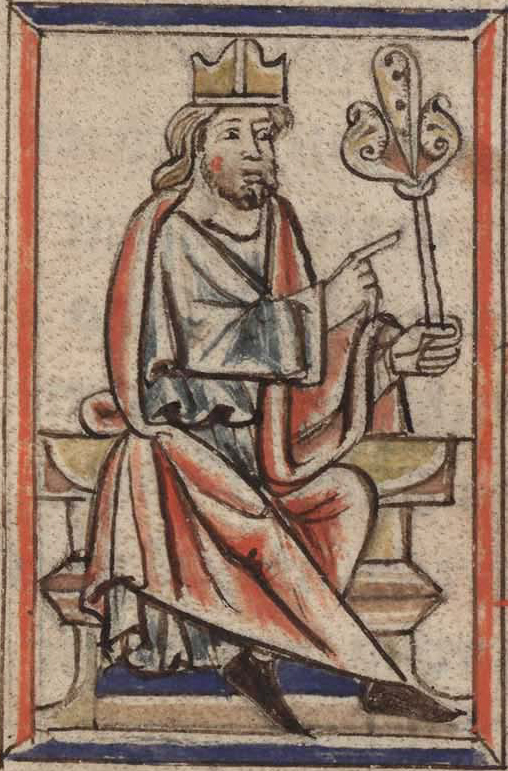
- Later medieval representation of Hermeric
- Reign: bef. 419–438
- Successor: Rechila
- Born: c. 380; Germania
- Died: 441; Braga
- Issue: Rechila
- Religion: Germanic paganism

Hermeric (died 441) was the king of the Suevi from at least 419 and possibly as early as 406 until his abdication in 438.

== Biography ==
=== Before 419 ===
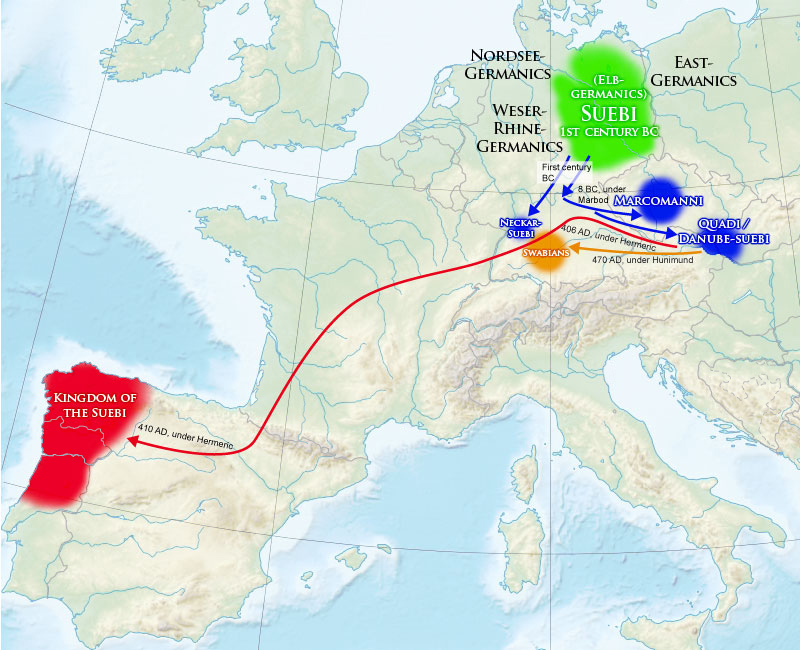
Suebic migrations across Europe.

Nothing is known for sure about Hermeric before 419, the year in which he is first mentioned; namely, he became king of the Suebi (or Suevi) in the city of Braga (Bracara Augusta) according to bishop Hydatius (who wrote his chronicle around the year 470). Although bishop Isidore of Seville, writing his Historia de regibus Gothorum, Vandalorum et Suevorum two centuries after the fact, claims that Hermeric was already king of the Suebi from 406, Isidore based himself on primarily on Jerome, Hydatius, Prosper of Aquitaine and Orosius, none of whom mentions Hermeric prior to 419.

Hermeric was a pagan and an enemy of the Roman Empire throughout his life. He is given a reign of thirty-two years in most manuscripts of Isidore of Seville's Historia Suevorum, but one manuscript does list his reign as fourteen years.

According to Thompson (1982)'s interpretation of Isidore, Hermeric led the Suevi across the Rhine along with the Vandals and Alans in December 406. They crossed Gaul and the Pyrenees and settled in Hispania. Kulikowski (2000 & 2015) argued that the Suebi probably stayed in northern Gaul throughout 407 to 409, and moved to Galicia between 409 and 411. While Theodore Mommsen believed the Suevi were foederati and Ernst Stein seconded the notion by believing they had made an agreement with the Roman usurper Magnus Maximus whereby they received the western half of Iberia, there is no primary evidence for any alliance between the Suevi and Rome. In 411 (according to Ludwig Schmidt) or 417 (according to Felix Dahn), Hermeric made a treaty with the Roman emperor Honorius, but in fact the only event of note in 411 was the division of Iberia sorte (by lot) between the barbarian peoples. The west of the province of Gallaecia with its capital of Braga (Bracara Augusta) fell to the Suevi, while the east of the province went to the populous Hasdingi. Between 416 and 418, the Visigoths under Wallia made war on Hermeric on behalf of Rome.

=== After 419 ===
Timeline of the Suebic Kings

In 419, after a personal dispute between Hermeric and the Vandal king Gunderic, the Vandals attacked the Suevi and trapped Hermeric in the Narbasian (Erbasian) Mountains before the Roman general Asterius intervened and the Vandals retreated. Thereafter, until the Vandals left Iberia for Africa in 429, Hermeric remained peaceful, but in 430 he began to raid Gallaecia.

In 431 a Gallaecian named Hydatius went to Flavius Aëtius to plead for help against the Suevi, but Aëtius delayed until 432 the sending of the comes Censorius. According to Hydatius' Chronicle of contemporary events, the Gallaecian plebs in the better-fortified strongpoints defeated Hermeric and his men, inflicting heavy casualties and taking many prisoners, which forced the Sueves to release the Gallaecian families they had taken captive (430).

In 435, "on episcopal intervention", possibly Hydatius', Hermeric made peace with the Gallaecians. In that same year, Hermeric negotiated through the Catholic bishop Symphosius directly with the Western Roman Emperor. In 437, Censorius made a second expedition accompanied by Fretimund.

After seven years of illness, Hermeric was forced to retire from the kingship in 438 and pass it on to his son Rechila. The story, recorded in Isidore, that Hermeric sent Rechila to Baetica to defeat Andevotus, Romanae militiae dux, is false, as there is no contemporary evidence that Hermeric retained any authority after his abdication. There appears to have been no principle of elective monarchy among the Suevi and the successes of their raids may have accounted for the contentment of their people. Hermeric's royal line lasted until 456.

In 429, there appeared briefly a Suevic military leader named Heremigarius operating in Lusitania who may have been a joint monarch with Hermeric, but there is no primary source to prove it.

== See also ==
- Cindazunda

== Sources ==
- Thompson, E. A. Romans and Barbarians: The Decline of the Western Empire. Madison: University of Wisconsin Press, 1982. ISBN 0-299-08700-X.
- Kulikowski, Michael. "The Career of the 'Comes Hispaniarum' Asterius." Phoenix, Vol. 54, No. 1/2. (Spring–Summer, 2000), pp. 123–141.

| Gallaecia divided | King of Galicia bef. 409–438 | Succeeded by Rechila |
