= List of monarchs who lost their thrones in the 13th century =

This is a list of monarchs who lost their thrones in the 13th century.

== Austria ==
- Rudolph I of Germany, Holy Roman King, Duke of Austria 1278–1282, then gave the duchy to Albert I and Rudolf II, died 1291.

== Blue Horde ==
- Talabuga, Khan of the Blue Horde 1287–1291, dethroned.

== Bosnia ==
- Stjepan Kulinić, Bosnian Ban in 1204–1232, deposed, died 1236.

== Bulgaria ==
- Boril, Emperor of Bulgaria 1207 to 1218, deposed and blinded 1218.
- Kaliman II, Emperor of Bulgaria 1256, forced to flee the capital, murdered 1256.
- Mitso Asen, Emperor of Bulgaria 1256 to 1257, lost power 1257, died 1277/1278.
- Michael Asen II, Emperor of Bulgaria 1277 to 1279, lost power and captured by the Byzantines.
- Ivan Asen III, Emperor of Bulgaria 1279–1280, deposed, died in exile in 1303.
- Ivaylo, Emperor of Bulgaria 1277 to 1280, lost power, murdered 1281.
- George I Terter, Emperor of Bulgaria 1280–1292, abdicated 1292, died in 1308/1309.
- Ivan II, Emperor of Bulgaria 1298 to 1299, deposed, died in exile before 1330.

== Byzantine Empire ==
- Isaac II Angelus, deposed 1195, restored 1203, deposed again 1204.
- Alexius III Angelus, deposed 1203.
- Alexius IV Angelus, deposed 1204.
- Alexius V, deposed 1204.
- John IV Lascaris, deposed 1261.

== Chagatai Khanate ==
- Qara Hülëgü, head of the ulus of the Chagatai Khanate 1242–1246 and 1252, deposed 1246, restored 1252, died 1252.
- Yesü Möngke, 1252, exiled and executed.
- Mubarak Shah, 1252–1260 and 1266.

== Damascus ==
- As-Salih Ismail, Sultan of Damascus 1237 and 1239–1245.
- As-Salih Ayyub, Sultan of Damascus 1239 and 1245–1249.

== Egypt ==
- an-Nasir Nasir-ad-Din Muhammad, Mameluke sultan of Egypt 1293–1295, 1299–1309 and 1309–1340.

== Epirus ==
- Theodore Komnenos Doukas, Despot of Epirus 1215–1230, died c. 1253.

== Golden Horde ==
- Talabuga Khan of the Golden Horde 1287–1291, dethroned.

== Holy Roman Empire ==
- Otto IV, Holy Roman Emperor, deposed 1215.
- Adolf, King of the Romans, deposed 1298.

== Ilkhanate ==
- Tekuder, Ilkhan 1282–1284, deposed and executed.

== Istria ==
- Henry II of Meran, Ruler of Istria 1204–1209, died 1228.
- Otto of Meran, 1215–1230, died 1234.

== Japan ==
=== Emperors ===
- Emperor Tsuchimikado, Emperor of Japan 1198–1210, abdicated 1210, died 1231.
- Emperor Juntoku, Emperor of Japan 1210–1221, abdicated 1221, died 1242.
- Emperor Chūkyō, Emperor of Japan 1221, deposed 1221, died 1234.
- Emperor Go-Horikawa, Emperor of Japan 1221–1232, abdicated 1232, died 1234.
- Emperor Go-Saga, Emperor of Japan 1242–1246, abdicated 1246, died 1272.
- Emperor Go-Fukakusa, Emperor of Japan 1246–1260, abdicated 1260, died 1304.
- Emperor Kameyama, Emperor of Japan 1260–1274, abdicated 1274, died 1305.
- Emperor Go-Uda, Emperor of Japan 1274–1287, abdicated 1287, died 1324.
- Emperor Fushimi, Emperor of Japan 1287–1298, abdicated 1298, died 1317.

=== Shōguns ===
- Minamoto no Yoriie, Kamakura Shōgun 1202–1203, forced to abdicate 1203, died 1204.
- Kujō Yoritsune, Kamakura Shōgun 1226–1244, abdicated 1244, died 1256.

== Latin Empire ==
- Baldwin II of Courtenay, emperor of the Latin empire 1228–1261, deposed.

== Lithuania ==
- Treniota, Grand Prince of Lithuania (1263–1264, deposed 1264.
- Shvarn, Grand Prince of Lithuania (1267–1269), deposed, died 1269 or 1271.

== Lorraine ==
- Simon II, Duke of Lorraine, Duke of Lorraine 1176–1205, in 1205 he retired to a monastery, died 1207.

== Nassau ==
- Henry II of Nassau, Count of Nassau 1198–1249, ceased to reign 1249, died 1251.

== Neuenburg-Strassberg ==
- Berthold I of Neuenburg-Strassberg, ruler of Neuenburg-Strassberg 1225–1270, died 1273.

== Nuremberg ==
- Frederick II of Nuremberg, Burgrave of Nuremberg 1204–1218, title passed over to Conrad I, Burgrave of Nuremberg.

== Portugal ==
- Sancho II of Portugal, King in 1223, deposed in 1247 by his brother Alphonse, Count Consort of Boulogne.

== Poznań ==
- Mieszko III the Old, Prince of Poznań 1177–1179 and 1194–1202, died 1202.
- Boleslaw V the Holy, Prince of Poznań 1241–1247 and 1257–1277, died 1279.

== Rascia ==
- Vukan Nemanjić, Grand Prince of Rascia 1202–1204, lost the throne to Stefan Nemanjić.
- Stefan Nemanjić, Grand Prince of Rascia 1196–1202 and 1204–1217, deposed by Vukan Nemanjić, restored in 1204, lost the throne when the title was abolished.

== Scotland ==
- John, King of Scots, deposed 1296.

== Sicily ==
- Conradin, King of Sicily, deposed 1258 or 1268.
- Charles I, King of Sicily, deposed in Sicily itself (though not in Naples), 1282.
- James, King of Sicily, abdicated 1296.

== Split ==
- Matej Ninoslav, Prince of Split, deposed, 1244.

== Świecie ==
- Mestwin II, Duke of Świecie, deposed in 1269, regained throne the same year
- Wartislaw II of Gdańsk, Duke of Świecie, deposed in 1269

== Thessalonica ==
- Theodore Komnenos Doukas, Emperor of Thessalonica 1224 to 1230, died c. 1253.

== Empire of Trebizond ==
- Georgios Komnenos, Emperor 1266 to 1280, died after 1284

== Wales ==
- Llywelyn ap Gruffudd, Prince of Wales, murdered at Cilmeri, Dec 11th 1282.
- Dafydd ap Gruffydd, Prince of Wales, Put to death - Shrewsbury October 3, 1283.

== See also ==
- List of monarchs who abdicated
- List of monarchs who lost their thrones in the 19th century
- List of monarchs who lost their thrones in the 18th century
- List of monarchs who lost their thrones in the 17th century
- List of monarchs who lost their thrones in the 16th century
- List of monarchs who lost their thrones in the 15th century
- List of monarchs who lost their thrones in the 14th century
- List of monarchs who lost their thrones before the 13th century
