= List of monarchs who lost their thrones in the 19th century =

This is a list of monarchs who either lost their thrones through deposition by a coup d'état, by a referendum which abolished their throne, or chose to abdicate during the 19th century.

== A ==
=== Afghanistan ===
- Zaman Shah, deposed 1801.
- Mahmud Shah Durrani, deposed 1803, reinstated 1809, deposed again 1818.
- Shoja Shah, deposed 1809, reinstated 1839.
- Dost Mohammad Khan, deposed 1839, reinstated 1842.
- Wazir Akbar Khan, retired 1843.
- Sher Ali Khan, deposed 1866, reinstated 1868.
- Mohammad Yaqub Khan, deposed 1879.
- Ayub Khan, deposed 1880.

=== Algeria ===
- Hussein ben Hassan, Dey of Algeria, surrendered to invading French forces on 5 July 1830.

=== Alt-Leiningen ===
- Christian Karl of Alt-Leiningen, Count of Alt-Leiningen 1770–1801. Deposed or abdicated 1801. Died 1803.

=== amaGaza ===
- Mawewe Nxumalo, Nkosi of amaGaza 11 Oct 1858 – 18??, deposed or abdicated 18??, restored 18??, reigned until 1862.
- Mzila Nxumalo, Nkosi of amaGaza, deposed or abdicated 18??, restored 1862, reigned until August 1884.

=== Antakarana ===
- Tsialana II, King of Antakarana, deposed 1895.

=== Aremberg ===
- Ludwig Engelbert, Duke of Aremberg (Herzog von Aremberg) 1778–1801, deposed or abdicated 1801. Died 1820.
- Prosper Ludwig, Duke of Aremberg (Herzog von Aremberg) 1802–1810, deposed or abdicated 1810. Died 1861.

=== Bishopric of Augsburg ===
- Klemens Wenzeslaus von Sachsen, Prince-Bishop of Augsburg, deposed 1802 upon Augsburg's annexation by Bavaria, died 1812.

=== Austria ===
- Emperor Ferdinand I, abdicated 1848.

== B ==
=== Grand Duchy of Baden ===
- Ludwig II, Grand Duke of Baden, abdicated 1856.

=== Bahrain ===
- Shaikh Muhammad bin Khalifa al-Khalifa, deposed 1868.

=== Bajini ===
- Hashimu bin Ahmed, 3 times Sultan of Bajini, 18xx–18xx, 18xx–1886, 1889.

=== Baku Khanate ===
- Husayn Quli Khan, Khan of Baku, deposed due to Russian annexation, 1806.

=== Balasinor ===
- Nawab Shri Muhammad 'Abid Khan Naver Khan Babi, Nawab Sahib of Balasinor 1820–1822, deposed 1822.

=== Bambao ===
- Ahmed bin Shekhe Ngome, Sultan of Bambao, reigned 4 times in the 19th century.
- Abdallah bin Saidi Hamza, Sultan of Bambao, reigned 3 times in the 19th century.
- Mohamed bin Ahmed of Bambao, Sultan of Bambao, reigned 2 times in the 19th century.
- Mwenye Mji, Sultan of Bambao, reigned 2 times in the 19th century.
- Saidi Bakari bin Ahmed, Sultan of Bambao, reigned 2 times in the 19th century.

=== Banten ===
- Maulana Muhammad Shafiuddin of Banten, reigned at a very young age, deposed in 1813 by the British and exiled to Surabaya, died in 1898.

=== Prince-Bishopric of Bamberg ===
- Christoph Franz von Buseck, Prince-Bishop of Bamberg (Fürstbishof zu Bamberg), deposed in 1802 due to Bamberg's annexation by Bavaria, died 1805.

=== Banganapalle ===
- Nawab Sayyid Husain Ali II Khan Bahadur, Jagirdar of Banganapalle, deposed 1832, restored 1848.

=== Baoni ===
- Sahib Jah, Azam ul-Umara, Rashid ul-Mulk, 'Imad ud-Daula, Nawab Mir Mehdi Husain Khan Bahadur, Firuz Jang, Nawab of Baoni 1859–1883, abdicated in favor of his son, died 1895.

=== Kingdom of Bavaria ===
- Ludwig I, King of Bavaria 1825–1848, abdicated 1848, died 1868.

=== Berg and Cleves ===
- Wilhelm, Duke of Berg and Cleves, deposed 1806
- Joachim Murat, Grand Duke of Berg, abdicated 1808.
- Napoléon Louis Bonaparte, Grand Duke of Berg 1809–1813, deposed 1813.

=== Birkenfeld ===
- Wilhelm, Count Palatine of Birkenfeld, deposed due to Birkenfeld's annexation by France, 1801.

=== Boina Kingdom ===
- Andriantsoly, King of Boina, deposed or abdicated 1832
- Tsiomeko, Queen of Boina, deposed 1840.

=== Bora Bora ===
- Princess Ari'i-'Otare Teari'i-maeva-rua II, deposed by the French, 19 March 1888.

=== Barotseland ===
- Lubosi I, Litunga of the Lozi and Paramount Chief of Barotseland, deposed 1884, restored 1885, died 1916.
- Akafuna Tatila, Litunga of the Lozi and Paramount Chief of Barotseland, deposed 1885, died 1887.

=== Bone State ===
- La Mappatunru To' Wappatunru' Paduka Sri Sultan Muhammad Ismail Mukhtaj ud-din (MatinroE-ri Lalang-bata), Arumpone of Bone 1812–1823, deposed or abdicated 1823, d.1825.

=== Empire of Brazil ===
- King João VI, lost the crown 1822.
- Emperor Pedro I, abdicated 1831.
- Emperor Pedro II, deposed 1889.

=== Brakna ===
- Sidi Mukhtar wuld Sidi Muhammad, Emir of Brakna 1841–1843, deposed or abdicated 1843.

=== Brunswick ===
- Frederick William, Duke of Brunswick-Lüneburg, Duke of Brunswick 1806–1807, deposed 1807, restored 1813.
- Charles II, Duke of Brunswick-Lüneburg, Duke of Brunswick 1815–1831, deposed 1831, died 1873.

=== Buganda ===
- Mwanga II, Kabaka of Buganda 1884–1888 and 1889–1897, died 1897.
- Kalema, Kabaka of Buganda 1888–1889, died 1890.

=== Bunyoro ===
- Chwa II Kabarega, ruler of Bunyoro 1869–1873, died 1898.

=== Burma ===
- Bagyidaw, King of Burma, deposed 1837.
- Pagan Min II, King of Burma, abdicated 1853.
- Thibaw Min, King of Burma, deposed 1885.

== C ==
=== Cambodia ===
- Ang Duong II, deposed 1844, reinstated 1845, d.1860.
- Queen Ba-cong-chua, deposed 1841, reinstated 1844, deposed again 1845.

=== Chitral ===
- Mehtar Sher Afzal, Mehtar of Chitral and Yasin, deposed 1893.
- Mehtar Muhammad Amir ul-Mulk, Mehtar of Chitral and Yasin, deposed 1895.

=== Prince-Bishopric of Constance ===
- Karl Theodor Anton Maria Freiherr von Dalberg, Prince-Bishop of Constance, deposed due to annexation by Baden in 1802.

=== Imperial Abbey of Corvey ===
- Ferdinand Freiherr von Lüning, Prince-Bishop of Corvey, deposed due to the annexation of the state by the Prince of Orange-Nassau in 1802.

=== Croy-Dülmen ===
- August, Count of Croy-Dülmen, deposed due to the annexation of Croy-Dülmen by Arenberg in 1806.

== E ==
=== Egypt Eyalet ===
- Muhammad 'Ali Pasha, Wāli of Egypt, abdicated 1848.
- Ismail Pasha, Khedive of Egypt, deposed 1879.

=== Prince-Bishopric of Eichstätt ===
- Joseph Graf von Stubenberg, Prince-Bishop of Eichstätt, deposed when Bavaria annexed Eichstätt in 1802.

=== Elchingen ===
- Robert II Plersch, Abbot of Elchingen, deposed 1803 following annexation of Elchingen by Bavaria.

=== Prince-Provostry of Ellwangen ===
- Clemens Wenzel of Saxony, Prince-Provost of the College, deposed due to annexation by Württemberg, 1803.

=== Essen Abbey ===
- Maria Kunigunde Herzogin von Sachsen, Princess-Abbess of Essen, deposed due to annexation by Prussia, 1802.

=== Ethiopian Empire ===
- Tekle Giyorgis I (Fakr Sagad), Emperor of Ethiopia, succeeded upon the deposition of Emperor Iyasu III, 24 April 1788. Deposed for a second time 26 July 1789. Regained the throne by force of arms in January 1794. Deposed for the third time, 15 April 1795. Restored December 1795. Deposed for the fourth time, 20 May 1796. Restored again 4 January 1798. Deposed for the fifth time on 20 May 1799. Restored 24 March 1800 but was then deposed for the sixth and last time.
- Demetros, Emperor of Ethiopia, installed 1799 and deposed 1800, reinstated 1800, deposed again 1801.
- Yohannes III, Emperor of Ethiopia, installed 1840, deposed 1841, reinstated and deposed again 1845, reinstated again 1850, and deposed again 1851.
- Sahle Dengel, Emperor of Ethiopia, installed 1832, deposed 1840, restored 1841, deposed again 1845, reinstated again 1845, deposed again 1850, reinstated again 1851 and deposed for the last time in 1855.
- Tewodros II, Emperor of Ethiopia, died 1868.
- Tekle Giyorgis II, Emperor of Ethiopia, deposed in 1872 by Kassay Merca, who was then proclaimed Emperor Yohannes IV.

== F ==
=== France ===
- Napoleon I, Emperor of the French, abdicated 1814, reinstated and deposed 1815.
- Louis XVIII, King of France, deposed 1815, reinstated 1815.
- Napoleon II, Emperor of the French, deposed 1815.
- Charles X, King of France, abdicated 1830.
- Louis XIX, King of France (pretender), abdicated 1830.
- Henri V, King of France (pretender), deposed 1830.
- Louis Philippe I, King of the French, abdicated 1848.
- Napoleon III, Emperor of the French, deposed 1870.

=== Frankfurt ===
- Carl Theodor Reichsfreiherr von Dalberg, Prince of Frankfurt 1806–1810 and Grand Duke of Frankfurt 1810–1813, deposed or abdicated 1813, died 1817.
- Eugène de Beauharnais, Grand Duke of Frankfurt 1813, deposed or abdicated 1813, died 1824.

=== Prince-Bishopric of Freising ===
- Joseph Konrad Graf von Schroffenberg-Mös, Prince-Bishop of Freising, annexed by Bavaria 1803.

=== Freudenberg ===
- Benedict Kirchner, Seigneur-Abbot of Freudenberg, annexed by France 1801.

=== Friedberg in der Wetterau ===
- Clemens Augustus Freiherr von Westphalen zu Fürstenberg, Burgrave of Friedberg in der Watterau, lands annexed by Hesse-Darmstadt 1806.

=== Imperial Abbey of Fulda ===
- Adalbert III von Herstal, Prince-Bishop of Fulda, deposed 1802.

=== Fürstenberg ===
- Charles Egon II, Prince of Fürstenberg, deposed through the annexation of Fürstenberg by Baden in 1806, died 1854.

== G ==
=== Gandersheim Abbey ===
- Auguste Dorothea Herzogin von Braunschweig, Princess-Abbess of Gandersheim, deposed in 1802 following the annexation of Gandersheim by the Duchy of Brunswick.

=== Ganja Khanate ===
- Javad Khan (1786–1804), deposed through the Russian annexation in 1804.

=== Ghazni ===
- Musa Jan Khan of Ghazni, Emir of Ghazni 1879–1880, deposed or abdicated 1880.

=== Greece ===
- Otto, King of Greece, deposed 1862.

=== Guria ===
- Vakhtang III Gurieli, Prince of Guria, deposed 1803.
- David Gurieli, Prince of Guria, deposed 1829.

=== Gutenzell Abbey ===
- Justina von Erolzheim, Princess-Abbess of Gutenzell 1776–1803, deposed through the annexation by Württemberg 1803, died 1809.

=== Gottschee ===
- Wilhelm I of Gottschee, reigned 1800–1809 and 1815–1822, lost his domain to Austria-Hungary, restored 1815, died 1822.

=== Gowa ===
- Karaeng Pangkajena Paduka Sri Sultan 'Abdu'l Khalik ibnu Sultan Zain ud-din, Sultan of Gowa, deposed 1814.
- La Oddanriwu Karaeng Katangka Paduka Sri Sultan 'Abdu'l Rahman ibnu Sultan 'Abdu'l Rauf, Sultan of Gowa, installed and deposed 1825, died 1845.

== H ==
=== Haiti ===
- Faustin I, Emperor of Haiti, deposed 1859.

=== Kingdom of Hanover ===
- George V, King of Hanover, deposed 1866, died 1878.

=== Kingdom of Hawaii ===
- Liliuokalani, Queen of the Hawaiian Islands, deposed 1893.

=== Emirate of Harar ===
- `Abd Allah II ibn `Ali `Abd ash-Shakur, usurper, seized the throne 1884 (or 1885). Deposed by Emperor Menelik II in 1887.

=== Monastic State of the Knights Hospitaller, Heitersheim ===
- Ignaz Balthasar Willibald Rink von Baldenstein, Prince-General Prior of Heitersheim 1796–1806, deposed through the annexation by Baden.

=== Herford Abbey ===
- Friedrike Charlotte Leopoldine Luise Prinzessin von Brandenburg-Schwedt, Princess-Abbess of Herford 1764–1802, deposed through the annexation by Prussia, died 1808.

=== Electorate of Hesse ===
- Wilhelm IX of Hesse-Kassel, Landgrave of Hesse-Kassel 1785–1803, then Elector and Sovereign Landgrave of Hesse-Kassel 1803–1807, deposed 1807, restored 1813, died 1821.
- Friedrich Wilhelm I of Hesse Kassel, Elector and Sovereign Landgrave of Hesse-Kassel 1847–1866, deposed 1866, died 1875.

=== Prince-Bishopric of Hildesheim ===
- Franz Egon von Fürstenberg, Prince-Bishop of Hildesheim 1789–1802, deposed through the annexation by Prussia.

=== Hohengeroldseck ===
- Philipp Franz Wilhelm Ignaz Peter, Count of Hohengeroldseck 1775–1806, promoted to Prince 1806, deposed 1814, died 1829.

=== Hohenlohe-Langenburg ===
- Karl Ludwig of Hohenlohe-Langenburg 1789–1806, deposed through the annexation by Baden 1806.

=== Hohenlohe-Ingelfingen ===
- Friedrich Ludwig zu Hohenlohe-Ingelfingen, Prince of Hohenlohe-Ingelfingen 1796–1806, deposed through the annexation by Bavaria 1806.

=== Hohenlohe-Bartenstein ===
- Ludwig Aloys Joachim of Hohenlohe-Bartenstein, Prince of Hohenlohe-Bartenstein, deposed through the annexation by Bavaria 1806.
- Karl Joseph of Hohenlohe-Bartenstein, Prince of Hohenlohe-Bartenstein (in Jagstberg) 1798–1806, deposed through the annexation by Bavaria 1806.
- Eduard of Hohenlohe-Bartenstein, Prince of Hohenlohe-Bartenstein (in Bartenstein), deposed through the annexation by Bavaria 1806.

=== Hohenlohe-Waldenburg-Schillingsfürst ===
- Karl Albrecht III Philipp Josef, Prince of Hohenlohe-Waldenburg-Schillingsfürst 1796–1806, deposed through the annexation by Bavaria 1806.

=== Hohenzollern-Hechingen ===
- Friedrich Wilhelm of Hohenzollern-Hechingen, Prince of Hohenzollern-Hechingen 1838–1850, abdicated 1850, died 1869.

=== Hohenzollern-Sigmaringen ===
- Karl of Hohenzollern-Sigmaringen, Prince of Hohenzollern-Sigmaringen (Fürst von Hohenzollern zu Sigmaringen) 1831–1848, deposed or abdicated 1848, died 1853.
- Karl Anton of Hohenzollern-Sigmaringen, Prince of Hohenzollern-Sigmaringen (Fürst von Hohenzollern zu Sigmaringen) 1848–1850, abdicated 1850, died 1885.

=== Holy Roman Empire ===
- Francis II, Holy Roman Emperor, abdicated 1806.

=== Holland ===
- Louis I, King of Holland 1806–1810, deposed 1810.
- Louis II, King of Holland 1810, deposed 1810 when Holland was annexed by France.

=== Hsamönghkam ===
- Maung Shwe E, Myosa of Hsamönghkam 1825–1834, deposed or abdicated 1834, restored 18xx, reigned until 1847.
- Maung Me, Myosa of Hsamönghkam 1834–18xx, deposed or abdicated 18xx, restored 1847, reigned until 1848.
- Maung Lin, Myosa of Hsamönghkam 1867, deposed or abdicated 1867, restored 1876, reigned until 18xx.
- Maung Shwe Min, Myosa of Hsamönghkam 1848–1867, deposed or abdicated 1867, restored 1885, reigned until 1886.

=== Hsenwi ===
- Sao Hseng Naw Hpa, Saopha of Hsenwi 1845–1848, deposed or abdicated 1848restored 1853, deposed or abdicated 1855, restored 1867, deposed or abdicated 1869, restored 1874, deposed or abdicated 1875, restored 1876, reigned until 1879.
- Sao Hpa Mawng Hpa, Saopha of Hsenwi 1858–1860, deposed or abdicated 1860, restored 1863, deposed or abdicated 1864.

=== Huahine ===
- King Ari'i-mate Te-uru-ra'i of Huahine, deposed 1868.
- Queen Te-mari'i-a-Teurura'i Ma'i-hara Te-uhe of Huahine, deposed and fled to Tahiti, 1890.
- Queen Teri'i-na-vaha-roa Teri'ita-ri'a Teha'apapa III of Huahine, deposed on the annexion of Huahine by France, September 1895.

=== Kingdom of Hungary ===
- King Ferdinand V, abdicated 1848.
- King Francis Joseph I, deposed 1849, restored later that year.

== I ==
=== County of Isenburg ===
- Ernst Kasimir III, Count of Isenburg 1801–1810, deposed by the French occupation 1810.

=== Isenburg-Birstein ===
- Karl I Friedrich Ludwig Moritz, Prince of Isenburg-Birstein 1803–1816, deposed 1816, died 1820.

=== Isenburg-Meerholz ===
- Karl Ludwig Wilhelm, Count of Isenburg-Meerholz, deposed or abdicated 1806.

=== Isenburg-Wächtersbach ===
- Ludwig Maximilian II, Count of Isenburg-Wächtersbach 1805–1806, deposed 1806.

=== Itsandra ===
- Musa Fumu wa Fey Fumu Sultan of Itsandra 4 times in the 19th century.
- Tibe Bamba, Sultan of Itsandra 4 times in the 19th century.

=== Imereti ===
- King Solomon II, deposed after his kingdom was annexed by Russia on 20 February 1810.

=== Italy ===
- King Umberto I, killed in 1900.

== J ==
=== Jelebu ===
- Dato' Mahmud alias Kulup Tunggal, 9th Dato' Mendika Mentri Akhir ul-Zaman and 11th Dato' Penghulu of Jelebu.

== K ==
=== Kaisersheim Abbey ===
- Franz Xaver Müller, Prince-Abbot of Kaiserheim 1783–1803, deposed through the annexation by Bavaria.

=== Khanate of Kalat ===
- Khudadad Khan (ruler), Khan of Kalat, dethroned in 1893.

=== Käppel ===
- Marianne Antonia von Donop, Princess-Abbess of Käppel, deposed through the annexation by Nassau in 1803.

=== Kingdom of Kartli-Kakheti ===
- King Giorgi XII, deposed 1800.

=== Karangasem ===
- Sri Paduka Ratu Gusti Gedé Ngurah Agung Langang Paguyangan, Raja of Karangasem, deposed 1828.
- Sri Paduka Ratu Gusti Ngurah Bagus Pañji Karangasem, Raja of Karangasem, deposed 1838.

=== Kasanzi ===
- Mbumba of Kasanzi, Yaka of Kasanzi ?-1848, deposed or abdicated 1848, restored 1853 and reigned until ?

=== Kazembe ===
- Kazembe IX Lukwesa Mpanga, Mwata Kazembe of Kazembe 1872–1883, deposed or abdicated 1883, restored 1885, deposed, abdicated or died 1886.
- Kazembe X Kanyembo Ntemena, Mwata Kazembe of Kazembe 1883–1885, deposed of abdicated 1885, restored 1886, died 1904.

=== Imperial Ducal Abbey of Kempten ===
- Castolus Reichlin von Meldegg-Amtezell, Prince-Abbot of Kempten 1793–1803, deposed through the annexation of Kempten by Bavaria.

=== Knyphausen ===
- Wilhelm II Gustav Friedrich, Baron of Knyphausen, deposed or abdicated 1810, restored 1813, re-deposed 1813, restored 1818.
- Wilhelm III Friedrich Christian Graf von Aldenburg, Baron of Knyphausen, deposed or abdicated 1854.

=== Cologne ===
- Anton Victor Joseph Johann Raimund Erzherzog von Österreich, Archduke of Cologne, deposed 1801, died 1835.

=== Kyawkku Hsiwan ===
- Nga Shwe Maung I, Ngwegunhmu of Kyawkku Hsiwan 1844–1852, deposed or abdicated 1852, restored 1856, reigned until 1863.

== L ==
=== Laihka ===
- Sao Hkam Mawng, Saopha of Laikha 1860–1862, deposed or abdicated 1862, restored 1868, reigned until 1879.

=== Lawksawk ===
- Sao Waing, Saopha of Lawksawk 1854–1881, deposed or abdicated 1881, restored 1886, reigned until January 1887.

=== Lindau Abbey ===
- Karl August Fürst von Bretzenheim, Count of Lindau 1803–1804, deposed 1804.

=== Loilong ===
- Hkun Pu, Ngwegunhmu of Loilong 1856–1880, deposed or abdicated 1880, died 1882.

=== Loimaw ===
- Maung Shwe Pyi, Ngwegunhmu of Loimaw, deposed 1874, restored 1886.

=== Lombardo-Veneto ===
- Ferdinand I, abdicated 1848.
- Franz Joseph I, lost Lombardy in 1859 and Venetia in 1866.

=== Lozi ===
- Mubukwanu, Litunga of the Lozi ?-18th century, deposed in the 18th century.

=== Lübeck ===
- Peter Friedrich Ludwig Herzog von Holstein-Gottorp, Archbishop (1785–1803) and Prince (1803–1806) of Lübeck, deposed or abdicated 1806, died 1829.

== M ==
=== Kingdom of Madagascar ===
- Radama II, King of Madagascar, murdered in 1863.
- Ranavalona III, Queen of Madagascar, deposed by the French 1897.

=== Archbishopric of Mainz ===
- Carl Theodor Reichsfreiherr von Dalberg, Archbishop of Mainz 1802–1806, deposed or abdicated 1806, died 1817.

=== Sultanate of the Maldives ===
- Sultan Muhammad Mu'in ud-din II, installed 1886, deposed 1888.
- Sultan Ibrahim Nur ud-din II, installed 1882, deposed 1886, reinstated 1888.
- Sultan Muhammad 'Imad ud-din V, installed 1892, deposed 1893.
- Sultan Muhammad Shams ud-din III Iskander, deposed 1893, reinstated 1903, re-deposed 1934.

=== Mangareva ===
- Bernardo Putairi, deposed 1881.

=== Manyika ===
- Cikanga Nyarumwe II, Mambo of Manyika 1796–1807, deposed or abdicated 1807 restored 1818, reigned until 1822–

=== Mayotte ===
- Andriantsoly of Mayotte, Sultan of Mayotte 1832–1833, deposed 1833, restored 1836, redeposed 1841, died 1845.

=== Mergentheim ===
- Karl II Ludwig Johann Erzherzog von Österreich, Prince-Grand Master of Mergentheim (Fürst und Hoch-und Deutschmeister des Deutschen Ordens in deutschen und wälschen Landen, Administratoren des Hochmeistertums in Preussen, Herrn zu Freudenthal und Eulenberg) 1801–1804, deposed or abdicated 1804, died 1847.
- Anton Viktor Joseph Raymund Erzherzog von Österreich, Prince-Grand master of Mergentheim (Fürst und Hoch-und Deutschmeister des Deutschen Ordens in deutschen und wälschen Landen, Administratoren des Hochmeistertums in Preussen, Herrn zu Freudenthal und Eulenberg) 1804–1809, deposed or abdicated 1809, died 1835.

=== Mexico ===
- Agustín de Iturbide, Emperor of Mexico, deposed 1823.
- Maximilian I of Mexico, Emperor of Mexico, deposed in 1867.

=== Mingrelia ===
- Grigol VI Dadiani, Duke of Mingrelia, deposed 1802, reinstated 1802.
- Levanti V Dadiani, Duke of Mingrelia, abdicated 1840.
- Nikolaoz, Duke of Mingrelia, abdicated 1867.

=== Duchy of Modena ===
- Francis IV, Duke of Modena, deposed 1831, restored later that year
- Francis V, Duke of Modena, deposed 1848, restored 1849, deposed again 1859. The duchy was annexed by the Kingdom of Sardinia in 1860.

=== Mughal Empire ===
- Bahadur Shah II, deposed 1858, dynasty prevails through Prince Mirza Nali

=== Mosquito Nation ===
- George Augustus Frederic II, last King of the Miskito Kingdom, deposed 1860.
- Andrew Hendy, Hereditary Chief of Mosquitos, abdicated 1889.
- Robert Henry Clarence, Hereditary Chief of Mosquitos, deposed 12 February 1894.

=== Mukhrani ===
- Constantine IV, deposed on the annexation of his principality by the Russian Empire, 1801.

=== Mwali ===
- 1842–67 and 1871–78 Sultan Jumbe Fatima bint Abderremane, Sultani of Mwali 1842–1867 and 1871–1878.

== N ==
=== Naning Kingdom ===
- Dol Said, deposed 1831

=== Kingdom of Naples ===
- Ferdinand IV, deposed 1806, restored 1815.
- Joseph Bonaparte, abdicated 1808.
- Joachim Murat, deposed 1815.

=== Duchy of Nassau ===
- Adolf, Duke of Nassau, deposed 1866.

=== Nassau-Orange-Fulda ===
- Prince Willem Frederik, Prince of Orange-Nassau, lost his territories in 1806.

=== Sultanate of Ndzuwani ===
- Abdallah II bin Alawi, Sultan of Ndzuwani 1816–1832, deposed or abdicated 1832, restored 1833, died 1836.
- Saidi Alawi bin Abdallah, Sultan of Ndzuwani 1836–1837, deposed or abdicated 1837.

=== Neu-Leiningen ===
- Ferdinand Karl III Wilhelm Leopold, Count of Neu-Leiningen 1798–1801, deposed or abdicated 1801, died 1813.

=== Negeri Sembilan ===
- Paduka Sri Tuanku Raja Laboh, Yang di-Pertuan Besar of Negri Sembilan 1826–1831, deposed 1831.

=== Kingdom of the Netherlands ===
- Willem I, King of the Netherlands, abdicated 1840.

=== Niu'atuputapu ===
- Uiliame Latumailangi, 7th Ma'atu of Niu'atuputapu, ceded the island of Niu'atuputapu to King George Tupou I on 4 June 1862, when Niu'atuputapu became an integral part of the Kingdom of Tonga.

=== Norway ===
- Frederick VI, King of Norway, deposed 1814.
- Christian Frederick, King of Norway, abdicated 1814.

== O ==
=== Prince-Bishopric of Osnabrück ===
- Prince Frederick, Duke of York, Prince-Bishop of Osnabrück 1764–1802, deposed as a result of the German Mediatisation, territory was mediated to Hanover.

=== Ottoman Empire ===
- Selim III, deposed 1807.
- Mustafa IV, executed 1808.
- Abdulaziz, deposed 1876.
- Murad V, deposed 1876.

=== Olbrück ===
- Maximilian Friedrich of Olbrück, Baron of Olbrück, deposed following the annexation of Olbrück by France in 1801.

=== Oman ===
- Salim bin Sultan, Sultan of Muscat and Oman, deposed by his brother in 1806.
- Salim bin Thuwaini, Sultan of Muscat and Oman, deposed in 1868.

=== Oran ===
- Mustafa Bey al-Manzalah, Wāli of Oran 1802–1805, deposed or abdicated 1805, restored 1807, died 1807.

== P ==
=== Prince-Bishopric of Paderborn ===
- Franz Egon von Fürstenberg, Prince-Bishop of Paderborn 1789–1802, deposed by the annexation by Prussia.

=== Papal States ===
- Pope Pius VII, deposed as ruler of the Papal States 1809, restored 1814
- Pope Pius IX, deposed as ruler of the Papal States 1870.

=== Duchy of Parma ===
- Charles II, Duke of Parma, deposed 1848, restored later that year, abdicated 1849.
- Robert I, deposed 1859, his duchy annexed by the Kingdom of Sardinia in 1860.

=== Prince-Bishopric of Passau ===
- Leopold Leonhard Raimund II von Thun, Prince-Bishop of Passau 1796–1803, deposed following Passau's annexation by Salzburg.

=== Portugal ===
- Pedro IV, King of Portugal, abdicated 1826.
- Maria II, Queen of Portugal, deposed 1828, restored 1834.
- Miguel I, King of Portugal, deposed 1834.

== Q ==
=== Quba Khanate ===
- Husayn II Khan, Satyaq Khan of Quba, deposed following the annexation of Quba by Russia in 1816.

=== Quedlinburg Abbey ===
- Sophie Albertine of Sweden, Princess-abbess of Quedlinburg 1787–1803, deposed or abdicated 1803, died 1808.

=== Qusantine ===
- Ahmed Bey Ben Abdullah el-Memlouk, Bey of Qusantine, deposed 1818, restored 1820.
- Ahmed Bey ben Mohamed Chérif, Bey of Qusantine, deposed 1848.

== R ==
=== Rai'atea ===
- Tamatoa V, King of Ra'iatea and Taha'a, deposed on 1871.
- Tamatoa VI, King of Ra'iatea and Taha'a, deposed by the annexation of Ra'iatea and Taha'a by France, 16 March 1888.

=== Reuss-Schleiz ===
- Heinrich XLII, Count of Reuss-Schleiz 1784–1802, deposed or abdicated 1802, died 1818.

=== Reuss-Lobenstein ===
- Heinrich LXXII, Count of Reuss-Lobenstein, abdicated 1848, died 1853.

=== Romania ===
- Alexandru Ioan Cuza, Domnitor of Romania 1862–1866, deposed 1866.

=== Russian Empire ===
- Paul I, assassinated in 1801.
- Alexander II, assassinated in 1881.

=== Ryukyu Kingdom ===
- Sho Tai, deposed upon abolition of the kingdom in 1879, died 1901.

== S ==
=== Kingdom of Sardinia ===
- Charles Emmanuel IV, abdicated 1802, died 1819.
- Victor Emmanuel I, abdicated 1821, died 1824.
- Charles Albert, abdicated 1849, died later that year.

=== Saxe-Altenburg ===
- Joseph, Duke of Saxe-Altenburg, abdicated 1848, died 1868.

=== Saxe-Meiningen ===
- Bernhard II, Duke of Saxe-Meiningen, abdicated 1866, died 1882.

=== Serbia ===
- Miloš Obrenović I, Prince of Serbia, deposed 1839, restored 1858.
- Mihailo Obrenović III, Prince of Serbia, deposed 1842, restored 1860.
- Alexander Karađorđević, Prince of Serbia, deposed 1858.
- Milan I Obrenović, Prince and then King of Serbia, abdicated 1889.

=== Shaki Khanate ===
- Mustafa Salim Khan, Bashchi of Shakki 1795–1806, deposed or abdicated 1806, died 1819.
- Isma`il Khan of Shakki, Bashchi of Shakki 1815–1819, deposed through the annexation by Russia.

=== Shewa ===
- Haile Melekot, Prince of Shewa, deposed 1859.
- Seyfe Sahle Selassie, Prince of Shewa, seized the throne 1859, deposed 1859, restored 1860.
- Menelik II, Emperor of Ethiopia, King of Shewa 1855–1856, deposed 1856, restored 1865 as king, terminated the separate state 1889 and annexing it to Ethiopia, where he ascended as emperor.

=== Spain ===
- Charles IV, deposed 1808, briefly restored later that year before abdicating, died 1819.
- Ferdinand VII, deposed or abdicated 1808, restored 1813, died 1833.
- Joseph Bonaparte, deposed 1813.
- Isabella II, deposed 1868.
- Amadeo I, abdicated 1873.

=== Sri Lanka ===
- Sri Wikrama Rajasinghe, last King of the Kingdom of Kandy, deposed by the British in 1816. Deported to South India together will all claimants to the throne to extinguish the national royal line. Kept as a prisoner for 17 years where he died at the Vellor Fort at age 52.

=== Sungai Ujong ===
- Dato' Muhammad Yusuf bin Hashim, 13th Undang of Luak of Sungai Ujong 1881–1889, deposed 1889.

=== Sudan ===
- `Abd Allah of Sudan, Khalifa of Sudan, deposed 1898.

=== Svaneti ===
- Constantine Dadeshkeliani, revolted against Russian rule, deposed 11 September 1857.

=== Sweden ===
- Gustav IV Adolf, King of Sweden, deposed 1809.

== T ==
=== Tahiti ===
- Pōmare V, King of Tahiti 1877–1880, ceded Tahiti to France on 29 June 1880.

=== Emirate of Trarza ===
- `Umar Salum wuld `Umar, Emir of Trarza 1886–1891, deposed or abdicated 1891.

=== Principality of Trinidad ===
- James Harden-Hickey, self-proclaimed Prince of Trinidad 1893–1895, deposed by British and then Brazilian occupation.

=== Tulsipur ===
- "Chauhan," Raja Drig Narayan Singh of House of Tulsipur deposed following the 1857 Mutiny.

=== Grand Duchy of Tuscany ===
- Ferdinand III, Grand Duke of Tuscany, deposed 1801, restored 1814
- Charles Louis, King of Etruria, deposed 1807.
- Leopold II, Grand Duke of Tuscany, deposed 1849, restored later that year, abdicated 1859.
- Ferdinand IV, Grand Duke of Tuscany, deposed 1859 when his Grand Duchy was annexed to the Kingdom of Sardinia in 1860.

=== Kingdom of the Two Sicilies ===
- Francis II, deposed 1860/1861.

== V ==
=== Viet Nam ===
- Cảnh Thịnh, Emperor of the Tây Sơn dynasty, overthrown and executed in 1802.
- Dục Đức, Emperor of the Nguyễn dynasty, deposed and imprisoned in 1883.
- Hiệp Hòa, Emperor of the Nguyễn dynasty, deposed and killed in 1883.
- Hàm Nghi, Emperor of the Nguyễn dynasty, captured and forced into exile in 1888.
- Thành Thái, Emperor of the Nguyễn dynasty, deposed and forced into exile in 1907.
- Duy Tân, Emperor of the Nguyễn dynasty, deposed and forced into exile in 1916.

== W ==
=== Wassulu ===
- Samori ibn Lafiya Ture, Fama of Wassulu 1870–1884, Almami of Wassulu 1884–1898. Deposed 29 September 1898.

=== Prince-Bishopric of Worms ===
- Karl Theodor von Dalberg, Prince-Bishop of Worms 1802–1803, deposed following the annexation by Hesse-Darmstadt, died 1817.

== Z ==
=== Sultanate of Zanzibar ===
- Khalid bin Barghash of Zanzibar, Sultan of Zanzibar, deposed 1896.

=== Zemio ===
- Zangabirou, ruler of Zemio ? -ca. 1855, died ca. 1858.

== See also ==
- List of monarchs who abdicated
- List of monarchs who lost their thrones in the 18th century
- List of monarchs who lost their thrones in the 17th century
- List of monarchs who lost their thrones in the 16th century
- List of monarchs who lost their thrones in the 15th century
- List of monarchs who lost their thrones in the 14th century
- List of monarchs who lost their thrones in the 13th century
- List of monarchs who lost their thrones before the 13th century
