= List of monarchs who lost their thrones in the 16th century =

This is a list of monarchs who lost their thrones in the 16th century. This list currently holds 27 countries.

== Austria ==
- Charles V, Holy Roman Emperor, the title of Archduke of Austria passed over to Ferdinand I, Holy Roman Emperor in 1521.

== Aztec Empire ==
- Cuauhtémoc, the last independent Emperor of the Aztecs, deposed by Spain in 1521, died 1525.
- Luis Nanacacipactzin was the last dynastic-lined ruler (under Spanish occupation) up to his death in 1565.

== Badakhshan ==
- Humayun (Mughal Emperor of India 1530–1539 and 1555–1556), ruler of Badakhshan 1520–1529, deposed or abdicated 1529, died 1556.

== Egypt ==
- Al-Mutawakkil III, Abbasid Caliph of Cairo, deposed 1516, restored 1517.

== Cambodia ==
- Brhat Pada Samdach Sdach Brhat Rajankariya Brhat Mahindra Rajadhiraja Ramadipati Sri Suriya Varman Maha Chakrapati Varman Naranga Ridhi Sanditya Isvara Kambul Krung Kambuja Adipati Sri Sudhara Pawara Indrapada Gururatta Rajadhaniya Tissarana Naya Mahayana Jathi Brhat Paramanatha Parama Bupati Jaya Amachas Mahindaraja of Cambodia, King of Cambodia, deposed 1594.

== Castile ==
- Ferdinand II of Aragon, King of Castile with Isabella I. Castile passed over to Joanna I and Philip of Burgundy in 1504.

== Carinthia ==
- Charles V, Holy Roman Emperor, Duke of Carinthia 1519–1521, title passed over to Ferdinand I, Holy Roman Emperor.

== Carniola ==
- Charles V, Holy Roman Emperor, Duke of Carniola. Title passed to Ferdinand I, Holy Roman Emperor, in 1521.

== Ecatepec ==
- Diego Huanitzin, Tlatoani of Ecatepec. Following Spanish colonization in 1539, Huanitzin became the first Governor of the region.

== Guelders ==
- Wilhelm, Duke of Jülich-Cleves-Berg, Duke of Guelders 1539-1543. Guelders then passed to Charles V, Holy Roman Emperor.

== Holy Roman Empire ==
- Charles V, Holy Roman Emperor, abdicated 1556.

== Kashmir ==
- Muhammad Shah, King of Kashmir 1484, 1493-1505, 1514-1515, 1516-1528 and 1530-1537. Died 1537.
- Fath Shah, King of Kashmir 1486-1493, 1505-1514 and 1515-1516. Died 1516.
- Nazuk Shah, King of Kashmir 1529-1530 and 1540-1552. Deposed or abdicated 1530, restored 1540 and died 1552.
- Yousuf Shah, King of Kashmir 1579 and 1580-1586. Deposed 1579, but restored 1580. Died 1586.
- Yakub Shah, King of Kashmir 1586. Deposed 1586, died 1588.

== Kelantan ==
- Raja Umar bin Raja Ahmad, Raja of Kelantan, abdicated 1570.

== León ==
- Ferdinand II of Aragon, King of León with Isabella I. León was passed to Joanna I and Philip of Burgundy in 1504.

== Lugano ==
- Lodovico Sforza, 1484–1501, died 1508.

== Malacca ==
- Paduka Sri Sultan Mahmud Shah I ibni al-Marhum Sultan 'Ala ud-din Ri'ayat Shah Shah, Sultan of Malacca and Johor 1488–1528, deposed 1528, died 1530.

== Mecca ==
- Barakat II bin Muhammad, Amir and Sharif of Mecca 1497–1525, expelled by his brother.

== Naples ==
- Frederick IV, King of Naples, deposed 1501.

== Persia ==
- Mohammad Khodabanda, Safavid Shah of Persia (Iran), deposed 1587.

== Portugal ==
- António I, King of Portugal, deposed after a short war with Philip II of Spain, from then on also Philip I of Portugal.

== Saluzzo ==
- Giovanni Ludovico of Saluzzo, Marquess of Saluzzo, deposed 1529.

== Scotland ==
- Mary, Queen of Scots, deposed 1567.

== Styria ==
- Charles V, Holy Roman Emperor, 1521. The title Duke of Styria passed to Ferdinand I, Holy Roman Emperor.

== Sweden ==
- John II, King of Sweden, deposed 1501.
- Eric XIV, King, deposed 1568.
- Sigismund, King of Poland and Sweden, deposed in Sweden 1599.

== Timurid dynasty ==
- Badi' al-Zaman, ruler of the Timurid dynasty (in Herat), deposed 1507.

== Tlacopan ==
- Tetlepanquetzal, King of Tlacopan, deposed by the Spanish in 1521. Died 1525.

== Tulsipur ==
- Chauhan Raja Dev Narayan Singh, ceased to be king of the House of Tulsipur, 1575.

== Tyrol ==
- Charles V, Holy Roman Emperor 1519-1521, Count of Tyrol, title passed over to Ferdinand I, Holy Roman Emperor.

== Zapotec ==
- Cocijopi Xolo, King of the Zapotec 1529-1530s, died 1563.

== Zutphen ==
- Wilhelm, Duke of Jülich-Cleves-Berg, ceased to be Duke of Zutphen in 1543 when authority over Zutphen was passed to Charles V, Holy Roman Emperor.

== See also ==
- List of monarchs who abdicated
- List of monarchs who lost their thrones in the 19th century
- List of monarchs who lost their thrones in the 18th century
- List of monarchs who lost their thrones in the 17th century
- List of monarchs who lost their thrones in the 15th century
- List of monarchs who lost their thrones in the 14th century
- List of monarchs who lost their thrones in the 13th century
- List of monarchs who lost their thrones before the 13th century
