= List of monarchs who lost their thrones in the 14th century =

This is a list of monarchs who lost their thrones in the 14th century.

== Achaea ==
- Philip I of Taranto, Prince of Achaea. Ceded Achaea to Matilda of Hainaut in 1313. Died 1331.
- Matilda of Hainaut, Princess of Achaea. Deposed by John, Duke of Durazzo in 1318. Died 1331.
- John, Duke of Durazzo, Prince of Achaea. Ceded Achaea to Robert of Taranto in 1332.
- Philip II of Taranto, Prince of Achaea. Deposed 1373. Died 1374.
- Joan I of Naples, Princess of Achaea. Deposed 1381. Died 1382.

== Albania ==
- Robert of Taranto, King of Albania 1332, title passed over to John of Gravina as the "Duke of Durazzo".

== Austria ==
- Leopold III, Duke of Austria, Duke of Austria between 1365 and 1379, lost Austria to Albert III.

== Bosnia ==
- Tvrtko I of Bosnia, Ban of Bosnia, deposed 1366, reinstated 1367.

== Bulgaria ==
- Chaka, Emperor of Bulgaria 1299 to 1300, deposed and strangled in prison 1300.
- Ivan Stephen, Emperor of Bulgaria 1330 to 1331, deposed, died in exile after 1343.

== Byzantine Empire ==
- Andronicus II Palaeologus, abdicated 1328.
- John V Palaeologus, deposed 1347, restored 1355, redeposed 1376, restored 1379, redeposed once more 1390, restored later that year.
- John VI Cantacuzenus, deposed 1354.
- Andronicus IV Palaeologus, deposed 1379.
- John VII Palaeologus, deposed 1390.

== Cambodia ==
- Brhat Pada Samdach Sdach Rajankariya Brhat Sidhanta Rajadhiraja Ramadipati, King of Cambodia, abdicated 1346.

== Castile ==
- Pedro of Castile, King of Castile, deposed 1366, restored 1367.
- Henry of Trastamara, King of Castile, deposed 1367, restored 1369.

== Carinthia ==
- Albert III, Duke of Austria, Duke of Carinthia (with Leopold III), lost Carinthia to Leopold in 1379.

== Cephalonia ==
- John II Orsini, Count of Cephalonia 1323-1324, deposed by John of Gravina.

== Chagatai Khanate ==
- Eljigidey, deposed 1329.
- Kebek, deposed 1310, restored 1318.

== Clermont-en-Beauvaisis ==
- Louis I, Duke of Bourbon, exchanged the County of Clermont-en-Beauvaisis for that of La Marche in 1327.

== Denmark ==
- Christopher II of Denmark, deposed 1326; returned 1329.
- Valdemar III of Denmark, deposed 1329.

== Egypt ==
- an-Nasir Nasir-ad-Din Muhammad, Mameluke sultan of Egypt 1293-1295, 1299-1309 and 1309-1340.
- an-Nasir Nasir-ad-Din al-Hasan, Mameluke sultan of Egypt 1347-1351 and 1354-1361
- as-Salih Salah-ad-Din Hajji I, Mameluke sultan of Egypt 1382 and 1389.
- Barquq, Mameluke sultan of Egypt 1382–1389 and 1390–1399, died 1399.

== England ==
- Edward II, King of England, abdicated 1327.
- Richard II, King of England, deposed 1399.

== Epirus ==
- Nikephoros II Orsini Despot of Epirus 1335-1338 and 1356-1359, died 1359.

== Hungary ==
- Mary of Hungary "Queen-Regnant" of Hungary 1382–1385 and 1386–1395, died 1395.

== Ilkhanate ==
- Musa (Ilkhanid dynasty) Ilkhan 1336, deposed and fled.

== Imereti ==
- Bagrat I of Imereti, King of Imereti, deposed 1330.

== Japan ==
=== Emperors ===
- Emperor Go-Fushimi Emperor of Japan 1298-1301, abdicated 1301, died 1336 .
- Emperor Hanazono Emperor of Japan 1308-1318, abdicated 1314, died 1348 .

==== South Court ====
- Emperor Chōkei South Emperor of Japan 1368-1383, died 1394.
- Emperor Go-Kameyama South Emperor of Japan 1383-1392, died 1424 .

==== North Court ====
- Emperor Kōgon North Emperor of Japan 1331-1333, deposed 1333, died 1364 .
- Emperor Kōmyō North Emperor of Japan 1336-1348, abdicated 1348, died 1380 .
- Emperor Sukō North Emperor of Japan 1348-1351, abdicated 1351, died 1398 .
- Emperor Go-Kōgon North Emperor of Japan 1352-1371, died 1374.
- Emperor Go-En'yū North Emperor of Japan 1371-1382, died 1393 .

== Majorca ==
- James III of Majorca, King of Majorca, deposed 1344, died 1349.

== Moldavia ==
- Bâlc of Moldavia Voivode of Moldavia 1359, deposed, died 1395.

== Naples ==
- Joanna I, Queen of Naples, deposed 1382.
- Ladislaus, King of Naples, deposed 1389, restored 1399.
- Louis II, King of Naples, deposed 1399.

== Poznań ==
- Wladislaw IV the Short Prince of Poznań 1296-1300 and 1314-1333, died 1333
- Václav II. Prince of Poznań 1300-1302, died 1305
- Przemyslaw II of Glogów, Prince of Poznań 1309-1312, died 1331.
- Henry IV the True (of Zagan), Prince of Poznań 1309-1312, died 1342
- John of Scinawa Prince of Poznań 1309-1312, died 1361/5
- Bolesław of Oleśnica Prince of Poznań 1309-1312, died 1322
- Conrad of Namyslów Prince of Poznań 1309-1312, died 1366

== Ponthieu ==
- James I, Count of La Marche Count of Ponthieu from 1351 to 1360, died 1362 .

== Saluzzo ==
- Manfred V of Saluzzo, marquess of Saluzzo, forced to cede the throne in 1334, usurped throne in 1341, deposed and imprisoned, 1342.

== Serbia ==
- Stephen Uroš III Dečanski, King of Serbia 1321-1331, overthrown and murdered 1331.

== Styria ==
- Albert III, Duke of Austria, Duke of Styria (with Leopold) 1365-1379, lost Styria to Leopold III.

== Sweden ==
- Birger, deposed in 1318
- Håkan, deposed in 1364
- Magnus IV, deposed in 1364
- Albert, deposed in 1389

== Tyrol ==
- Albert III, Duke of Austria, Count of Tyrol (with Leopold III) 1365-1379, lost Tyrol to Leopold.

== Turkey ==
- Sultan Murad I was killed in battle in 1389.

== White Horde ==
- Tokhtamysh Khan of the White Horde 1378–1380, title integrated into the Golden Horde.

== Zahumlje ==
- Nikola Altomanović, ruler of Zahumlje, deposed and blinded, 1873.

== Zurichgau ==
- John II of Zurichgau, ruler of Zurichgau 1337-1351, died 1380

== See also ==
- List of monarchs who abdicated
- List of monarchs who lost their thrones in the 19th century
- List of monarchs who lost their thrones in the 18th century
- List of monarchs who lost their thrones in the 17th century
- List of monarchs who lost their thrones in the 16th century
- List of monarchs who lost their thrones in the 15th century
- List of monarchs who lost their thrones in the 13th century
- List of monarchs who lost their thrones before the 13th century
