= List of monarchs who lost their thrones in the 15th century =

This is a List of monarchs who lost their thrones in the 15th century.

== Artois ==
- Maximilian I, Holy Roman Emperor, Count of Artois 1477–1482, forced to cede Artois to Joanna of Castile.

== Brabant ==
- Maximilian I, Holy Roman Emperor, Duke of Brabant 1477–1482, forced to cede Brabant to Joanna of Castile.

== Brandenburg ==
- Frederick I, Elector of Brandenburg, Margrave of Brandenburg, forced to cede Brandenburg to John, Margrave of Brandenburg-Kulmbach in 1426.

== Bulgaria ==
- Constantine II of Bulgaria, Tsar of Bulgaria, died in exile 1422.

== Burgundy ==
- Maximilian I, Holy Roman Emperor, Duke of Burgundy 1477–1482, forced to cede Burgundy to Joanna of Castile.

== Byzantine Empire ==
- Constantine XI Palaiologos, Roman emperor of Constantinople 1449–1453, killed in the capture of the city.
- Demetrios Palaiologos and his brother Thomas Palaiologos, despots of Morea. In 1460 the Ottoman sultan Mehmed II invaded Morea.
- David Komnenos ruler of Trepizond, surrendered to Mehmed II in 1461.

== Cambodia ==
- Brhat Pada Samdach Sdach Brhat Rajankariya Padma Khattiya Varodhama Parama Maharajadhiraja Ramadhipati Brhat Sri Suriyabarnaya Padma Kshatra Sadhitya Isvara Kambul Katumukha Mangala Maha Negara Bhnam Tun Ben Paramaraja II, King of Cambodia, abdicated 1463.
- Brhat Pada Samdach Sdach Brhat Rajankariya Brhat Sri Suryadaya Rajadhiraja, King of Cambodia, captured by Siamese troops in 1474.

== Chan Chan ==
- Minchancaman, ?-1476, deposed by Inca conquest.

== Clermont-en-Beauvaisis ==
- Louis II, Duke of Bourbon, Count of Clermont-en-Beauvaisis, deposed 1400, died 1410.
- John I, Duke of Bourbon, Count of Clermont-en-Beauvaisis, captured at the Battle of Agincourt in 1415 and imprisoned in London.

== Crimean Khanate ==
- Hacı I Giray Khan of Crimea 1449–1456 and 1456–1466.
- Hayder of Crimea Khan of Crimea 1456, died 1487.
- Nur Devlet Khan of Crimea 1466–1467,1467–1469 and 1475–1476.
- Meñli I Giray Khan of Crimea 1466, 1469–1475 and 1478–1515.

== Egypt ==
- Al-Nasir Nasir-ad-Din Faraj, Sultan of Mamluk Sultanate of Egypt & Syria 1399-1405 and 1405–1411.
- Al-Musta'in Billah, Cairo-based caliph (1406–1414) and Mamluk Sultanate (1412). Lost the sultanate in 1412, and the caliphate in 1414.

== England ==
- Henry VI, King of England, deposed 1461, reinstated 1470, deposed again 1471.
- Edward IV, King of England, deposed 1470, reinstated 1471.
- Edward V, King of England, deposed 1483.

== Flanders ==
- Maximilian I, Holy Roman Emperor, Count of Flanders 1477–1482, forced to cede Flanders to Joanna of Castile.

== Golden Horde ==
- Tokhtamysh Khan of the Golden Horde 1380–1395, died 1406.
- Olug Moxammat of Kazan Khan of the Golden Horde 1419-1422/23 and 1428–1433.

== Guelders ==
- Arnold, Duke of Gelderland, Duke of Guelders 1423-1465 and 1471–1473, passed Guelders over to Adolf of Geulders 1465, regained Guelders 1471 and died 1473.
- Maximilian I, Holy Roman Emperor, Duke of Guelders 1477–1482, handed Guelders over to Elisabeth of Brunswick.
- Philip I of Castile, Duke of Guelders 1482–1492, Guelders then passed to Charles of Egmond.

== Hainaut ==
- Maximilian I, Holy Roman Emperor, Count of Hainaut 1477–1482, forced to cede Hainaut to Joanna of Castile.

== Holland ==
- Maximilian I, Holy Roman Emperor, Count of Holland 1477–1482, forced to cede Holland to Joanna of Castile.

== Holy Roman Empire ==
- Wenceslaus, King of the Romans, deposed 1400.

== Kashmir ==
- Muhammad Shah, King of Kashmir 1484,1493–1505,1514–1515,1516–1528 and 1530–1537. Died 1537.
- Fath Shah, King of Kashmir 1486–1493, 1505–1514 and 1515–1516. Died 1516.

== Kazan ==
- Ilham Ghali of Kazan Khan of Kazan 1479-1484 and 1485–1487.
- Moxammat Amin of Kazan Khan of Kazan 1484–1485, 1487–1495, and 1502–1518.
- Mamuq of Kazan Khan of Kazan 1495–1496, died 1499.

== Kelantan-Majapahit ==
- Paduka Sri Sultan Iskander Shah Nenggiri ibni al-Marhum Sultan Baki Shah Raja of Kelantan-Majapahit 1429 - 1467, deposed by the Siamese 1467.

== Limburg ==
- Maximilian I, Holy Roman Emperor, Duke of Limburg 1477–1482, forced to cede Limburg to Joanna of Castile.

== l'Isle-Jourdain ==
- John I, Duke of Bourbon, Count of l'Isle-Jourdain. Captured at the Battle of Agincourt in 1421.

== Lothier ==
- Maximilian I, Holy Roman Emperor, Duke of Lothier 1477–1482, forced to cede Lothier to Joanna of Castile.

== Lugano ==
- Ugo of Lugano 1464-1467 and 1475–1479, died after 1475

== Luxembourg ==
- Maximilian I, Holy Roman Emperor, Duke of Luxembourg 1477–1482, forced to cede Luxembourg to Joanna of Castile.

== Malacca ==
- Paduka Sri Sultan Ibrahim 'Abu Shahid Shah ibni al-Marhum Sultan Muhammad Shah Sultan of Malacca 1444, deposed by his brother 1444.

== Mogulistan ==
- Uwais Khan ibn Sher 'Ali, Ruler of Mogulistan 1418-1421 and 1425–1429. Deposed or abdicated 1421, restored 1425, died 1429.

== Moldavia ==
- Iuga of Moldavia Voivode of Moldavia 1374-1377 and 1399–1400.
- Iliaş of Moldavia Voivode of Moldavia 1432-1433 and 1435–1443.
- Petru Aron Voivode of Moldavia 1451–1452, 1454–1455, and 1455–1457.

== Namur ==
- Maximilian I, Holy Roman Emperor, Count of Namur 1477–1482, forced to cede Namur to Joanna of Castile.

== Naples ==
- René I, King of Naples, deposed 1442.
- Alfonso II, King of Naples, deposed 1495.
- Charles VIII of France, King of Naples, deposed 1495 or 1496.

== Nuremberg ==
- Frederick I, Elector of Brandenburg, Burgrave of Nuremberg. Title abolished in 1427.

== Pahang ==
- Paduka Sri Sultan 'Abdu'l Jalil Shah ibni al-Marhum Sultan Muhammad Shah Sultan of Pahang 1475, abdicated, died 1511.
- Paduka Sri Sultan Ahmad Shah I ibni al-Marhum Sultan Mansur Shah Sultan of Pahang 1475 - 1497, abdicated 1497, died 1512.
- Paduka Sri Sultan Mansur Shah I ibni al-Marhum Sultan 'Abdu'l Jalil Shah Sultan of Pahang 1475 and 1497–1519, deposed 1475, restored 1497, died 1519.

== Sweden ==
- Eric the Pomeranian, deposed in 1434 and again in 1439
- Christian I, deposed in 1464
- Charles II, deposed in 1457 and again in 1465, reinstated in 1467

== Tibet ==
- Kunga Lekpa of Phagmo Dru, deposed in 1481.
- Tshokye Dorje, regent of the Rinpung 1491–1499, deposed or abdicated 1499, died 1510.

== Timurid dynasty ==
- Khalil Sultan (Timurid dynasty) Timurid ruler 1405 to 1409, deposed, died 1411.
- Ibrahim (Timurid Dynasty) ruler of the Timurid Dynasty (in Herat) until 1458, died ca. 1459.

== Tulsipur ==
- Chauhan Raja Udat Singh ceased to be King of House of Tulsipur in 1485.

== Tyrol ==
- Sigismund, Archduke of Austria, Count of Tyrol 1446–1490, forced to hand Tyrol over to Maximilian I, Holy Roman Emperor .

== Wallachia ==
- Dan II of Wallachia Prince of Wallachia 1420 to 1421, 1421 to 1423, 1423 to 1424, 1426 to 1427, and 1427 and 1431.
- Radu II of Wallachia Prince of Wallachia August 1420 – 1422, 1423, 1424 and 1427.
- Mircea II of Wallachia Prince of Wallachia 1442, deposed, died 1447.
- Vladislav II of Wallachia Prince of Wallachia from 1447 to 1448 and 1448 to 1456.
- Vlad III the Impaler Prince of Wallachia 1448, 1456–62, and 1476.
- Radu cel Frumos Prince of Wallachia 1462–1473, 1473–1474, 1474 and 1474–1475.
- Basarab Laiotă cel Bătrân Prince of Wallachia 1473, 1474, 1474, 1475 and 1476, 1476 and 1477.
- Basarab Ţepeluş cel Tânăr Prince of Wallachia 1477-1481 and 1481–1482.
- Vlad Călugărul Prince of Wallachia 1481 and 1482–1495.

== Zeeland ==
- Maximilian I, Holy Roman Emperor, Count of Zeeland 1477–1482, forced to cede Zeeland to Joanna of Castile.

== Zeta ==
- Đurađ IV Crnojević Lord of Zeta/Montenegro 1490–1496, deposed from Zeta by the Turks.

== Zutphen ==
- Maximilian I, Holy Roman Emperor, Count of Zutphen 1477–1482, forced to cede Zutphen to Joanna of Castile.

== See also ==
- List of monarchs who abdicated
- List of monarchs who lost their thrones in the 19th century
- List of monarchs who lost their thrones in the 18th century
- List of monarchs who lost their thrones in the 17th century
- List of monarchs who lost their thrones in the 16th century
- List of monarchs who lost their thrones in the 14th century
- List of monarchs who lost their thrones in the 13th century
- List of monarchs who lost their thrones before the 13th century
