= List of non-sovereign monarchs who lost their thrones =

Many non-sovereign monarchs either lost their thrones through deposition by a coup d'état, by a referendum which abolished their throne, or chose to abdicate during the 20th century.

German royalty was abolished in the aftermath of World War I.

== A ==
=== Abuja ===
- Malam Awwal Ibrahim, emir of Abuja (in Nigeria), deposed or abdicated 1994, restored 2000.

=== Aceh Darussalam ===
- Sultan Kehalarat Deelat Nyang Meuha Meulia Paduka Seri Baginda Sultan Berdaulat Zilulahil Filalam Alaudin Muhammad Daud Shah, known as Sultan Muhammad Daud Shah, of Aceh in Indonesia surrendered to the Netherlands following the arrest of the Queen and Queen Mother in 1903.

=== Agaie ===
- Muhammad Nkochi Attahiru, emir of Agaie, deposed 1994, restored 2001.

== B ==
=== Baroda State ===
- Farzand-i-Khas-i-Daulat-i-Inglishia, Shrimant Maharaja Sir Pratapsinhrao Gaekwad, Sena Khas Khel Shamsher Bahadur, Maharaja of Baroda, deposed 1951.

=== Bharatpur State ===
- Maharaja Shri Brijendra Sawai Brijendra Singhji Bahadur Bahadur Jang, Maharaja of Bharatpur was deposed in 1971.

=== Bhopal State ===
- Sikander Saulat, Iftikhar ul-Mulk, Nawab Sultan Kaikhusrau Jahan Begum Sahiba, Nawab Begum of Bhopal, abdicated in 1926.

=== Bone state ===
- La Pawowoni Karaeng Segeri Arumpone of Bone was deposed in 1905.
- Haji Andi La Mappanjuki Karaeng Silayar Sri Sultan Ibrahim ibnu Sultan Husain Arumpone of Bone abdicated 1946, was restored 1950, and reigned again until 1960.
- Andi Pabenteng Arumpone of Bone was deposed in 1950.

=== Buffalo Point ===
- Warren Thunder, chief of Buffalo Point, deposed 1969, died 1973.

=== Bugabula ===
- William Wilberforce Kadhumbula Nadiope III, Omukama of Bugabula, deposed by the Ugandan government in 1967, died 1973

=== Buganda ===
- Major-General H.H. Edward Frederick William David Walugembe Mutebi Luwangula Mutesa II Kabaka of Buganda was deposed by the abolition of the Ugandan kingdoms on September 8, 1967 while he was exiled in London from 1966 until his death in 1969.

=== Buhweju ===
- Ndagara, Omukama of Buhweju, deposed 1901.

=== Buleleng ===
- Sri Ratu Anak Agung g Nyoman Panji Tisna Raja of Buleleng abdicated 1947 and was reinstalled in 1950.
- Sri Ratu Anak Agung Panji Sakti II Raja of Buleleng abdicated in 1950.

=== Emirate of Bukhara ===
- Emir Mohammed Alim Khan was deposed in 1920 when his lands were taken over by Bolsheviks.

=== Busoga ===
- William Wilberforce Kadhumbula Nadiope III, Isebantu Kyabazinga of Busoga, deposed by the Ugandan Government in 1967.

== C ==
=== Caliphate ===
- Caliph Abdul Mejid II, cousin of the last Ottoman Sultan Mehmed VI, was deposed in 1924.

=== Principality of Champasak ===
- Bua Laphan Ratsadany, prince of Champasak 1900–1904, was deposed when the principality was abolished on November 22, 1904.

=== Chisasibi ===
- Violet Pachanos, chief of Chisabibi 1989–1995, deposed or abdicated 1995, restored 1999, reigned until 2001.

=== Kingdom of Cochin ===
- Sir Sri Rajarshi Rama Varma, Maharaja of Cochin, abdicated his throne in 1914 owing to ill-health and differences with the British Empire.
- Rama Varma Parikshith Thampuran, Maharaja of Cochin, signed the instrument of accession to the Dominion of India thus ending the executive political role. Cochin was merged with Travancore to form Travancore-Cochin Union from 1 July 1949.

== D ==
=== Dewas State ===
- Kshatriya Kulavatana Sena Sapta Sahasri Senapati Pratinidhi, Meherban Shrimant Maharaja Sir Vikramsinhrao Tukojirao (Nana Sahib) Puar, Maharaja of Dewas, abdicated in 1947.

== G ==
=== Gojjam ===
- Negus Tekle Haymanot Tessema of Gojjam, died in 1901 and his kingdom was divided and incorporated into the Empire of Ethiopia.

=== Gowa ===
- Andi Ijo Daeng Mattawang Karaeng Lalolang Paduka Sri Sultan Muhammad 'Abdu'l Kadir Aid ud-din ibnu Sultan Muhammad Tahir Muhib ud-din, Sultan of Gowa, was deposed by the Indonesian republic in 1960.

== H ==
=== Kingdom of Hejaz ===
- King Ali of Hejaz, deposed by Saudi military forces in 1925.

== I ==
=== Igara ===
- Musinga, Omukama of Igara, deposed 1901.

== J ==
=== Jimma ===
- The last King of Jimma, Abba Jifar II, died and, on 12 May 1932, the Kingdom of Jimma was incorporated into the Empire of Ethiopia.

== K ==
=== Khanate of Khiva ===
- Khan Abdallah Khan was deposed 1920; his lands were taken over by Bolsheviks.

=== Kokang ===
- Yang Guo Zhen Hkun Lu Kwan, Heng of Kokang—1919.
- Sao Edward Yang Kyein Tsai, Saopha of Kokang, deposed by Burma, 1959.

=== Kubu ===
Rulers of the Kubu Sultanate:

- Sharif 'Abbas ibni al-Marhum Sharif Hasan 'Ali al-Idrus, Yang di-Pertuan Besar of Kubu, was deposed in 1911.
- Sharif Muhammad Zainal Idrus ibni al-Marhum Sharif Ismail al-Idrus, Tuan Besar of Kubu, abdicated in 1921.
- Sharif Salih ibni al-Marhum Idrus al-Idrus, Tuan Besar of Kubu, was deposed by the Japanese in 1943.
- Sharif Hasan ibni al-Marhum Sharif Muhammad Zainal Idrus al-Idrus, Tuan Besar of Kubu, was deposed by the Indonesian republic.

=== Kupang ===
- Raja Don Ote Nicolaas Isu Nisnoni, Raja of Kupang, abdicated in 1945.
- Raja Don Obe Alfonsus Nisnoni, Raja of Kupang, was deposed by the Indonesian republic in 1960.

=== Kutai ===
- Sri Paduka Sultan Aji Muhammad Parikesit al-Adil Khalifat ul-Muminin, Sultan of Kutai Karta Negara, was deposed by the Indonesian government in 1960.

=== Kwena tribe ===
- Sebele II was chief of the Kwena tribe until he was exiled by the British colonial administration and replaced with his brother Kgari Sechele II.

== L ==
=== Lamjung and Kaski ===
- Sri Sri Sri Maharaja Juddha Shamsher Jang Bahadur Rana, Maharaja of Lamjung and Kaski 1932–1945, abdicated on November 29, 1945.
- Sri Sri Sri Maharaja Padma Shamsher Jang Bahadur Rana, Maharaja of Lamjung and Kaski 1945–1948, abdicated in 1948.
- Sri Sri Sri Maharaja Mohan Shamsher Jung Bahadur Rana, Maharaja of Lamjung and Kaski 1948–1951, was deprived of all the hereditary offices and privileges conferred on Jung Bahadur in 1857 on February 18, 1951.

=== Lingga ===
- Paduka Sri Sultan 'Abdu'l-Rahman II Mu'azzam Shah ibni al-Marhum Raja Muhammad Yusuf al-Mahdi, Sultan and Yang di-Pertuan Besar of Lingga, Riau, was deposed in absentia in 1911.

=== Lo ===
- See under Mustang

== M ==
=== Emirate of Mecca ===
- Sherif Hussein ibn Ali, was the Sherif of Mecca, and Emir of Mecca from 1908 until 1917. He was deposed by Ibn Saud in 1924.

=== Mohammerah ===
- Shaikh Khaz'al Khan ibn Haji Jabir Khan Sardar-i-Aqdas, Shaikh of Mohammerah 1897-1924. Deposed 1924 by Reza Shah, died 1936.

=== Mustang ===
- King Jigme Dorje Palbar Bista of Mustang (or Lo) was deposed in 2008, along with all the other Nepalese monarchs.

== Q ==
=== Qu'aiti ===
- Ghalib II al-Qu' aiti, Sultan of Qu'aiti Shihr and Mukalla, deposed in 1967

== R ==
=== Rimatara ===
- Tamaeva V, Queen of Rimatara, deposed 1901.

=== Rujumbura ===
- Makobore, Omukama of Rujumbura, deposed 1901.

=== Rurutu ===
- Epatiana Teuruari'i IV, King of Rurutu, deposed 1900.

== S ==
=== Kingdom of Sarawak ===
- Sir Charles Vyner Brooke, White Rajah of Sarawak, abdicated on July 1, 1946.

=== Serdang ===
- Paduka Sri Sultan Tuanku Sulaiman Sharif ul-'Alam Shah ibni al-Marhum Sultan Bashar un-din [Al-Marhum Perbaungan], Sultan and Yang di-Pertuan Besar of Serdang, was deposed in 1946.

=== Sintang ===
- Sri Paduka Tuanku Haji Gusti Adi 'Abdu'l-Majid ibni al-Marhum Panembahan Ismail, Panembahan Kusuma Negara III, Panembahan of Sintang, deposed by Netherlands East Indies authorities in 1913.

== T ==
=== Kingdom of Toro ===
- Rukirabasaija Patrick David Matthew Koboyo Olimi III was deposed by the abolition of the Ugandan kingdoms on September 8, 1967.

=== Kingdom of Travancore ===
- Maharaja Raja Ramaraja Sri Patmanabha Dasa Vanchi Pala Bala Rama Varma II (Sri Chithira Tirunal), Kulasekhara Kiritapati Manney Sultan Bahadur, Shamsher Jang, Maharaja of Travancore, signed the instrument of accession to the Dominion of India, 15 August 1947, ending the executive political role of his monarchy. Merged his state with Cochin and served as Rajpramukh of the Travancore-Cochin Union from 1 July 1949 until 31 October 1956. Deprived of his princely rank, titles and honours by the republican federal government of India on 28 December 1971.

== U ==
=== Unyanyembe ===
- Chief Fundikira III, Ntemi of Unyanyembe, deposed by Tanzania in 1962.

== V ==
=== Vallabhpur State ===
- HRH Sarmad i Raja-e-Hindustan, Mirza Raja, Padma Murasa, Sata Vigraha Samrat, Maharaja Dhiraj, Maharana Sir Sawai Jagdish Singh Kachwaha of Vallabpur. The state merged into the Dominion of India in 1947. Deprived of his princely rank, titles and honours by the republican federal government of India on 28 December 1971.

== W ==
=== Wajo ===
- Haji Andi Mangkona Datu Marioriwawo, Aru Matowa of Wajo, abdicated 1949.

== See also ==
- Abolished monarchy
- List of current monarchs
