= List of monarchs who lost their thrones in the 17th century =

This is a list of monarchs who either lost their thrones through deposition by a coup d'état, by a referendum which abolished their throne, or chose to abdicate in the 17th century.

== Aceh Darussalam ==
- Baginda Seri Sultana Zinatudin Kemalat Shah, deposed in 1699 by her husband, Sayid Umar (later Sultan Badrul Alam) with support of the Grand Mufti from Mecca.

== Beaumont ==
- Henry IV of France, Duke of Beaumont; Beaumont was merged into the Crown of France in 1607.

== Bohemia ==
- Rudolf II, King of Bohemia, deposed 1611.
- Ferdinand II, King of Bohemia, deposed 1619, restored 1620.
- Frederick, King of Bohemia, deposed 1620.

== Cambodia ==
- Brhat Sri Saravajna Samdach Naranatha Brhat Pada Samdach Sdach Brhat Rajankariya Brhat Paramaraja Ramadipati Brhat Sri Suriyabarna Dharmika Rajadhiraja Parama Chakrapatra Mahadhiptindra Narindra Rattanakasa Upasajati Mahisvara Akka Maha Parasratna Vivadhanadiraksha Ekkaraja Maha Madhankula Kumbul Krung Kambuja Adipati Maha Puriratna Sanditya Mukutya Bumindra Indipati Gururatta Raja Mandisala Mahasthana Brhat Paramanatha Parama Bupatiya Amachas Jivitha Ludhibana Paramaraja VII, King of Cambodia, (referred to as Paramaraja VII) abdicated 1618.

== Diois ==
- Henry IV of France, Count of Diois (1589–1601); Diois was merged into the Crown of France.

== England ==
- Charles I, King of England, lost the English Civil War and executed in 1649.
- James II, King of England, considered to have ceased to reign from December 1688, officially deposed February 1689 in the Glorious Revolution.

== Halvad ==
- Shri Shaktimant Jhaladipati Mahamandleshwar Maharana Sriraj Jaswantsinhji I Gajsinhji Sahib Bahadur, Maharana Raj Sahib of Halvad, expelled 1673, restored 1683.

== Hungary ==
- Rudolf II, King of Hungary, deposed 1609.

== Ireland ==
- James II, King of Ireland, deposed 1689, made effective 1690.

== Jembal ==
- Raja Sakti I ibni al-Marhum Sultan 'Abdu'l Kadir, Raja of Kelantan-Utara (Jembal) and Kelantan-Patani, Raja of Jembal (1632–1649)
- Tuan Putri Sa'adong binti Raja Loyor Putri Vijaya Mala, Raja of Jembal (1663–1667).

== Johor ==
- Paduka Sri Sultan 'Ala' ud-din Ri'ayat Shah III Zillu'llahi fil-Alam ibni Paduka Sri Sultan Ali Jalla 'Abdu'l Jalil Shah, Sultan of Johor (1597–1614, 1615).

== Macedonia ==
- Karposh, Duke of Kumanovo and King of Macedonia, killed by the Ottoman Empire, 1689.

== Mecca ==
- Sharif Idris II, Sharif of Mecca, abdicated 1610.
- Sharif Muhsin I bin Husain, Sharif of Mecca, deposed 1628.
- Sharif Ahmad bin Talib al-Hasan, Sharif of Mecca, deposed 1629.
- Sharif 'Abdu'llah I bin Hasan, Sharif of Mecca, abdicated 1631.
- Sharif Hamud bin 'Abdu'llah bin Hasan I, Grand Sharif of Mecca, deposed 1670.
- Sharif 'Abu'l Barakat III, Grand Sharif of Mecca, deposed 1682.
- Sharif Ibrahim bin Muhammad, Grand Sharif of Mecca, deposed 1684.
- Sharif Ahmad bin Zeid, Grand Sharif of Mecca, deposed 1671, reinstated 1684.
- Sharif Ahmad bin Ghalib, Grand Sharif of Mecca, deposed 1690.
- Sharif Muhsin bin Ahmad, Grand Sharif of Mecca, deposed 1668, restored 1689, re-deposed 1690.
- Sharif 'Abdu'llah II bin Hashim, Grand Sharif of Mecca, deposed 1694.
- Sharif Sa'ad Pasha, Grand Sharif of Mecca, deposed 1672, restored 1693, re-deposed 1694, restored 1694, re-deposed 1702.

== Prince-Bishopric of Minden ==
- Christian von Brunswick-Lüneburg, Prince-Bishop of Minden, deposed or abdicated 1625, died 1633.
- Franz Wilhelm von Wartenberg, Prince-Bishop of Minden, deposed 1648.

== Moghulistan ==
- Ismail Khan, Khan of Moghulistan 1669, 1670–1678, and 1679–1682.

== Ottoman Empire ==
- Sultan Mustafa I, Sultan of the Ottoman Empire 1617–1618, 1622–1623.
- Sultan Mehmed IV, Sultan of the Ottoman Empire 1648–1687.

== Pahang ==
- Paduka Sri Sultan 'Ala' ud-din Ri'ayat Shah ibni al-Marhum Sultan 'Abdu'l Ghaffar Muhi ud-din Shah, Sultan of Pahang (1614–1615).
- Paduka Sri Sultan 'Abdu'l Jalil Shah III ibni al-Marhum Sultan 'Ala' ud-din Ri'ayat Shah III, Sultan of Johor, Pahang and Lingga (1615–1617, 1623

== Palatinate ==
- Frederick V, Elector Palatine, deposed 1623.

== Palmares ==
- Ganga Zumba, Mocambo of Palmares, deposed and re-enslaved in 1680.
- Zumbi, Mocambo of Palmares, deposed in 1694 and subsequently captured and beheaded.

== Perak ==
- Maulana Paduka Sri Sultan Mansur Shah II ibni al-Marhum Raja Kechil Lasa, Sultan of Perak (1619–1627)

== Polish-Lithuanian Commonwealth ==
- John II Casimir Vasa, King of Poland and Grand Duke of Lithuania, abdicated 1668.

== Portugal ==
- Philip III, King of Portugal, deposed 1640.
- Afonso VI, King of Portugal, partially deposed 1667, although still considered as king until his death.

== Russia ==
- Feodor II, Tsar of Russia, deposed 1605.
- Vasili IV, Tsar of Russia, deposed 1610.

== Scotland ==
- Charles I, King of Scotland, lost the English Civil War and executed in 1649.
- Charles II, King of Scotland, deposed 1651, restored 1660.
- James VII, King of Scotland, considered to have ceased to reign from December 1688, officially deposed February 1689 in the Glorious Revolution.

== Sweden ==
- Christina, Queen of Sweden, abdicated 1654.

== Taiwan ==
- Zheng Keshuang, King of Tungning/Taiwan (Kingdom of Formosa/Kingdom of Tungning), surrendered to the Qing Manchu's aggression in 1683.

== Tulsipur ==
- Chauhan Raja Ram Krishna Singh ceased to be king of Tulsipur in 1675.

== Trubczewsk ==
- Aleksy Trubczewski, Prince of Trubczewsk, deposed 1645.

== See also ==
- List of monarchs who abdicated
- List of monarchs who lost their thrones in the 19th century
- List of monarchs who lost their thrones in the 18th century
- List of monarchs who lost their thrones in the 16th century
- List of monarchs who lost their thrones in the 15th century
- List of monarchs who lost their thrones in the 14th century
- List of monarchs who lost their thrones in the 13th century
- List of monarchs who lost their thrones before the 13th century
