= List of people educated at Millfield =

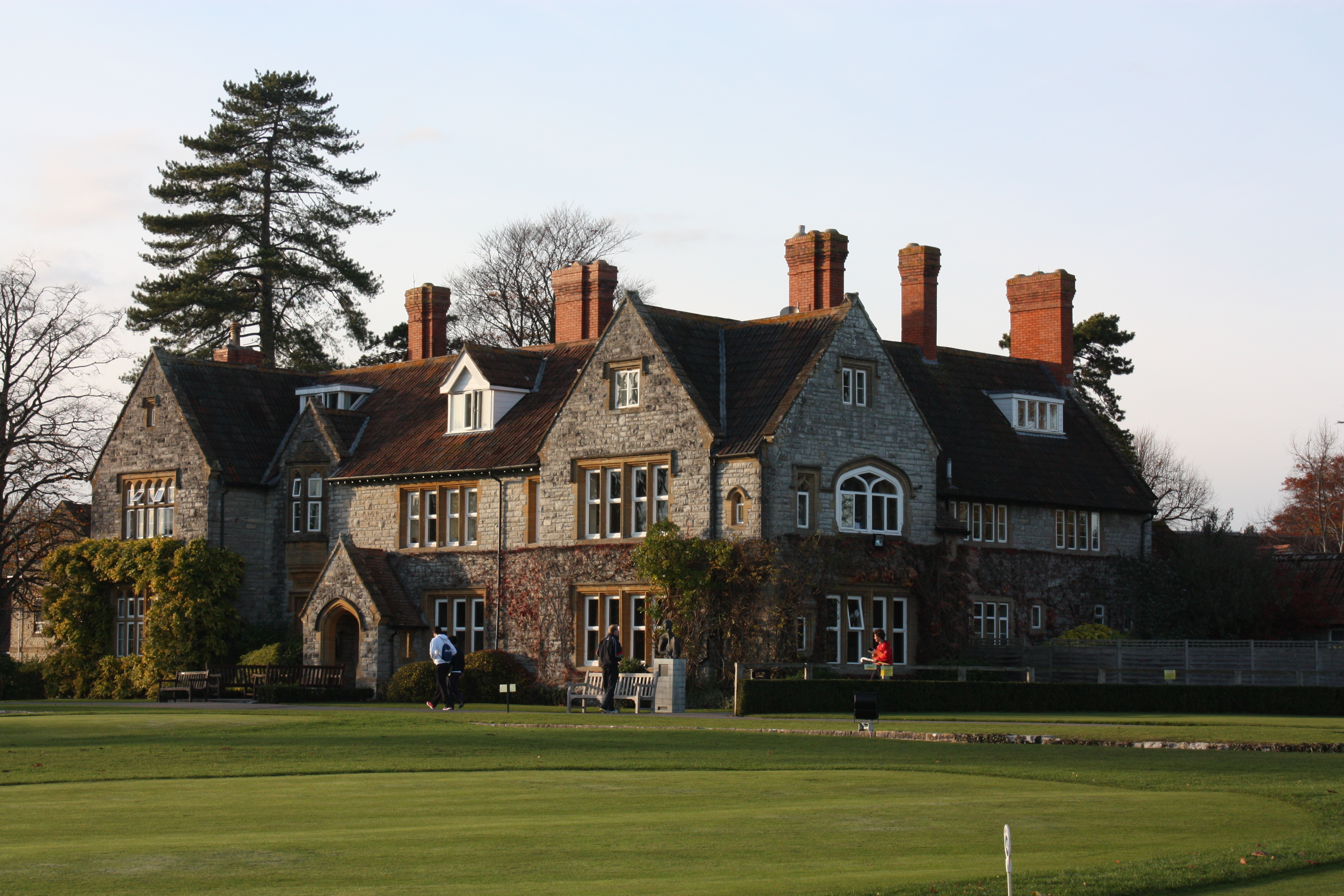
Millfield House

Founded in 1935, Millfield is a co-educational Independent school for pupils aged 13–18 years based in Street, Somerset, England.

Millfield is a registered charity and is the largest co-educational boarding school in the UK with approximately 1,240 pupils, of whom over 950 are full boarders of over 65 nationalities. Millfield Development and the Millfield Foundation, raises money to fund scholarships and bursaries. The school is a member of the G20 Schools Group and a member of the Headmasters' and Headmistresses' Conference. The Millfield campus is based over 240 acres in Somerset, in Street, in the South West of England.

Former pupils of Millfield school in Somerset are known as Old Millfieldians or OMs. Colloquially they are known by the pejorative "Miffies."

== Notable OMs ==
=== A ===
- Adwoa Aboah (born 1992), fashion model and actress
- Kesewa Aboah (born 1994), visual artist and model
- Kasey Aldridge (born 2000), cricketer
- Alexander, Crown Prince of Yugoslavia (born 1945), member of Yugoslav royal family
- Tom Alexander (born 1959), businessman
- Anthony Allen (born 1986), rugby union player
- Lily Allen (born 1985), singer-songwriter and actress
- Prince Asem bin Al Nayef (born 1948), member of Jordanian royal family
- Sheikh Sultan bin Zayed bin Sultan Al Nahyan (1955–2019), deputy prime minister of the United Arab Emirates
- His Royal Highness Ghalib II al-Qu'aiti (born 1948), sultan of Qu'aiti
- Henry Ashton (born 1991), actor
- Damian Aspinall (born 1960), businessman and conservationist
- Darren Atkins (born 1997), rugby union player
- Joanne Atkinson (born 1959), swimmer
- Jon Atkinson (1969–2025), cricketer
- Pip Atkinson (born 1964), rugby union player
- Sefi Atta (born 1963), author and playwright
- Martin Attlee, 2nd Earl Attlee (1927–1991), politician
- Anselm Audley (born 1982), author

=== B ===
- Paul Bail (1965–2024), cricketer
- James Bailey (born 1983), rugby union player
- Lucy Bailey (born 1962), theatre director
- Kostas Bakoyannis (born 1978), politician
- Ian Balding (1938–2026), racehorse trainer
- Brian Barnes (1945–2019), golfer
- Jenny Barraclough (born 1937), film and television producer
- Kevin Barrett (born 1975), cricketer
- Joey Barrington (born 1980), squash player
- George Bartlett (born 1998), cricketer
- Stephen Batchelor (born 1961), field hockey player
- Gerald Battrick (1947–1998), tennis player
- Josh Bayliss (born 1997), rugby union player
- Simon Beck (born 1958), artist
- Cruz Beckham (born 2005), singer and musician
- Romeo Beckham (born 2002), model and footballer
- John Lane Bell (born 1945), mathematician and philosopher
- Lauren Bell (born 1999), cyclist
- Daniel Bell-Drummond (born 1993), cricketer
- Jon Bentley (born 1961), journalist and television presenter
- Tom Bertram (born 1977), field hockey player
- Tom Bevan (born 1999), cricketer
- Salem Bin Laden (1946–1988), investor and billionaire businessman
- Kieran Bird (born 1999), swimmer
- Sam Bird (born 1987), racing driver
- Richard Birkett (born 1979), rugby union player
- Tony Blackburn (born 1943), radio disc jockey
- John Brake (born 1988), rugby union player
- Tom Brock (born 1994), cricketer
- Alan Brooke, 3rd Viscount Brookeborough (born 1952), nobleman and landowner
- Nick Brothers (born 1983), field hockey player
- Michael Brougham, 5th Baron Brougham and Vaux (1938–2023), nobleman and member of the House of Lords
- Philippa Browning (born 1960), astrophysicist
- Suki Brownsdon (born 1965), swimmer
- Oli Burrows (born 2002), rugby union player
- Rob Bruniges (1956–2023), fencer
- Graham Burgess (born 1943), cricketer
- Alex Burghart (born 1977), politician
- Sir Charles Burrell, 10th Baronet (born 1962), conservationist
- Charles R. Burton (1942–2002), explorer

=== C ===
- Annie Campbell-Orde (born 1995), rower
- Lewis Capes (born 1971), shot put athlete and American football player
- Richard Caring (born 1948), businessman
- Andrew Castle (born 1963), tennis player and broadcaster
- Daniel Catán (1949–2011), composer
- Julian Cayo-Evans (1937–1995), political activist and leader of the Free Wales Army
- Victor Chandler (born 1951), businessman and bookmaker
- Dominic Chappell (born 1966), businessman and racing driver
- Rupert Christiansen (born 1954), writer and journalist
- Scott Clayton (born 1994), tennis player
- Oscar Coggins (born 1999), triathlon athlete
- Ian Collins (born 1962), swimmer
- Judy Congdon (born 1948), tennis player
- Jason Connery (born 1963), actor and director
- Chris Cook (born 1991), rugby union player
- Pamela Cookey (born 1984), netball player
- Alec Coombes (born 1995), rugby union player
- Stewart Copeland (born 1952), musician and composer
- Dean Cosker (born 1978), cricketer
- Thompson Cowan (born 2002), rugby union player
- Mark Cox (born 1943), tennis player
- Peter Creed (born 1987), squash player
- Brad Currie (born 1998), cricketer

=== D ===
- Sophie Dahl (born 1977), author and fashion model
- Euan Dale (born 1985), swimmer
- Thomas Dann (1981–2021), cricketer
- Ieuan Davies (born 2004), rugby union player
- Rhys Davies (born 1998), rugby union player
- Max Denmark (born 1999), rugby union player
- Peter Denning (1949–2007), cricketer
- Julie Dibens (born 1975), triathlete
- James Disney-May (born 1992), swimmer
- Ciaran Donoghue (born 2003), rugby union player
- Dominic Dromgoole (born 1963), theatre director and writer
- Ben Duckett (born 1994), cricketer
- Bob Dudley-Jones (born 1952), cricketer
- John Dunn (born 1940), political theorist
- Chutima Durongdej (born 1985), model and Miss Thailand Universe winner
- Wes Durston (born 1980), cricketer
- Ted Dwane (born 1984), musician and member of Mumford and Sons

=== E ===
- Joseph Eckland (born 2004), cricketer
- Gareth Edwards (born 1947), rugby union player
- Jeremy Edwards (born 1971), actor
- Marwan El Shorbagy (born 1993), squash player
- Mohamed El Shorbagy (born 1991), squash player
- Jago Eliot (1966–2006), surfer and visual artist
- Tom Ellis (born 1994), rugby union player
- Ella Eyre (born 1994), singer-songwriter
- Ioan Emanuel (born 2005), rugby union player
- Steffan Emanuel (born 2006), rugby union player
- Ben Evans (born 1986), golfer

=== F ===
- Caleb Falconer (born 2006), cricketer
- Rotimi Fani-Kayode (1955–1989), photographer and artist
- Joanna Fargus (born 1982), swimmer
- Matthew Featherstone (born 1970), cricketer
- John Feaver (born 1952), tennis player
- Lord John FitzGerald (1952–2015), Army officer and racehorse trainer
- Timothy Fok (born 1946), businessman and sports administrator
- Caroline Foot (born 1965), swimmer
- Gareth Forwood (1945–2007), actor
- Mark Foster (born 1970), swimmer
- Cemlyn Foulkes (1949–2014), field hockey player
- Helen Fox (born 1962), children's author
- William Franklyn-Miller (born 2004), actor

=== G ===
- Ruth George (born 1969), politician
- Roger Gibbs (1934–2018), financier and philanthropist
- Rory Gibbs (born 1994), rower
- Josh Gillespie (born 2000), rugby union player
- Jeremy Gilley (born 1969), actor and filmmaker
- Victoria Glendinning (born 1937), writer and broadcaster
- Helen Glover (born 1986), rower
- Charles Godfray (born 1958), zoologist
- Benjamin Goethe (born 2003), racing driver
- Oliver Goethe (born 2004), racing driver
- Jon Golding (born 1982), rugby union player
- Edward Goldsmith (1928–2009), environmentalist and writer
- James Goldsmith (1933–1997), financier and politician
- Lewis Goldsworthy (born 2001), cricketer
- Kaveh Golestan (1950–2003), photojournalist and artist
- Duncan Goodhew (born 1957), swimmer
- Helen Gouldby (born 1968), swimmer
- David Graveney (born 1953), cricketer and cricket selector
- Malcolm Gregson (1943–2024), golfer
- Antony Grey (1927–2010), LGBT rights activist
- James Guy (born 1995), swimmer

=== H ===
- Calum Haggett (born 1990), cricketer
- Rory Hamilton-Brown (born 1987), cricketer
- George Hankins (born 1997), cricketer
- Richard Harding (born 1953), rugby union player
- Neil Harper (born 1965), swimmer
- Will Harries (born 1987), rugby union player
- Sam Harris (born 2003), rugby union player
- Charlie Hartley (born 1994), cricketer
- Adam Hastings (born 1996), rugby union player
- Erica Hawley (born 1998), triathlon athlete
- Michael Hayman (born 1970), entrepreneur and author
- Jess Hazell (born 2004), cricketer
- David Heath (born 1954), politician and optometrist
- Christopher Hellings (born 1980), cricketer
- Sarah Helm (born 1956), journalist and writer
- David Hemp (born 1970), cricketer
- James Hewitt (born 1958), army officer
- Suzanna Hext (born 1988), swimmer and equestrian
- Richard Hickmet (1947–2024), politician and barrister
- James Hildreth (born 1984), cricketer
- Rob Hill (born 1967), field hockey player
- Prince Abbas Hilmi (born 1941), Egyptian prince and financial manager
- Matthew Hobden (1993–2016), cricketer
- Ben Hollioake (1977–2002), cricketer
- Rachel Hood (born 1953), barrister and racehorse owner
- Sam Hooper (born 1998), field hockey player
- Ed Horler (born 1995), field hockey player
- Paul Howe (born 1968), swimmer
- Anthony Hudson (born 1981), footballer and football manager
- Martin Hughes-Games (born 1956), television producer and presenter
- Ella Hunt (born 1998), actress and singer-songwriter
- Jon Hunt (born 1953), billionaire businessman
- Andrew Hunter (born 1986), swimmer
- Princess Alia bint Hussein (born 1956), member of Jordanian royal family
- Giles Hussey (born 1997), tennis player
- Jack Huston (born 1982), actor and director
- Paul Hutchins (1945–2019), tennis player

=== I ===
- Muhammad Isa Ahmad (born 1998), swimmer

=== J ===
- Ed Jackson (born 1988), rugby union player
- Azmet Jah (born 1960), head of the House of Asaf Jahi and cinematographer
- Margot James (born 1957), politician
- Penny James (born 1969), businesswoman
- Adrian Jardine (born 1933), sailor
- Stuart Jardine (1933–2023), sailor
- Andrew Jarrett (born 1958), tennis player
- Sarah Jarvis (born 1962), general practitioner and broadcaster
- Giorgio Jegher (1937–1997), long-distance runner
- Will Jenkins (born 1994), cricketer
- Dan John (born 2001), rugby union player
- Nigel Johnson (born 1953), swimmer
- Evan Jones (born 2004), swimmer
- Huw Jones (born 1993), rugby union player
- Robin Jones (born 1973), cricketer
- Simon Jones (born 1978), cricketer
- Susan Jones (born 1954), swimmer
- Jonathan Joseph (born 1991), rugby union player
- Will Joseph (born 2002), rugby union player

=== K ===
- Tazana Kamanga-Dyrbak (born 2002), sprinter
- Dominic Kelly (born 2005), cricketer
- Ruth Kelly (born 1968), politician
- Peter Kemp (1934–2008), civil servant
- Sharif Khan (born 1945), squash player
- Arvind Khanna (born 1967), politician and businessman
- Nabila Khashoggi (born 1962), actress and businesswoman
- Craig Kieswetter (born 1987), cricketer
- Urška Klakočar Zupančič (born 1977), jurist and politician
- Ömer Koç (born 1962), businessman and art collector
- John Kovalic (born 1962), cartoonist and game designer
- Cameron Kurle (born 1997), swimmer

=== L ===
- Richard Lane (born 1993), rugby union player
- Jason Laslett (born 1969), field hockey player
- Kevin Latouf (born 1985), cricketer
- Ned Leonard (born 2002), cricketer
- Peter Lerpiniere (born 1957), swimmer
- Charlotte Leslie (born 1978), politician
- Rose Leslie (born 1987), actress
- Robin Lett (born 1986), cricketer
- Ian Liddell-Grainger (born 1959), politician
- Hugh Lindsay (1953–1988), equerry to Elizabeth II
- Ollie Lindsay-Hague (born 1990), rugby union player
- Stephen Long (born 1951), field hockey player
- David Luckes (born 1969), field hockey player

=== M ===
- Dominic Mahony (born 1964), modern pentathlete
- Prince Paul Wossen-Seged Makonnen, Duke of Harar (1947–2021), Ethiopian royal
- John Mallett (born 1970), rugby union player
- Richard Mantell (born 1981), field hockey player
- Simon Mantell (born 1984), field hockey player
- Peter Marsh (born 1951), field hockey player
- Peter Marshall (born 1971), squash player
- Rosalind Maskell (1928–2016), microbiologist
- Will Matthews (born 1985), rugby union player
- Amelia Maughan (born 1996), swimmer
- Simon Mawer (1948–2025), author
- Barbara Maxwell (1943–2025), television producer
- Tom Maynard (1989–2012), cricketer
- Keith McAdam (born 1945), cricketer and physician
- John McFall (born 1981), sprinter and astronaut
- Garth McGimpsey (born 1955), golfer
- Shane McGuigan (born 1988), boxing trainer
- Meghrajji III (1923–2010), maharaja of Dhrangadhra-Halvad
- Barbara Mensah (born 1959), judge
- Wayne Michaels (born 1959), stuntman and stunt arranger
- Tyrone Mings (born 1993), footballer
- Clare Montgomery (born 1958), barrister and judge
- Nick Monu (born 1965), actor and director
- Olly Morgan (born 1985), rugby union player
- Max Mosley (1940–2021), businessman and racing driver
- Lady Tatiana Mountbatten (born 1990), equestrian

=== N ===
- James Nathan (born 1973), head chef
- Arun Nayar (born 1964), businessman and former husband of Liz Hurley
- Conor Niland (born 1981), tennis player and author
- Sam Nixon (born 1996), rugby union player
- Aneurin Norman (born 1991), cricketer
- John Norman (born 1936), cricketer
- Lando Norris (born 1999), racing driver, entrepreneur, CEO of Quadrant
- Max Northcote-Green (born 1994), rugby union player
- Filip Nowacki (born 2007), swimmer
- Ben Nugent (born 1992), footballer

=== O ===
- Mark Odejobi (born 1988), rugby union player
- Gabriel Oghre (born 1998), rugby union player
- Abimbola Ogunbanjo (1962–2024), businessman
- Ola Onabule (born 1964), singer-songwriter
- Adesuwa Oni (born 1989), actress
- Peter Openshaw (born 1954), immunologist
- Chris Oti (born 1965), rugby union player
- Jack Owlett (born 1995), rugby union player

=== P ===
- Martin Page (1938–2003), author and journalist
- Sharan Pasricha (born 1980), hotelier
- Nick Patrick (born 1957), record producer
- Matt Perry (born 1977), rugby union player
- Lady Melissa Percy (born 1987), fashion designer and tennis player
- Alex Pettyfer (born 1990), actor and model
- Ben Peyton (born 1977), actor
- Paul Philippe of Romania (born 1948), member of the Romanian royal family
- Mia Phiri (born 2003), swimmer
- Daniel Poleshchuk (born 1996), squash player
- Kieran Powell (born 1990), cricketer
- Lakshraj Prakash (born 2004), maharaja of Sirmur

=== Q ===
- Marc Quinn (born 1964), visual artist

=== R ===
- Anthony Radziwiłł (1959–1999), television executive and filmmaker
- Purav Raja (born 1985), tennis player
- Mary Rand (1940–2026), long jump athlete
- Grace Rapp (born 1995), footballer
- Reuben Reid (born 1988), footballer
- Toby Reynolds-Cotterill (born 1997), field hockey player
- Mimi Rhodes (born 2001), golfer
- Patience Rhodes (born 2004), golfer
- Emily Richards (born 2001), swimmer
- Ewan Richards (born 2002), rugby union player
- Matt Richards (born 2002), swimmer
- Michael Ridpath (born 1961), author
- Eden Robinson (born 2006), multi-event athlete
- Chris Robshaw (born 1986), rugby union player
- Paul Roebuck (born 1963), cricketer
- Peter Roebuck (1956–2011), cricketer and newspaper columnist
- Danilo Rosafio (born 2001), swimmer
- Hazel Rossotti (1930–2023), chemist and writer
- Roland Rudd (born 1961), public relations executive
- Rhys Ruddock (born 1990), rugby union player
- Stuart Rushmere (born 2000), field hockey player

=== S ===
- Jazmin Sawyers (born 1994), long jump athlete
- Christopher Sayers (born 1978), cricketer
- Jami Schlueter (born 2002), multi-event athlete
- Daphne Schrager (born 2000), para-cyclist
- John Senior (born 1960), founder of Heroes Welcome UK
- John Sergeant (born 1944), journalist and broadcaster
- Nick Servini (born 1980), journalist and news presenter
- Marcia Sey (born 2001), sprint hurdler
- Nicholas Shackell (born 1974), swimmer
- Amar Shah (born 1985), swimmer
- Callum Sheedy (born 1995), rugby union player
- Nicollette Sheridan (born 1963), actress
- Edward Sinclair (born 1980), swimmer
- Padmanabh Singh (born 1998), polo player
- Jemma Simpson (born 1984), middle-distance runner
- Sir Benjamin Slade (born 1946), aristocrat and businessman
- Phil Slocombe (born 1954), cricketer
- Will Smeed (born 2001), cricketer
- Julian Smith (born 1971), politician
- Daniel Speers (born 1997), swimmer
- John Standing (born 1934), actor
- Hamish Steele (born 1991), animator and television writer
- Sarah Stirk (born 1978), television presenter
- Christopher Stott (born 1969), space entrepreneur
- Colette Sultana (born 1995), squash player
- Arul Suppiah (born 1983), cricketer
- Luke Sutton (born 1976), cricketer

=== T ===
- Milly Tanner (born 1999), track cyclist
- Asa'ad bin Tariq (born 1954), member of the Omani royal family
- Paul Terry (born 1959), cricketer
- Henry Thomas (born 1991), rugby union player
- Jeremy Thomas (born 1949), film producer
- Rosie Thomas (born 1947), journalist and author
- Elise Thorner (born 2001), steeplechase athlete
- George Timmins (born 2005), rugby union player
- Richard Timms (born 1986), molecular biologist and cricketer
- Yvonne Tobis (born 1948), swimmer
- Robert Todd (born 1975), field hockey player
- Isabella Tree (born 1964), author and conservationist
- Harvey Trump (born 1968), cricketer
- Malcolm Tucker (born 1947), swimmer
- Robert Turner (born 1967), cricketer

=== V ===
- Vajiralongkorn (born 1952), king of Thailand
- Tamryn van Selm (born 2004), swimmer
- Grace Vans Agnew (born 2000), middle-distance runner
- Archie Vaughan (born 2005), cricketer
- Mako Vunipola (born 1991), rugby union player

=== W ===
- Jehangir Wadia (born 1973), businessman
- Ness Wadia (born 1971), businessman
- Ben Wallace (born 1970), politician
- Max Waller (born 1988), cricketer
- Ian Ward (born 1972), cricketer and broadcaster
- Jinjett Wattanasin (born 2001), actor and singer
- Sam Weller (born 1994), cricketer
- Cleve West (born 1958), garden designer
- Isabelle Westbury (born 1990), sports journalist and cricketer
- Adam Wheater (born 1990), cricketer
- Tom Whiteley (1995), rugby union player
- James Whitley (born 1997), alpine skier
- Chris Wickham (born 1950), historian
- Brodie Williams (born 1999), swimmer
- J. P. R. Williams (1949–2024), rugby union player
- Sophie Williams (born 1991), fencer
- Harry Williamson (born 1950), musician and producer
- Peter Wilson (born 1986), sport shooter
- Sarah Winckless (born 1973), rower

=== Y ===
- Sam Young (born 2000), cricketer
