= Nick Pisani =

Bloggers

Nicholas John Pisani (born 23 December 1962) is a British television producer, and a former Editor of Question Time.

== Early life ==
He was born in Hampshire. He has a younger brother (born 1966). He attended independent school from 1976 to 1981. He attended the National Broadcasting School in London.

== Career ==
=== Radio ===
He has been a radio producer for LBC on its mid-morning show. In the 1990s he was also a producer at Sky Sports.

=== Mentorn ===
In the late 1990s, he was a producer on Question Time.

From 2000 to 2006 he was Editor of Question Time on BBC One, produced by Mentorn, who were bought by Tinopolis in 2006. The previous editor, Charlie Courtauld (1966 - February 2016), joined the Independent on Sunday. He increased the number of panelists from four to five, when a producer in October 1998. He took the programme time from 11pm to 10.30pm. He would choose the questions that were submitted to the panelists. Question Time began in September 1979.

On 8 May 2003, the BBC (Mentorn) trialled a programme called Answer Time on BBC Four, a 40-minute television version from 11.35pm of Any Answers?; BBC Radio 5 Live now effectively does the same thing on Thursday evenings.

Hours before the programme was due to be recorded on broadcast on Thursday 4 May 2006 before the results of the 2006 United Kingdom local elections, when aged 44, he left his post as Editor. He has been criticised for dumbing down the programme, by inviting less-mainstream guests onto the programme, but this has been also viewed by others as making the programme less stuffy, conformist and narrow-mindedly bipartisan; previous editors had begun the trend.

=== BBC ===
Since 2009 he has been the executive producer of Intelligence Squared, which is shown globally on BBC World News.

== Personal life ==
He lives in London.

Media offices
Preceded by New series	Executive Producer of Intelligence Squared on BBC World News; January 2009 -	Succeeded by Incumbent
Preceded by Charlie Courtauld	Editor of Question Time; January 2000 - May 2006	Succeeded by
