= Question Time (TV programme) =

British topical debate TV programme

- Title card since 2022
- Genre: Topical debate
- Directed by: Rob Hopkin
- Presented by: Current: Fiona Bruce (2019–present); Former: Robin Day (1979–1989); Peter Sissons (1989–1993); David Dimbleby (1994–2018)
- Country of origin: United Kingdom
- Original language: English
- No. of series: 47
- No. of episodes: 1,638 (list of episodes)

Production
- Executive producer: Nicolai Gentchev
- Production location: On location
- Editor: Gerry Gay
- Running time: 60 minutes
- Production companies: Brian Lapping Productions (previously); Mentorn Media (currently)

Original release
- Network: BBC One
- Release: 25 September 1979 – present

Related
- Any Answers?; Any Questions?; Dateline London; HARDtalk; Newsnight; Debate Night; Question Time Extra Time

Question Time is a topical debate programme, typically broadcast on BBC One at 10:45 pm on Thursdays. It is usually repeated on BBC Two (with British Sign Language) and on BBC Parliament later in the week. Leaders specials are broadcast simultaneously on BBC News. Question Time is also available on BBC iPlayer. Fiona Bruce currently chairs the show having succeeded David Dimbleby as presenter in January 2019.

The programme usually takes annual Westminster recess-style breaks especially at Christmas, Easter and Summer.

Mentorn has produced the programme since 1998.

== Origins ==
Question Time was first broadcast on Tuesday 25 September 1979, based on the BBC Radio 4 programme Any Questions? The first panel consisted of Labour MP Michael Foot, author Edna O'Brien, Conservative politician Teddy Taylor, and the Archbishop of Liverpool Derek Worlock.

== Format ==
Question Time panels are typically composed of five public figures, "nearly always [including] a representative from the UK government and the official opposition." The panel also features "representatives from other political parties across the series, taking as [its] guide the level of electoral support at national level which each party enjoys."

High-profile journalists and authors, television and radio broadcasters, and comedians, join the panel, as do business leaders from well-known companies, and leading or expert academics, lawyers, police officers, and clerics.

With the exceptions of Margaret Thatcher and Rishi Sunak, every British Prime Minister that has held office since the programme began in 1979 has appeared as a regular panelist at some point. Sunak did appear as a panelist once, in a party leader's edition broadcast during the 2024 General Election campaign on June 24. Additionally, former Prime Ministers Edward Heath and James Callaghan also participated in panels, with Callaghan's single appearance coming in a special edition marking the resignation of Thatcher on 22 November 1990. Additionally, every leader of the Conservative party after Thatcher and prior to Rishi Sunak, Labour after Harold Wilson and the Liberal/Liberal Democrat parties after Clement Davies with the single exception of Jeremy Thorpe, have appeared as panelists.

Audience members are selected by the 'audience producer' based on age, gender, occupation, ethnicity, disability status, voting intention, voting history, and party membership. The audience members are "requested to come up with two questions, to be considered for the programme." The panel hears the questions for the first time, when the audience members ask them. Applicants are contacted on the Monday, Tuesday, or Wednesday before the programme, although due to a "high volume of requests", the team are unable to call everyone.

Question Time is usually recorded "as-live", and in a single-take, shortly before transmission. The programme is only edited on "very rare" occasions for legal or taste reasons, or because it over-runs. For example, The Observer newspaper reported in 1986 that "The BBC's lawyers ordered nine seconds of Question Time to be deleted by the old-fashioned method of simply cutting off the sound".

== Presenters ==
=== Sir Robin Day ===
Veteran broadcaster Robin Day was the programme's first chair, presenting it for nearly 10 years until June 1989. Question Time soon gained popularity under Day's lead, with his quick wit and interrogation skills. His famous catchphrase when he had introduced the panel was: "There they are, and here we go."

The programme was mainly filmed at the Greenwood Theatre in London on the south side of London Bridge. Day's last appearance as presenter was broadcast from Paris on 12 July 1989. He was allowed to choose his own guests.

=== Peter Sissons ===
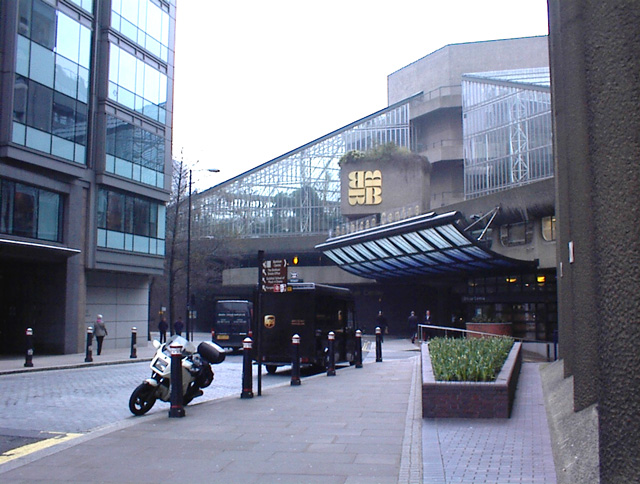
The Barbican Centre

After Day retired, Peter Sissons took over and continued until 1993. The BBC decided to widen the programme's appeal by moving it around the country. The programme also changed its London location from the Greenwood Theatre to the Barbican Centre. Sissons' tenure as Question Time chair included three different editors. There were several problems during filming, including a bomb scare during a live recording, which resulted in the programme being taken off the air, and the death of an audience member who collapsed while recording.

The programme continued to enjoy good ratings during this period, notably on the day of Margaret Thatcher's resignation on 22 November 1990, which featured two different panels over two editions.

=== David Dimbleby ===
David Dimbleby succeeded Sissons as Question Time presenter in 1994, after the BBC held two pilot show auditions between Dimbleby and Jeremy Paxman, with two different audiences and two different panels. For a brief period under Dimbleby in the mid-1990s, there were a number of variations to the format, including the audience using voting keypads to take a poll of the audience at the end of the programme and Dimbleby getting out of his seat at intervals to question the audience.

Dimbleby presented Question Time for 25 years, the programme's longest-serving presenter, until his final programme, aged 80, on 13 December 2018.

=== Fiona Bruce ===
In December 2018, the BBC announced that Fiona Bruce would succeed Dimbleby as moderator. Bruce—along with Samira Ahmed, Victoria Derbyshire, Emily Maitlis, Nick Robinson, and Kirsty Wark—attended October 2018 auditions at London's James Allen's Girls' School. She presented her first Question Time in January 2019.

=== Guest presenters ===
Question Time has seen various presenters deputise for the main chair. Sir Ludovic Kennedy, Sue Lawley (the first woman to chair the programme), Bernard Levin (who is the only person to have been both programme chair and a panelist), and Donald MacCormick, all moderated in Day's place.

In November 2009, John Humphrys presented in lieu of Dimbleby, who had been "injured by a bullock at his farm" causing him "briefly to be knocked out." In June 2017, Nick Robinson presented a "Leaders Special" edition of Question Time. The programme was moved for news coverage of the London Bridge attack. Dimbleby was preparing for the General Election coverage. Victoria Derbyshire presented the 31 March 2022 edition of Question Time in place of Bruce.

== Editors ==
The original 'producer' of Question Time when it began in 1979 was Barbara Maxwell. In 1983, Maxwell was promoted to 'Executive Producer' with Liz Elton becoming the show's producer/editor. At the same time, Ann Morley became the show's regular Director; putting the key production roles entirely in female control. Later in 1983, the role of Executive Producer was renamed 'Editor'. In 1986, Antonia Charlton and Anne Carragher replace Morley and Elton as the show's regular director and producer. After 11 years at the helm, Maxwell stepped down from the show in 1990, with her replacement James Hogan editing his first edition on 20 September 1990 Alexandra Henderson took over as editor on 12 September 1991 Christopher Capron became Series Editor in September 1994 Charlie Courtauld was editor from 1998 to 2000, leaving to join the Independent on Sunday as its comment editor. Nick Pisani was appointed in 2000, resigning abruptly in May 2005 after news was leaked that he had been offered a job as David Cameron's head of TV presentation. Ed Havard was made acting editor in May 2005 after Pisani left. During his time in charge the BBC offered a seat on the panel to Nick Griffin in 2009. He left when the programme's production base moved to Glasgow.

Gill Penlington, the ITV News political producer, was made interim editor in May 2008, when the BBC gave Ed Havard a year-long sabbatical.

== Interactivity ==
=== SMS contributions ===
Viewers of the show can submit comments to the show via SMS; until October 2012 a selection of those comments was posted on Ceefax. Comments were edited and put to air by a team of four journalists based at Television Centre in London. The system displayed one message at a time, and usually showed several tens of messages throughout each hour-long episode. The system's popularity sprang from its mix of serious and light-hearted comments. On average, around 3,500 texts are received during each hour-long programme.

=== Twitter ===
On 24 September 2009, the show launched its Twitter presence and the show's presenter has regularly announced its presence on Twitter since late 2009. Using the Twitter ID "@bbcquestiontime" it tweeted using the #bbcqt hashtag. By early 2010, this had become one of the UK's most active "Twitter backchannels" to a TV show. @bbcquestiontime claimed 10,000 tweets had been sent around the show on 7 October 2010. The show had over 40,000 followers on Twitter by October 2010 and this exceeded 50,000 on the evening of 3 February 2011.

On 9 June 2011, Question Time became one of the most-tweeted about shows of the week in the UK, with 5,000 tweets during the programme, with tweeting continuing through to the next day. In addition to the more sober analysis of the discussion, Question Time also has a parallel Twitter backchannel based on the spoof account Dimblebot - purportedly a robot version of Dimbleby - where the entire premise of the programme is claimed to be a demonstration of Dimbleby's ability to defeat the panel. It became clear during the riot special that David Dimbleby knows of the existence of Dimblebot and the associated Dimbledance. The @bbcquestiontime account now has over 500,000 followers.

In March 2020, Sayeeda Warsi, Baroness Warsi and MP Debbie Abrahams sent an open letter to the programme's runners, after Question Time uploaded anti-immigrants Twitter comments from a far-right supporter who allegedly also ran for the National Front and showed support for the English Defence League. Baroness Warsi and Abrahams wrote in their letter: "We understand the producers of the show seek out ‘controversial members of the audience – including those of far-right campaign groups – in an attempt to curry large ratings... By providing a platform for views that are racist or sexist, the institution is normalising them and contributing to the coarsening of public debate and the growing toxicity of our politics."

== Locations ==
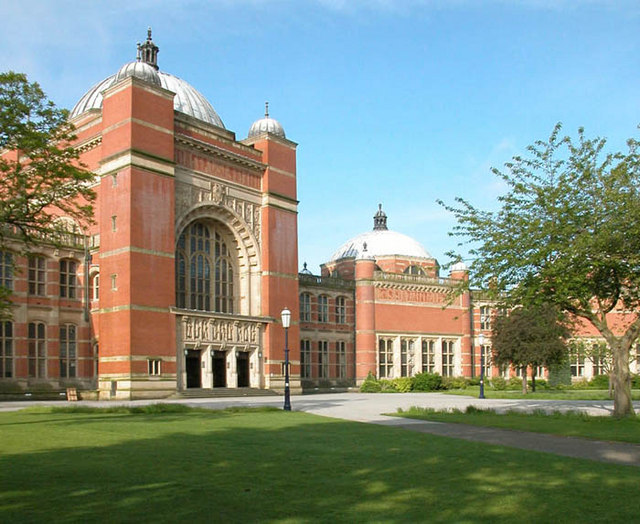

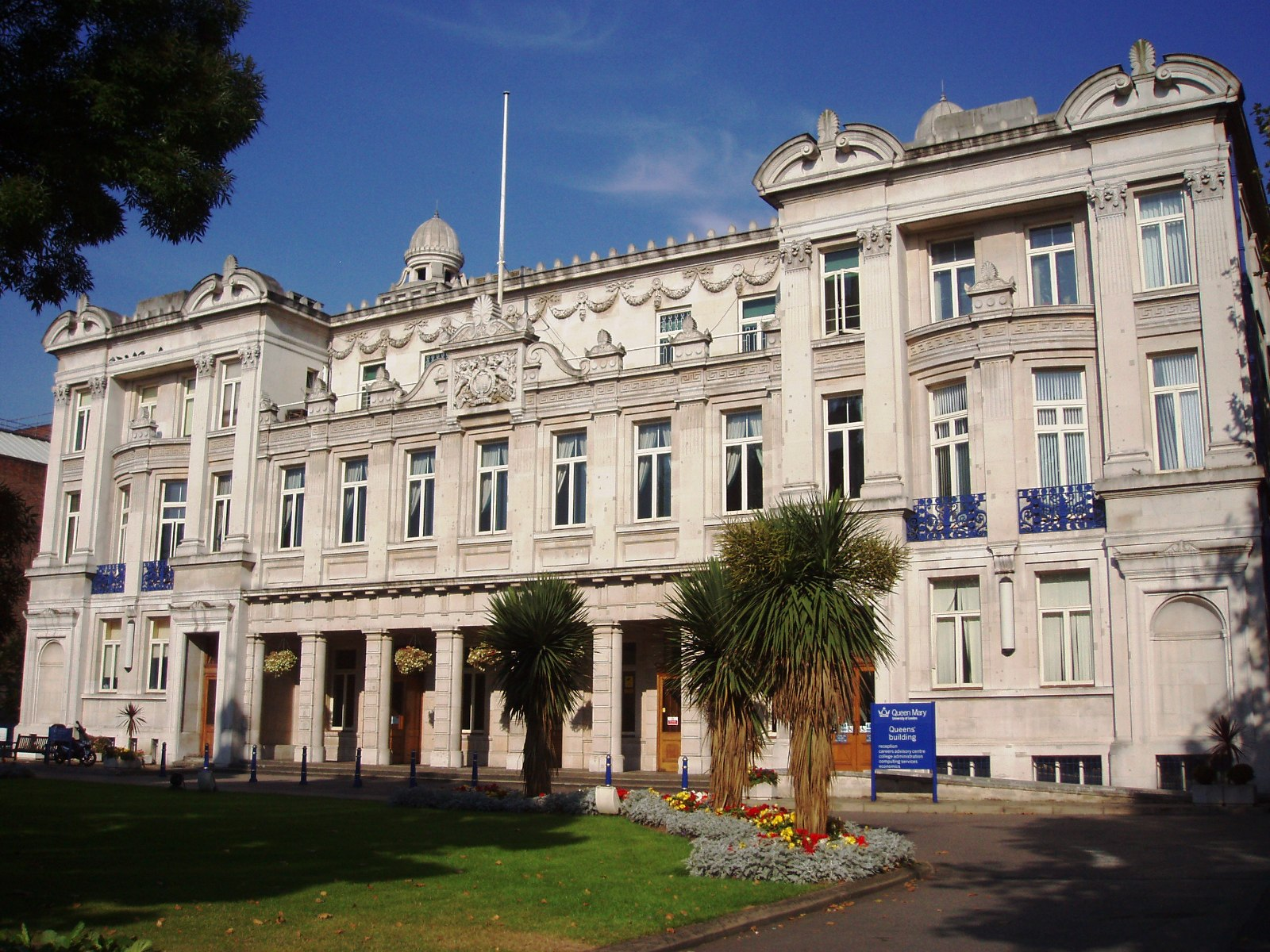
The University of Birmingham and Queen Mary University of London

=== Venues ===
Question Time is filmed at a variety of different types of building, these have included: educational buildings, arts venues, and government buildings... airports, religious buildings, and prisons.

The programme has been broadcast from the Scottish Parliament, the Welsh Parliament, and Westminster Hall.

Heathrow Airport, Wormwood Scrubs Prison, and the cathedrals of St Paul's and Winchester, have all hosted Question Time.

LSO St Luke's and the Sage are among the arts venues to have held the programme and Queen Mary University of London and the University of Birmingham have also hosted Question Time.

=== Production ===
The show is recorded at different venues throughout the UK. but the main office of the programme is BBC Scotland in Glasgow.

== Famous editions ==
In early 1981, David Steel declared his support in principle for "a marriage" between the Liberal Party and any party which might be formed by the Gang of Four; David Owen, who was also on the programme, said he could see advantages in an "electoral alliance" between them. This foreshadowed the period 1983–1987 when Owen and Steel were Leaders of the SDP–Liberal Alliance and tension grew over whether their deal was a prelude to a merger of the parties or merely a temporary electoral pact.

During the 1983 election campaign, Conservative Foreign Secretary Francis Pym was asked by an A-level student named Andy Davis about the implications of the Conservatives winning the election with a landslide victory. He began by casting doubt on the likelihood of this happening and then observed "I think landslides on the whole don't produce successful governments". Margaret Thatcher later wrote that the remark "struck a wrong note": "people drew the inference that he did not want us to win a large majority". Following the election (won by the Conservatives on a landslide) she sacked him as Foreign Secretary, partly because of his gaffe.

In a 1984 edition, Alan Clark, a junior government Minister at the time, was openly critical of a government decision to buy a foreign-made missile system, prompting guest host Sue Lawley to ask the audience, "Is there anyone here who wishes to defend the government on this, because its Minister doesn't?"

A 1994 edition was notable for a confrontation between Jeffrey Archer and the historian David Starkey over the age of homosexual consent. After arguing that 18 should be the age of consent, Archer was attacked by Starkey who told him: "Englishmen like you enjoy sitting on the fence so much because you enjoy the sensation." Archer replied "I enjoyed the very clever way you got a laugh ... I was not sitting on the fence and I was not compromising ... you don't have the right to doubt my beliefs and think just because you are an expert in this subject I don't have the right to say what I feel or get a cheap laugh out of it. I stand by 18 and I mean it."

The programme broadcast on 13 September 2001, which was devoted to the political implications of the September 11 attacks, featured many contributions from members of the audience who were anti-American, expressing the view that "the United States had it coming". The BBC received more than 2,000 complaints and later apologised to viewers for "causing" offence, stating that the edition should not have been broadcast live, but rather should have been recorded and edited.

In 2002, the editor of Private Eye, Ian Hislop, made an open attack on Jeffrey Archer, who had been imprisoned for perjury, when his wife Mary Archer was a fellow panellist. She was noticeably angry that the issue had been raised and criticised Hislop after the recording had finished.

In March 2007, an Iraq Special was broadcast, featuring Tony Benn, Benazir Bhutto, Des Browne, Liam Fox, Charles Kennedy and, via video link from Washington, D.C., John Bolton. The episode is featured clashes between Benn and Bolton.

On 11 October 2007, former editor of The Sun newspaper Kelvin MacKenzie appeared on the programme in Cheltenham and launched an attack on Scotland. During a debate about tax, MacKenzie claimed that "Scotland believes not in entrepreneurialism like London and the south east... Scots enjoy spending it (money) but they don't enjoy creating it, which is the opposite to down south." The comments came as part of an attack on Prime Minister Gordon Brown who MacKenzie said could not be trusted to manage the British economy because he was "a Scot" and a "socialist", and insisting that this was relevant to the debate. Fellow panellist Chuka Umunna from the think tank Compass called his comments "absolutely disgraceful", and booing and jeering were heard from the Cheltenham studio audience. The BBC received 350 complaints and MacKenzie's comments drew widespread criticism in both Scotland and England. On 3 July 2008, it was reported that the BBC Trust's editorial complaints unit had cleared the programme of any wrongdoing. Question Time then proceeded to broadcast the following question from Nick Hartley as part of the programme on the same evening: "After the media coverage of [Andy] Murray's rise and fall, are we now to infer that the English resent the Scots more than the Scots resent the English?" MacKenzie reappeared on the programme in Cardiff on 17 May 2012.

After he was elected to the European Parliament, Nick Griffin the leader of the British National Party was invited onto Question Time for the first time, to appear on 22 October 2009. The decision led to controversy and political debate. Hundreds of people protested outside BBC Television Centre as the edition was filmed; six people were arrested after 25 protesters forced their way into the main reception. The edition attracted eight million viewers, and also drew a large number of complaints as a result of its content. Griffin himself said that he would make a formal complaint to the BBC for the way he believed he was treated by the show's other guests and the audience, who he described as a "lynch mob."

An edition aired on 19 May 2011 was recorded at HM Prison Wormwood Scrubs in London. The episode was the first to feature prisoners as part of the audience, while panellists included Justice Secretary Kenneth Clarke who attempted to defend controversial remarks he had made earlier in the week about rape sentencing.

A special edition of the programme was aired on 11 August 2011 following the outbreak of rioting which had occurred during the previous weekend and earlier that week. Question Time had been off air for its annual summer break at the time and the edition was scheduled at short notice due to the English riots.

An appearance by George Galloway on the edition of 5 February 2015 recorded in Finchley gained much negative comment before the broadcast. Inviting Galloway, a politician who has been outspoken about Israel, onto the programme was thought to be provocative and insensitive because Finchley has a large Jewish minority. Galloway, who was heckled during a discussion about antisemitism, thought he had been defamed by a question posed to him, which insinuated that he should share some of the blame for a rise in antisemitic incidents during 2014.

On 23 November 2017 the programme was shortened because an audience member became ill and could not be safely moved.

On 19 March 2020 the programme broadcast from Weston-super-Mare was the first without an audience, due to the COVID-19 pandemic. On 26 March 2020 the programme moved to a semi-permanent home at the IMG Studios at Stockley Park in London as a measure to prevent unnecessary travel during the Coronavirus outbreak, the show followed a different format with no audience, the number of panellists reduced to four and the removal of the desk table, with the panellists and host now sitting on chairs in a semi-circle, 2m apart from one another in order to observe social distancing rules. At the same time, the programme moved to a new, temporary timeslot of 8pm, so that it could be broadcast live and allow viewers to submit their own questions to be answered on the programme.

Four-time Formula One World Champion and Grand Prix Drivers' Association, the trade union for F1, director Sebastian Vettel appeared on the 12 May 2022 edition, which was broadcast from Hackney.

== Audience figures ==
The highest audience figures to date were recorded when Nick Griffin of the BNP appeared in an episode on 22 October 2009; the audience reaching 8.3 million viewers.

On 14 May 2009, Question Time discussed the MPs' expenses row, with audience members heckling guest panellists Menzies Campbell and Margaret Beckett, the Labour MP, who was booed by the audience for insisting that her expenses were her privilege. The TV audience reached 3.8 million.

3.4 million people watched in 2003 at the start of the war on Iraq.

== Similar programmes ==
- A Welsh-language version, Pawb a'i Farn, has been broadcast on S4C since 1993.
- In 1994, BBC Scotland launched their own local debate show called Words with Wark which was broadcast on BBC One Scotland usually on the first Thursday of every month and this was presented by Kirsty Wark. The programme was axed in 1998.
- In 2019 BBC Scotland launched a similar show called Debate Night , presented by Stephen Jardine.
- Until 2010, BBC One Northern Ireland replaced Question Time with the more local debate show Let's Talk at least once a month hosted by Mark Carruthers, but this show has been axed and brought under the Spotlight brand. It is now shown once a month on Tuesday night with Noel Thompson. BBC One NI have their own political show called The View: this is broadcast live from 10.35pm to 11.20pm, presented by Mark Carruthers, and is followed by Question Time.
- BBC News (British TV channel) produces an international version of the programme called Global Questions, which airs on the News Channel and BBC World Service at weekends.
- The Irish broadcaster RTÉ produced a similar show, Questions and Answers, which ran from 1986 to 2009, and was replaced by The Frontline, which is of a similar format.
- In March 2010, Dermot O'Leary hosted a spinoff edition of the show, which was broadcast on BBC Three. It was called First Time Voters' Question Time, and the show was aimed at first time voters. This version of the programme was later commissioned on a permanent, monthly basis on BBC Three, to now be hosted by Richard Bacon, and re-titled Young Voters' Question Time. He was replaced by Jake Humphrey then by Rick Edwards with Tina Daheley, and the show was renamed Free Speech which goes out every month.
- In 2007, the BBC commissioned The Big Questions, a new programme with a similar format to Question Time, which focuses on ethical and religious issues. It is broadcast on BBC One on Sunday mornings between 10 am and 11 am. Both programmes are produced by Mentorn Media.
- In 2008, the Australian Broadcasting Corporation launched a similar, Australian version of the programme, called Q&A. Airing live weekly, it has become a critical success, achieving extremely positive ratings for the ABC in Australia, with a wide audience from a range of demographics not all of which are normally noted for their interest in the Australian political scene.
- In 2011, Azerbaijan launched its own version of the programme. Open Talk Azerbaijani: Açıq söhbət is a weekly debate ANS TV television programme in Azerbaijan, based on Question Time. The show features political leaders as well as other public figures. Open Talk is presented by Sevinj Osmanqizi.

=== Schools edition ===
Several schools editions have been broadcast:

- 20 June 2005, with a panel of Tony Benn, Justine Greening, Lembit Öpik, June Sarpong and Otis Ferry.
- 6 July 2006, with a twenty-year-old student joining David Miliband, Richard Madeley, Lord Coe and Julia Goldsworthy.
- 5 July 2007, an 18-year-old student joined a panel of Ed Miliband, Sayeeda Warsi, Davina McCall and Douglas Murray.
- 9 July 2009, one of the panellists was an eighteen-year-old student. Other panellists were Andy Burnham, Jeremy Hunt, Sarah Teather and Shami Chakrabarti.
