= Simon Beck =

Simon Beck may refer to:

- Simon Beck (luger) (born 1947), Liechtenstein luger
- Simon Beck (artist) (born 1958), British snow artist and former cartographer
