= Monu =

Monu may refer to:

- Monu Island, island of the Mamanuca Islands, Fiji
- MONU (magazine), an English-language, biannual magazine on urbanism
- Nick Monu (born 1965), Nigerian actor and director
- Ngozi Monu (born 1981), Nigerian swimmer
- Monu Kumar Indian cricketer
- Monu Moli New Zealand rugby union player
