= Nicolai Gentchev =

British-Bulgarian television producer and journalist

Nicolai Gentchev is a British-Bulgarian television producer and journalist, and the former editor of BBC One's Question Time from 2011.

== Early life ==
He was born in Bulgaria and moved to Britain aged 8. He attended St Paul's School, London, and the University of Glasgow where he studied Economic History with Russian Language and Literature.

== Career ==
=== Bloomberg News ===
He worked for Bloomberg News from 2000 to 2006, initially in multimedia and TV before becoming a producer and presenter for Bloomberg Radio.

=== BBC ===
He joined the BBC in April 2006. He initially worked as a presenter on BBC Radio 5 Live. He worked as a producer and output editor on BBC Radio 4's Today programme until 2010. From January 2010 to April 2011 he was editor of Good Morning Scotland, the main breakfast programme on BBC Radio Scotland. He became editor of BBC One's flagship debate show Question Time in April 2011, and took over as executive producer in September 2016. While working on Question Time he continued to work on projects related to Scotland, including a series of televised debates around the Scottish independence referendum in 2014.

=== Mentorn ===
Since 2016 Nicolai Gentchev has been employed as Director of Current Affairs by Mentorn, which produces Question Time, Panorama and other programmes for the BBC.
