= Sultan Abdullah bin Omar Al-Quaiti =

Sultan Abdullah bin Omar Al-Quaiti was the founder of Qu'aiti Sultanate in Hadhramaut, Yemen.

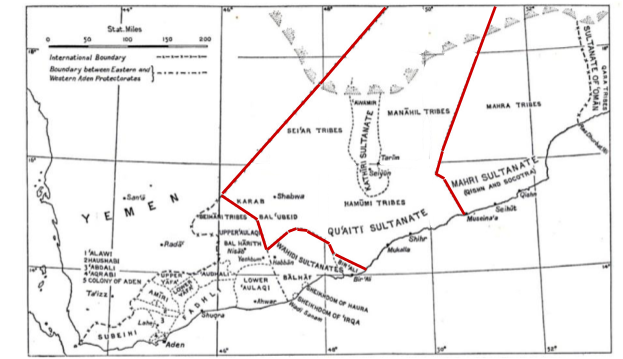
Map of Quaiti Sultanate

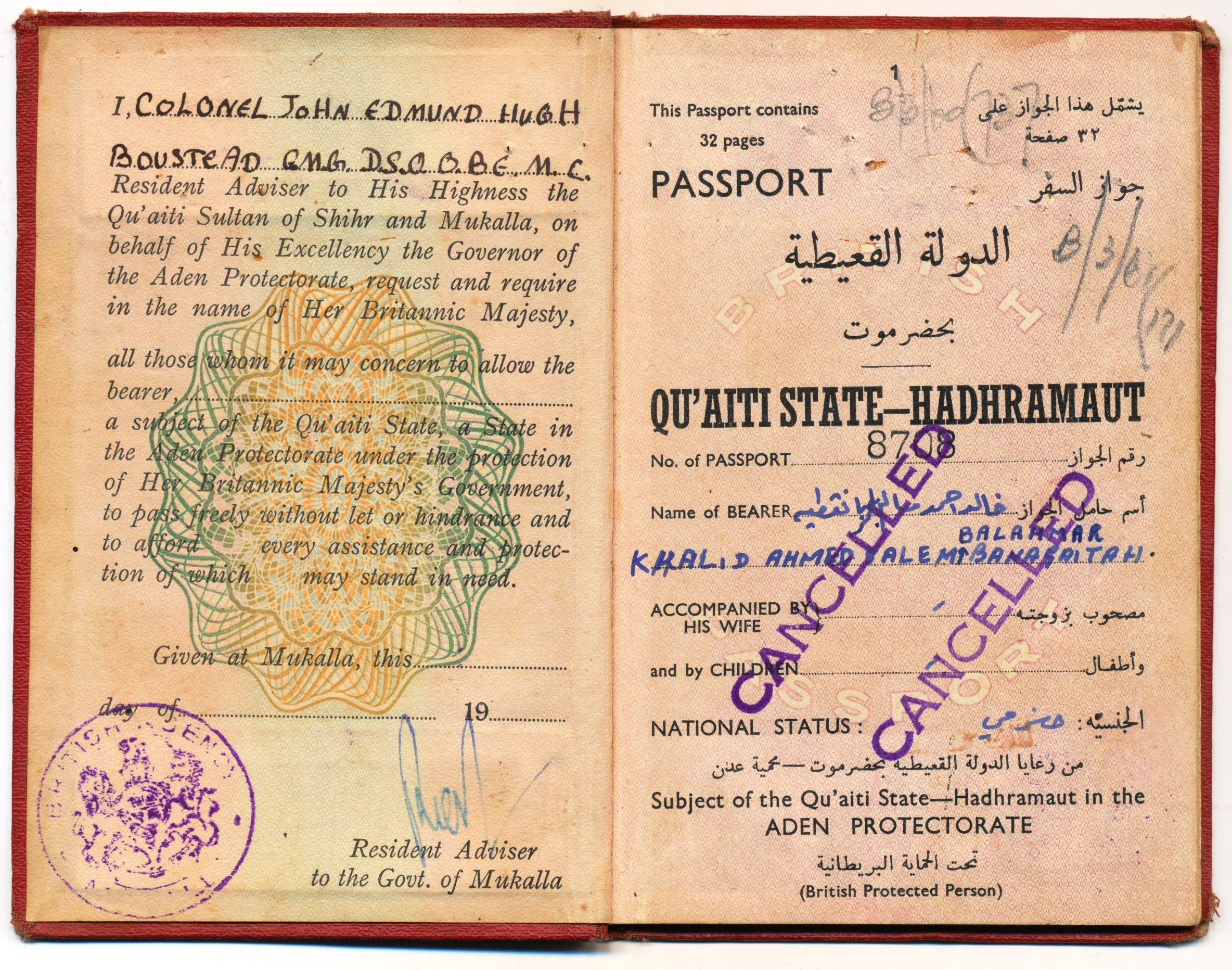
Passport of the Sultanate
