= Qu'aiti Sultan Palace =

Sultan Al-Qu'aiti Palace
- قصر السلطان القعيطي
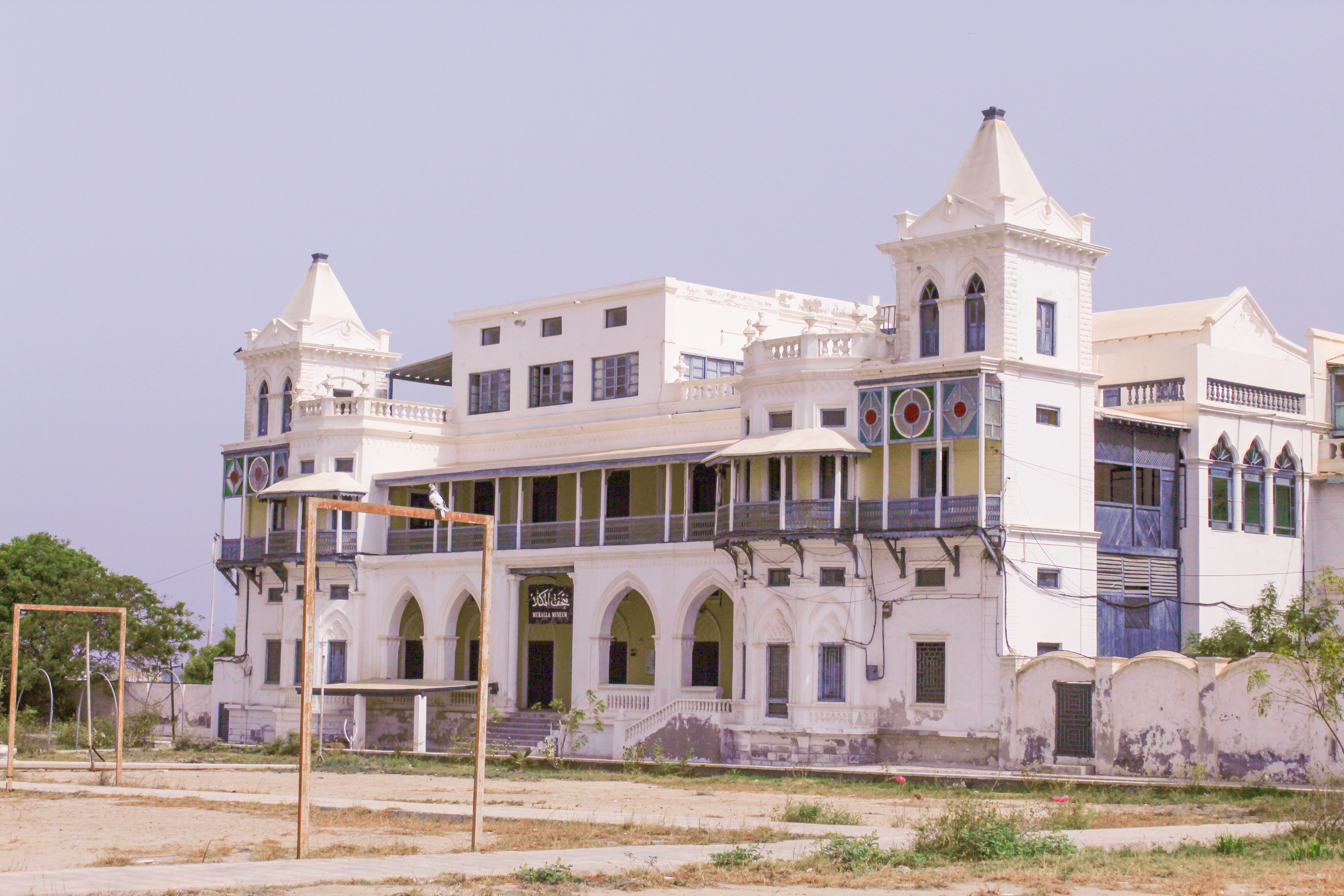
- Interactive map of Sultan Al-Qu'aiti Palace

General information
- Location: Al-Mukalla, Yemen
- Coordinates: 14.5337°N 49.1279°E
- Completed: 1925
- Owner: Government of Yemen

Height
- Architectural: Mukallawite, Indian, British Colonial

The Qu'aiti Sultan Palace (Arabic: قصر السلطان القعيطي, romanized: Qasr al-Sultan al-Qu'aiti) is a historical palace located in Mukalla, Yemen. It was built in 1925 under the rule of sultan Ghalib bin Awadh al-Qu'aiti and it served as the residence of every ruling Sultan of the Qu'aiti Sultanate since.

== History ==
The construction of the Palace began in 1925 under the patronage of Sultan Ghalib bin Awadh Al-Qu'aiti. The palace was designed to showcase the architectural styles influenced by Islamic, Ottoman, and British colonial elements. The Qu'aiti Sultanate was known for its strategic location on the southern coast of Yemen and its prosperity derived from trade, particularly in frankincense and spices.

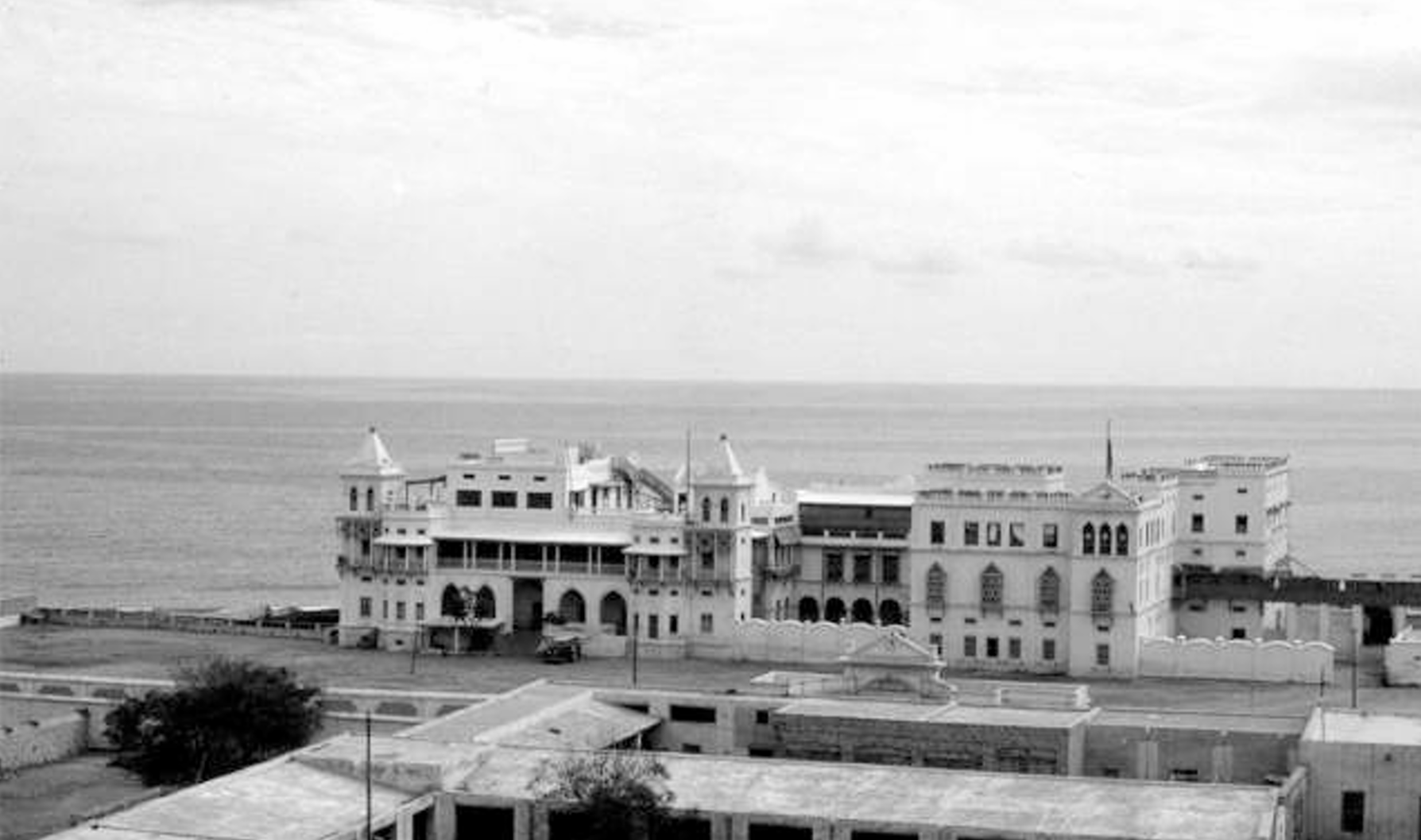
The palace before 1967

During its existence, the palace served as the official residence of the Qu'aiti rulers and witnessed numerous historical events. It was a center of political and cultural activity in the region, hosting visiting dignitaries, diplomats, and local leaders.

Following the overthrow of the Qu'aiti Sultanate in 1967 and the establishment of the People's Democratic Republic of Yemen, the palace lost its status as a royal residence and was dubbed "October 14th Palace".

== Architecture ==
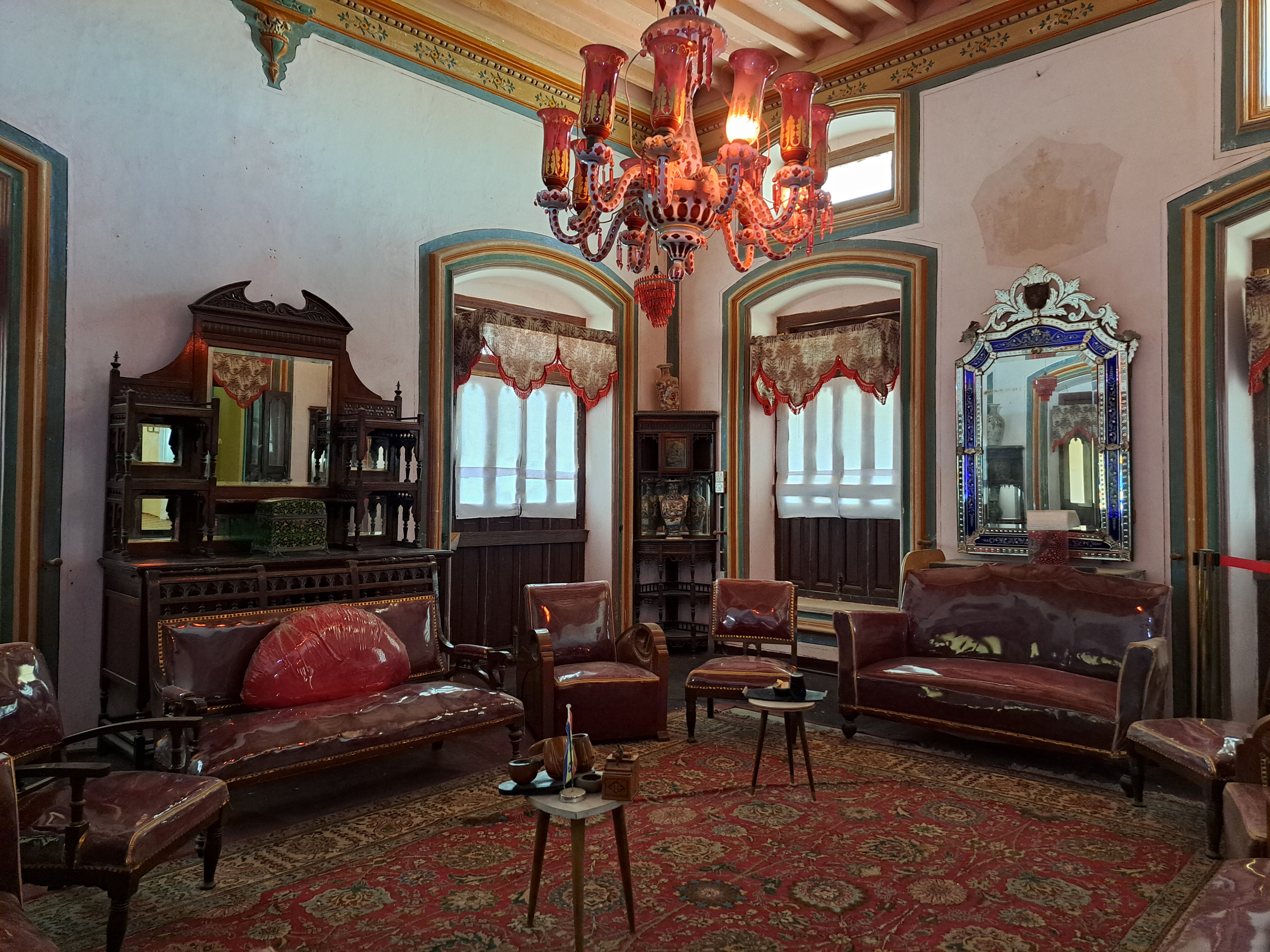
The "Red Hall" of the palace

The architectural style of the Palace reflects eastern Indian and British colonial influences. The palace features intricate carvings, ornamental motifs, and delicate details that showcase the craftsmanship of the period. The use of local materials such as stone and wood adds to the palace's aesthetic appeal.

The layout of the palace encompasses multiple courtyards, halls, and private chambers. The grand reception areas were designed to accommodate large gatherings and state functions. The interiors are adorned with colorful frescoes, decorative tiles, and luxurious furnishings, offering a glimpse into the opulent lifestyle of the ruling elite.

== Present day ==
Sultan Al-Qu’aiti Palace was built on a firth. It consists of three storeys and surrounded by a fence with big areas which contains corridors, a hall to receive guests, a meeting room and a wide room for running the state topped by a throne chair.

In recent years, the palace was completely transformed to a museum which consists of three suites.

== Gallery ==
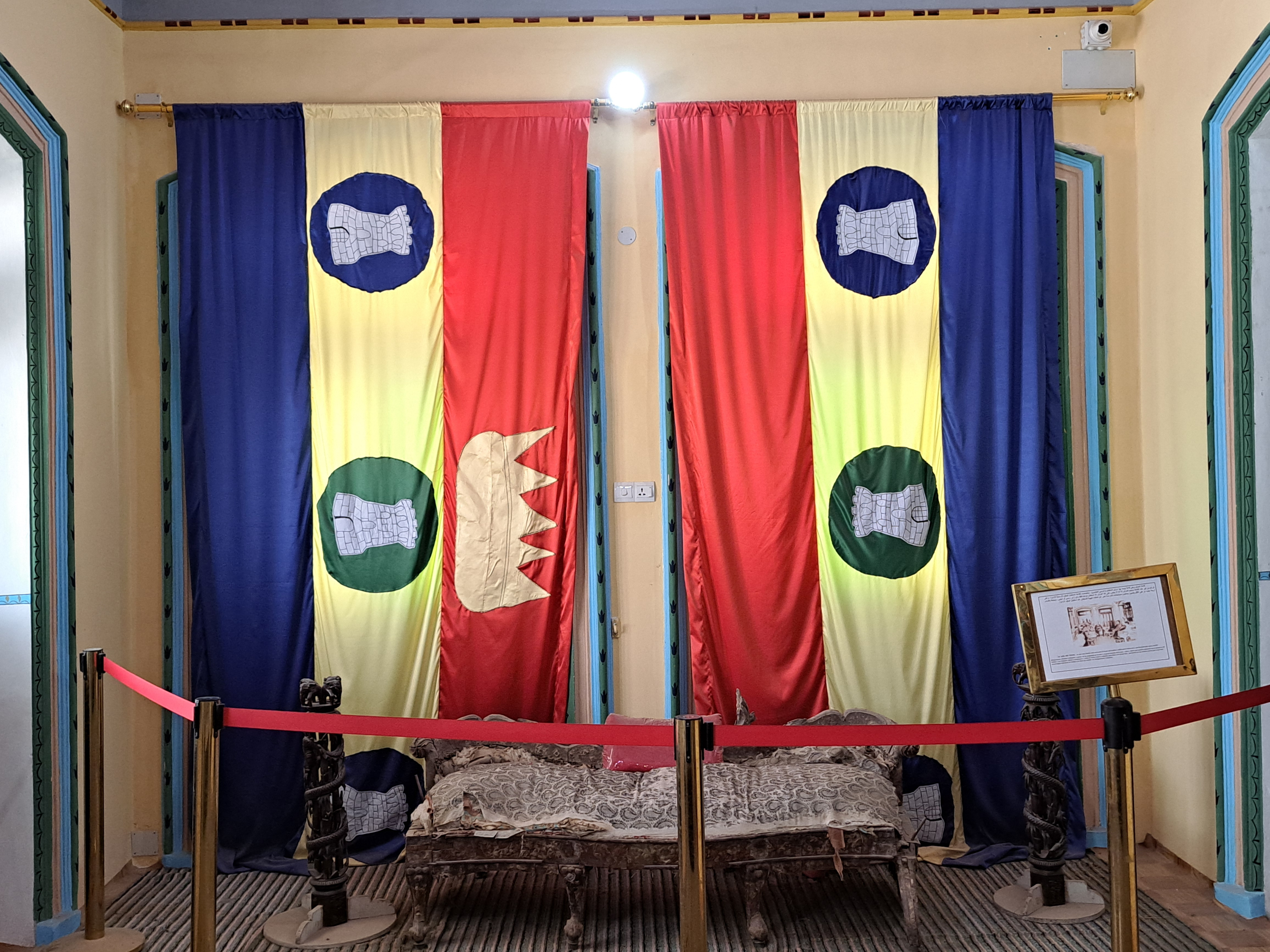

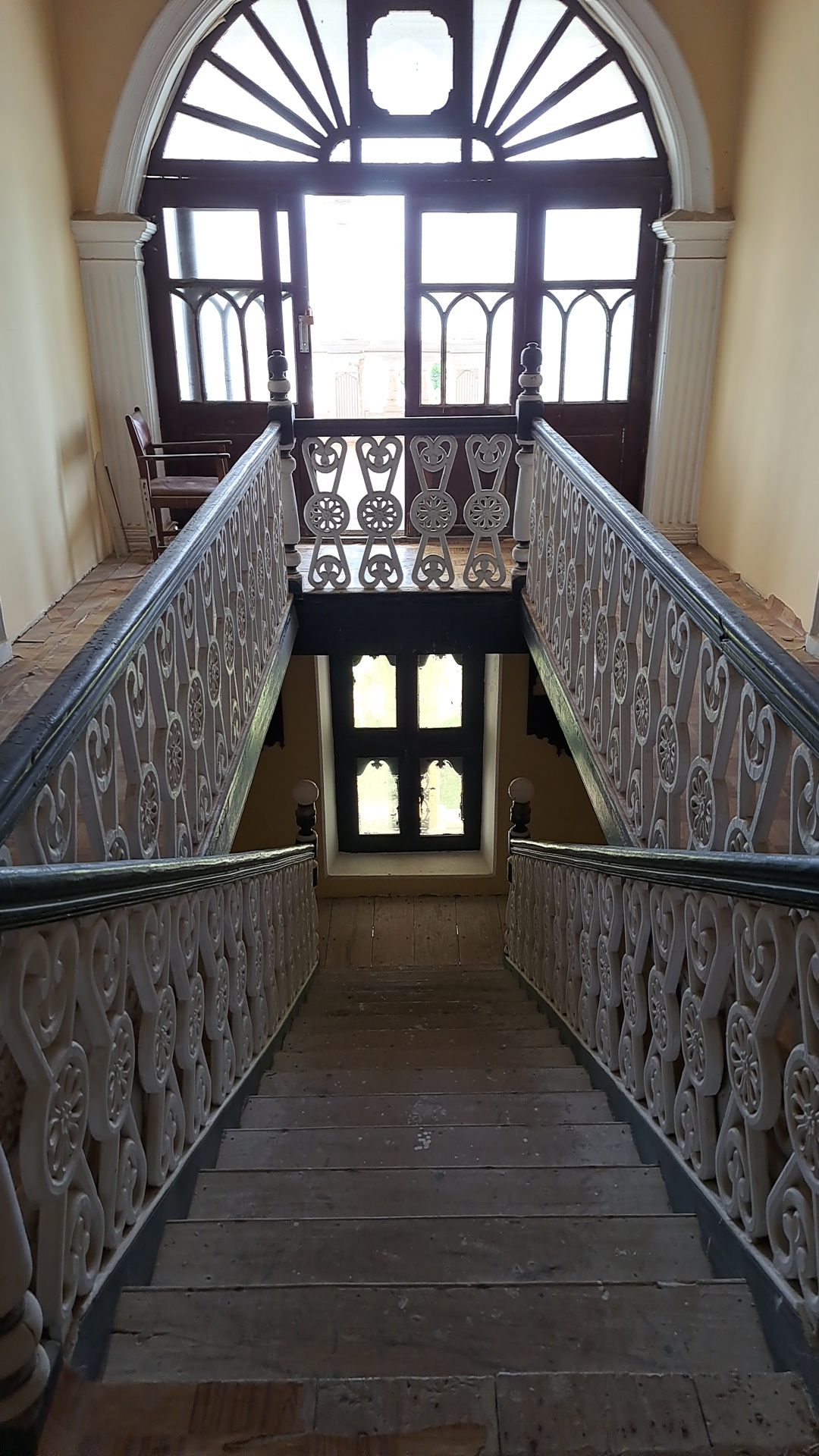

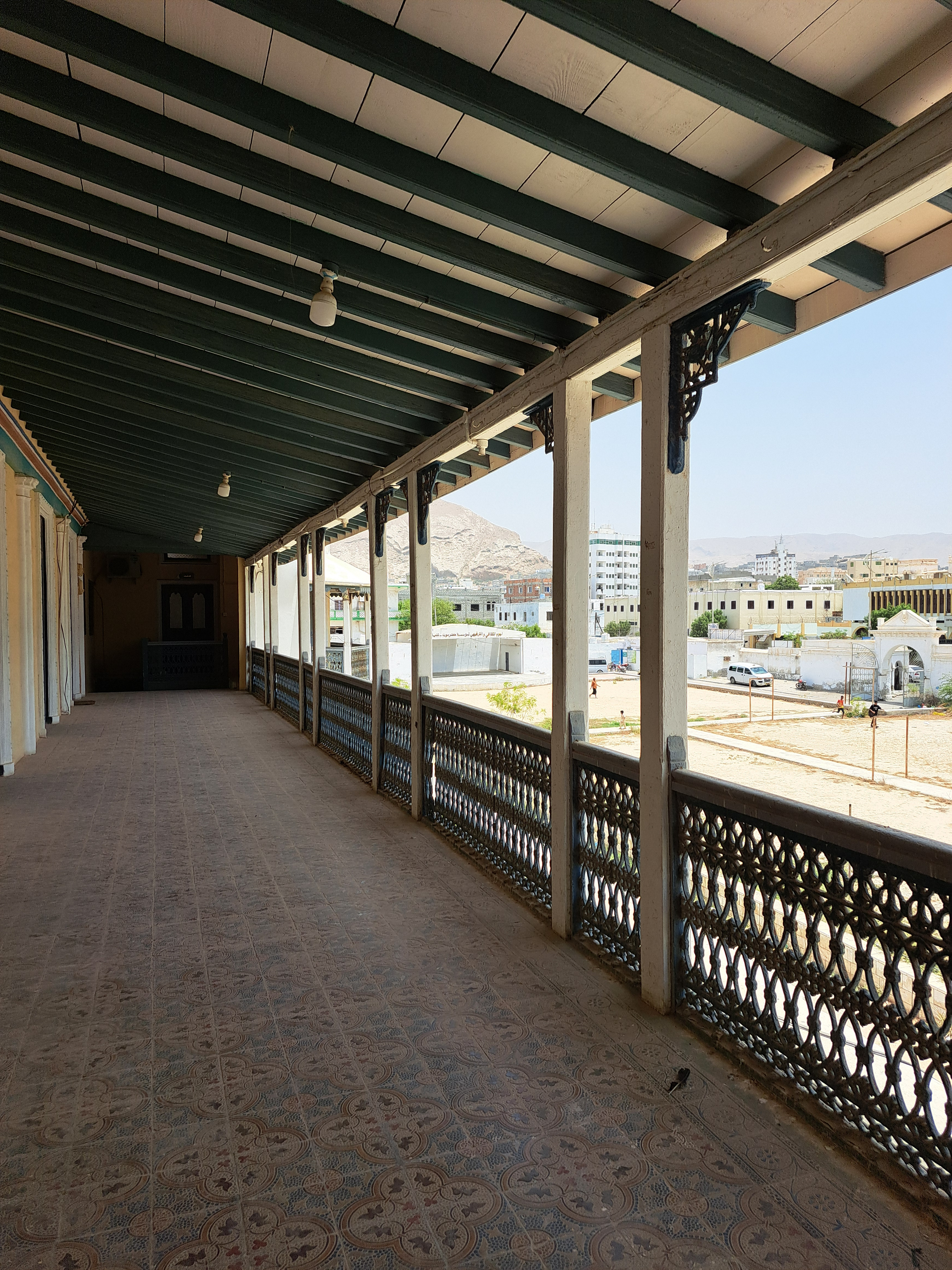

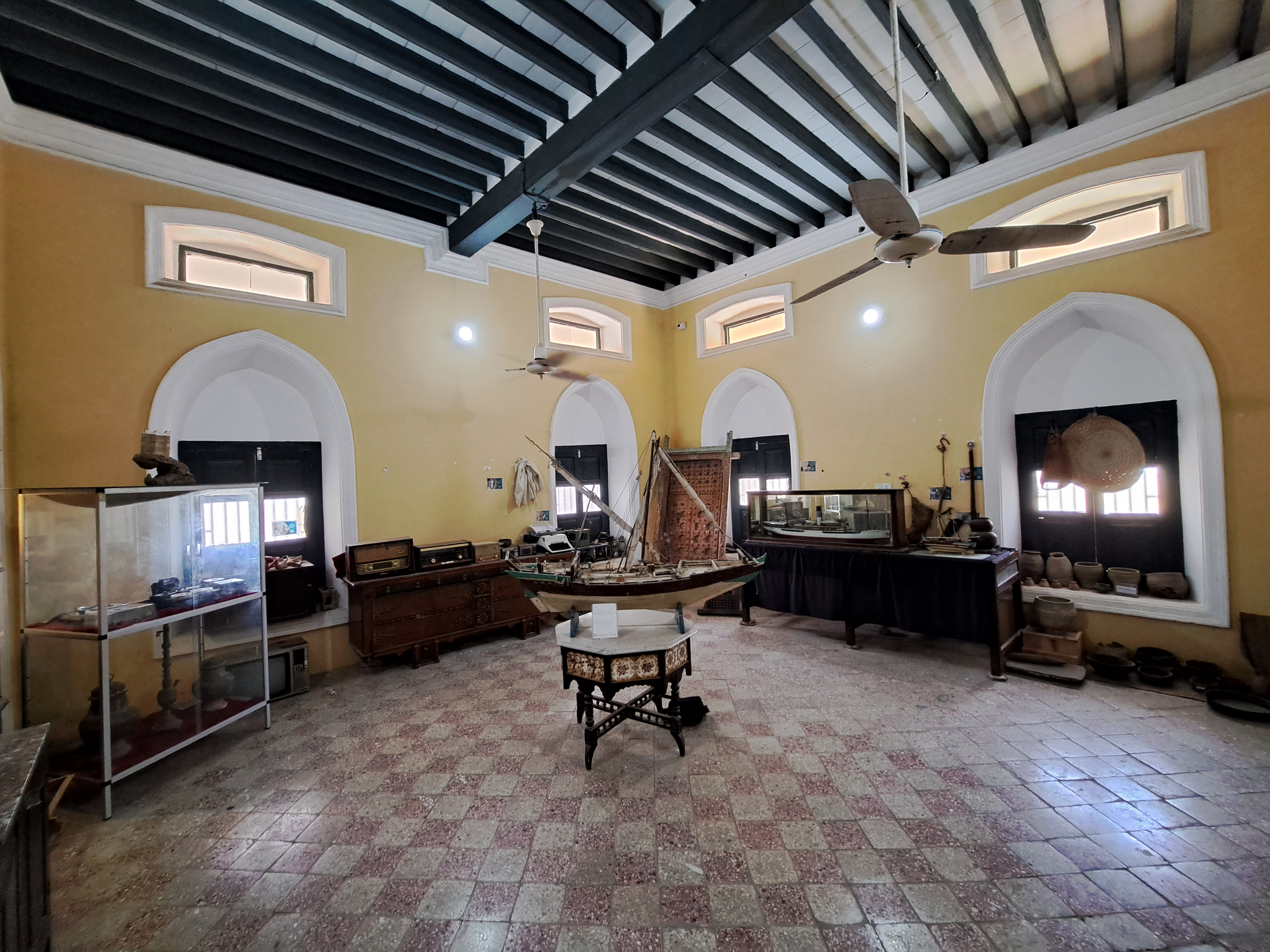

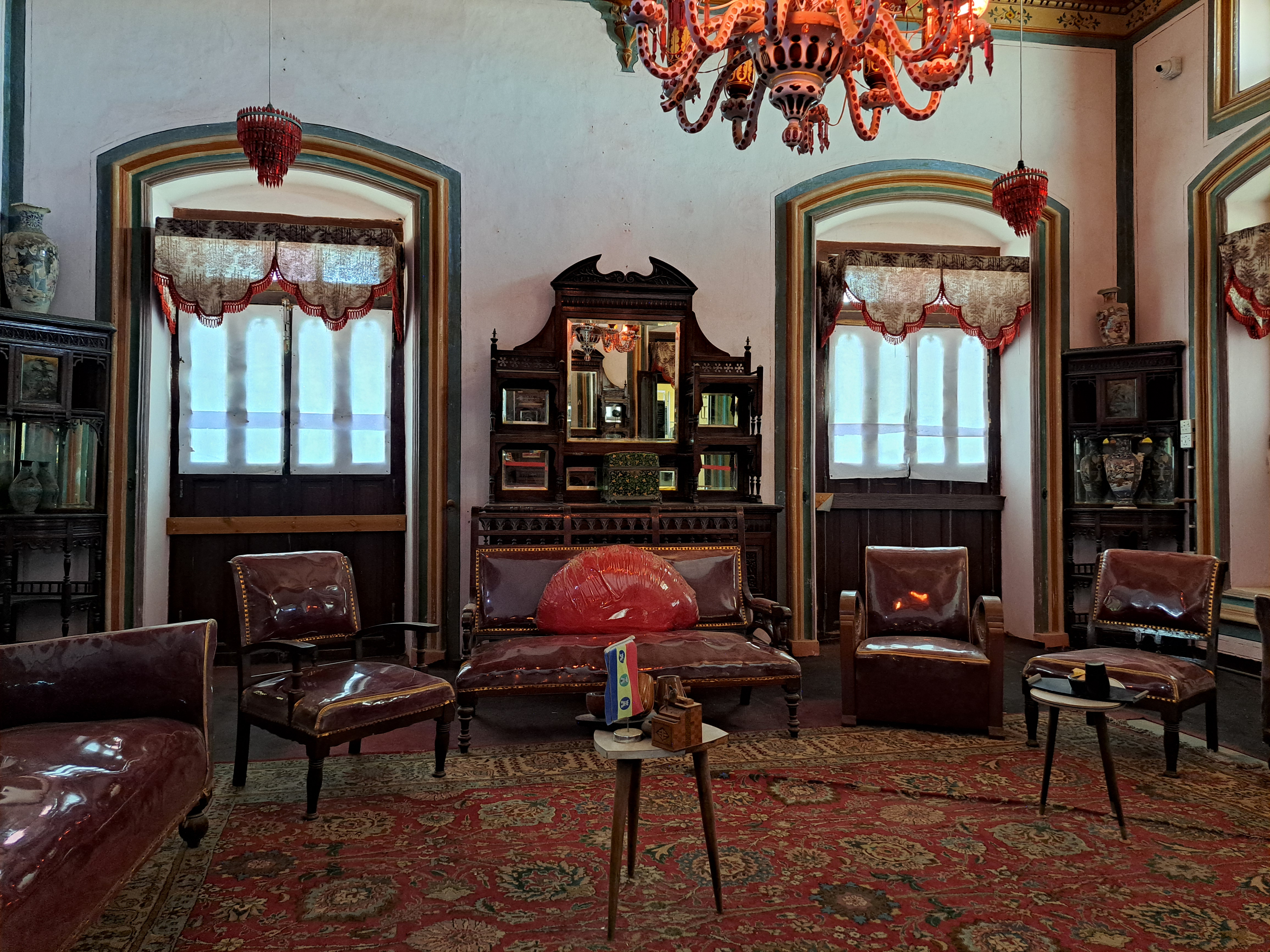

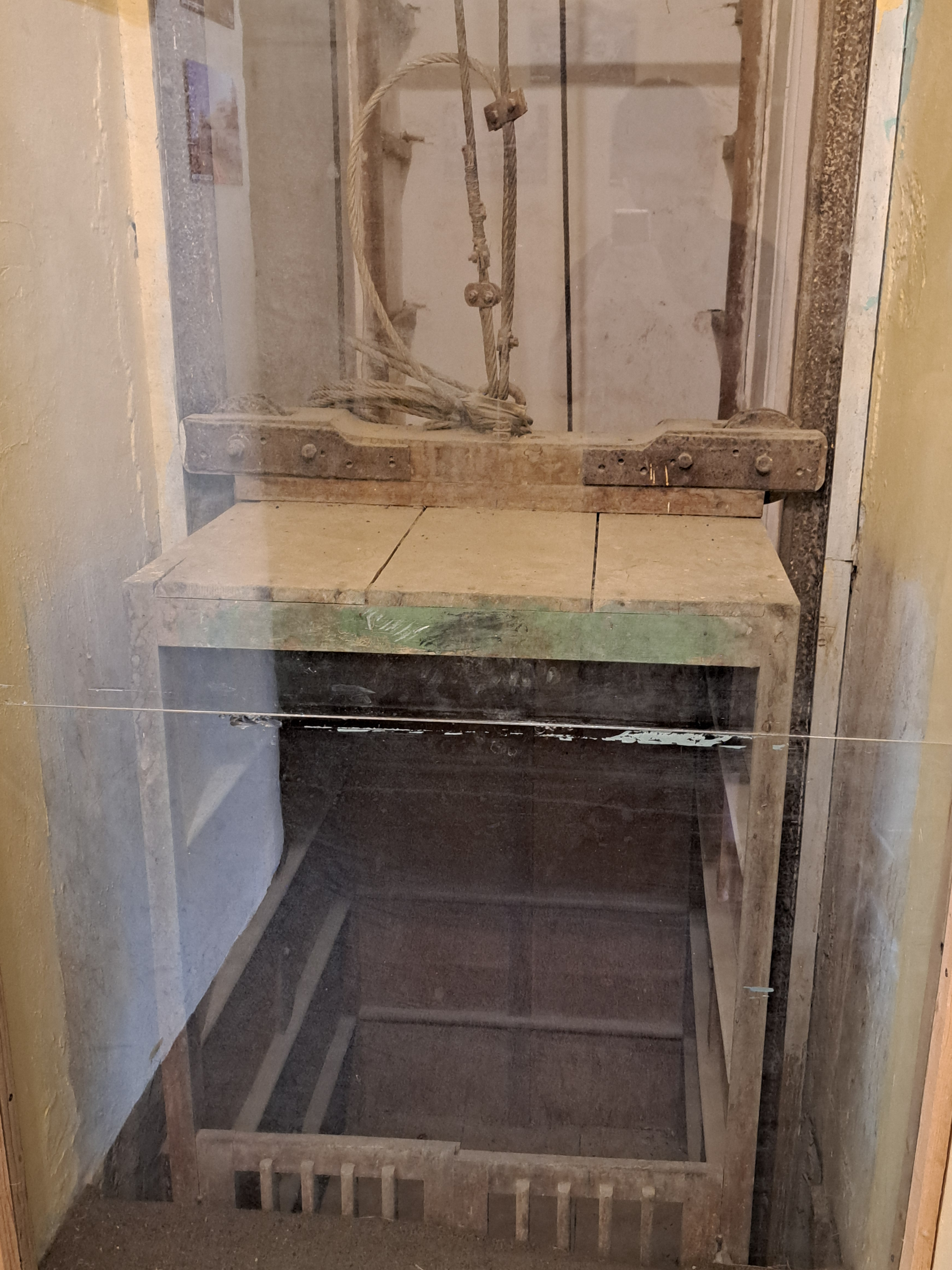

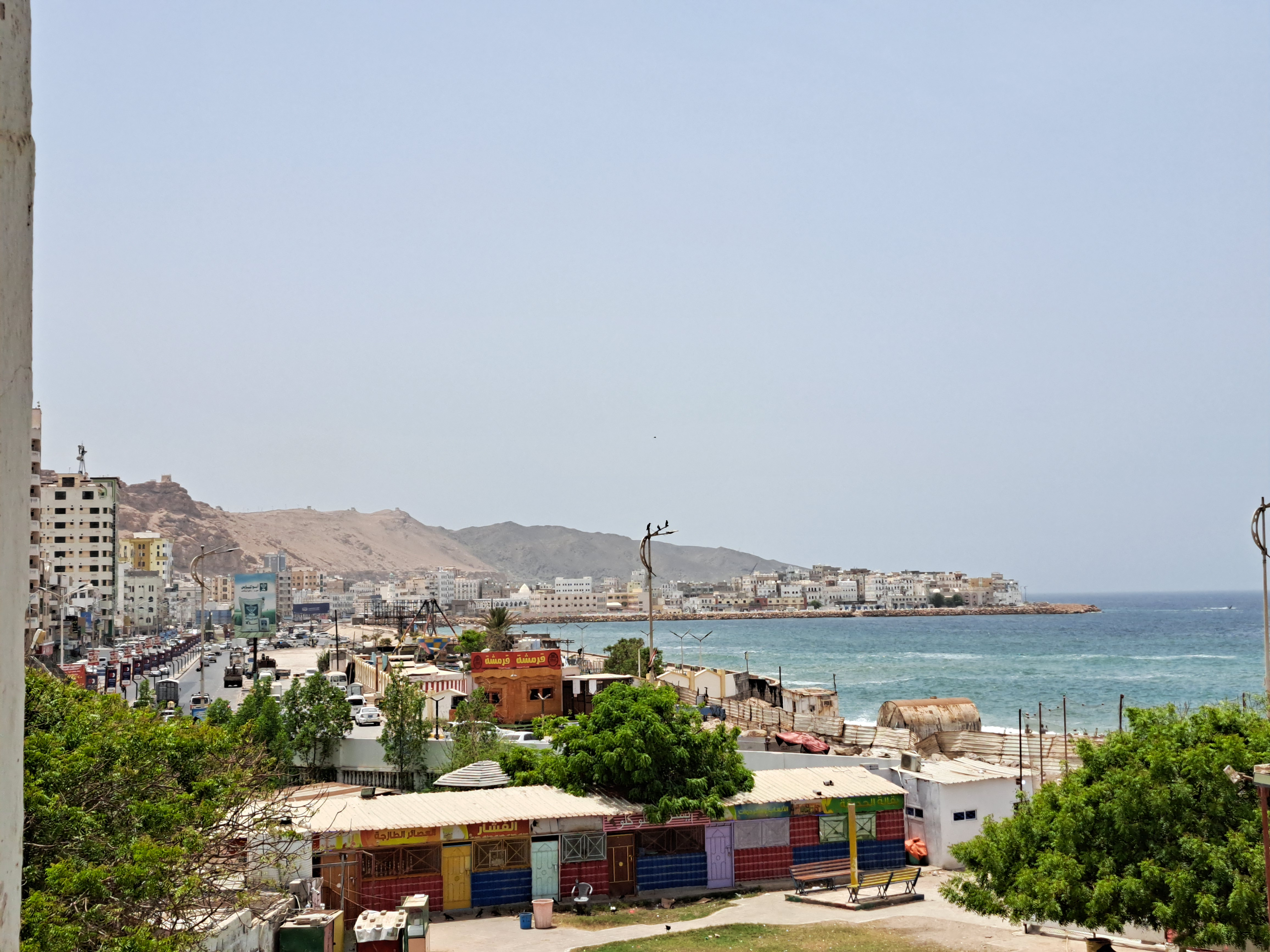

== See also ==
- Qu'aiti Sultanate
- Mukalla
- Yemen
