= Barbara Maxwell (producer) =

British television producer (1943–2025)

Barbara Maxwell

Barbara Maxwell (13 June 1943 – 3 January 2025) was a British television producer best known for her work on the BBC's political debate programme, Question Time, for which she was the founding producer. Her career in television and broadcasting spanned several decades.

== Early life and education ==
Barbara Anne Maxwell was born in Gloucester to Brian Maxwell and Anne (née Robertson), both doctors. Raised in Norwich, she attended Norwich High School for Girls before moving to Millfield School in Somerset. After being expelled for mischief, she finished her education at Sherborne School for Girls in Dorset. She went on to study English literature at Queen's University Belfast, where she became interested in political activism.

== Career ==
Maxwell joined the BBC as a secretary in the mid-1960s. At first, she worked as a junior member of the production team, covering major events such as the 1968 US Democratic Convention. Her outspoken response to the police brutality and violence against anti-Vietnam War protesters caught the attention of senior BBC journalists, including Charles Wheeler, which led to her role as a current affairs producer for the corporation. She went on to produce several key programmes, including 24 Hours and Tonight, as well as The Frost Interview with David Frost in 1974.

In 1979, Maxwell was tasked with producing the first episode of Question Time. The show was intended to be a temporary programme, but became a permanent feature of BBC politics programming. While working as a producer for Question Time, she clashed with Robin Day, who complained about Maxwell's choice of panellists, particularly those who were not members of the political establishment. Day also objected to Maxwell's decision to always include at least one woman on the panel.

In 1990, she was moved to cover political conference coverage for the BBC, a position she held until her retirement in 1993. She was moved there by John Birt; this was seen as a slight against Maxwell, whose individual style contrasted with Birt's managerialism. She later berated her bosses as "Stalinist pygmies", and complained about the new style of Question Time, which she said "lost its danger and its sparkle".

== Personal life ==
Maxwell's family home was in Donegal, Ireland.

She enjoyed art, literature, theatre and politics, and was a passionate supporter of Norwich City Football Club. She also enjoyed wild swimming.

In 1971, Maxwell married Brian Ash, a BBC reporter and presenter who later became a barrister. They had three children.

Maxwell was diagnosed with Parkinson's disease in her later years and died from complications of the illness on 3 January 2025, at the age of 81.
