= Tom Brock (cricketer) =

English cricketer (born 1994)

Personal information
- Full name: Thomas Michael J Brock
- Born: November 1994 (age 32); Yeovil, Somerset, England
- Batting: Right-handed
- Bowling: Right-arm medium

Domestic team information
- Years: Team
- 2017: Oxford University

Career statistics
Competition	First-class
Matches	1
Runs scored	2
Batting average	1.00
100s/50s	–/–
Top score	2
Balls bowled	228
Wickets	6
Bowling average	22.83
5 wickets in innings	–
10 wickets in match	–
Best bowling	3/61
Catches/stumpings	–/–
- Source: Cricinfo, 3 February 2020

Thomas Michael J Brock (born November 1994) is an English former first-class cricketer.

== Early life and career ==
Brock was born at Yeovil in November 1994. He was educated at Millfield before going up St Hilda's College, Oxford. While studying at Oxford, he made a single appearance in first-class cricket for Oxford University against Cambridge University at Fenner's in the 2017 University Match, taking figures of 3 for 61 in the Cambridge first-innings and 3 for 76 in their second-innings.
