= Ghalib II al-Qu'aiti =

Ghalib II al-Qu'aiti al-Hadhrami
- Sultan of Shihr and Mukalla
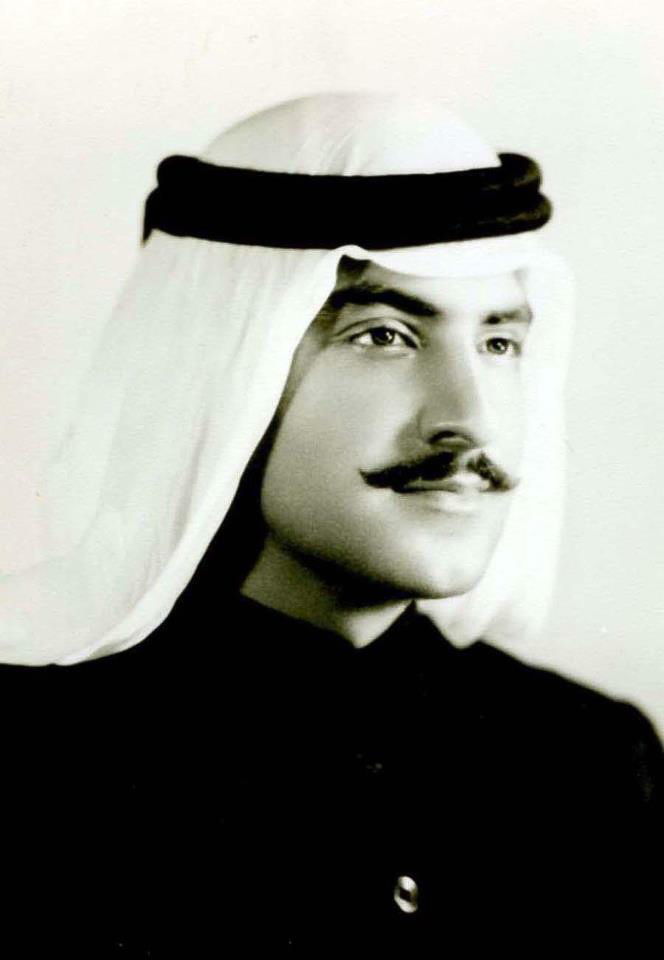
- Ghalib II in 1966
- Reign: October 10, 1966 – September 17, 1967
- Born: January 7, 1948 (age 78)
- Spouse: Sultana Rashid Ahmed
- Issue: Crown Prince Saleh bin Ghalib; Princess Fatima bint Ghalib; Princess Muzna bint Ghalib
- House: Al-Qu'aiti
- Father: Sultan Awadh bin Saleh

Sultan Ghalib II bin Awadh al-Qu'aiti al-Hadhrami (born 7 January 1948) is the former sultan of the Qu'aiti State or Qu'aiti Sultanate, in modern Yemen, and the current head of the Al-Qu'aiti household. The once ruling Qu’aiti dynasty of Hadhramaut was Yafa’i in origin. He reigned for less than a year, from 10 October 1966 until the monarchy was ousted by the National Liberation Front on 17 September 1967.

Sultan Ghalib was born in Secunderabad, Hyderabad State, and is the eldest son of his predecessor, Sultan Awadh bin Saleh. His official coronation took place on 1 December 1966 followed by another two days of state celebrations. This was followed by a week of public celebrations. After his forced abdication, Ghalib married Sultana Rashid Ahmed on 7 June 1975, with whom he has one son, Prince Saleh and two daughters, Princess Fatima and Princess Muzna.

Sultan Ghalib holds an MA from the University of Oxford in Oriental Studies (Islamic History) and another in Arabian Studies from the University of Cambridge, both with honours. The Sultan graduated from Millfield School. He has been a Saudi resident since 1968, currently residing in Jeddah. He has working knowledge of seven languages including Arabic, English, French, German, Persian, Turkish and Urdu/Hindi, which supports his research of various historical periods and geographic regions.

During his later years, he has authored a number of papers and books on Islam and Arab history, including The Holy Cities, the Pilgrimage and the World of Islam (2008).
