= Qu'aiti =

Former state in South Arabia

Coordinates: 14°35′N 49°05′E

Qu'aiti State of Shihr and Mukalla ٱلدَّوْلَة ٱلْقُعَيْطِيَّة فِي ٱلشِّحْر وَٱلْمُكَلَّا (Arabic)
- 1858–1967
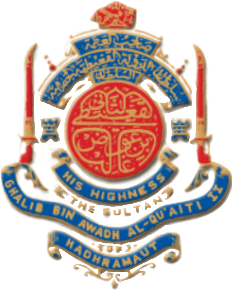
- Flag; (1939–1967); Wordmark; of Sultan Ghalib II; (1966–1967)
- Anthem: "شرف السلطان بشرى"; Sharaf al-Sultan Bushra; The Sultan honored us
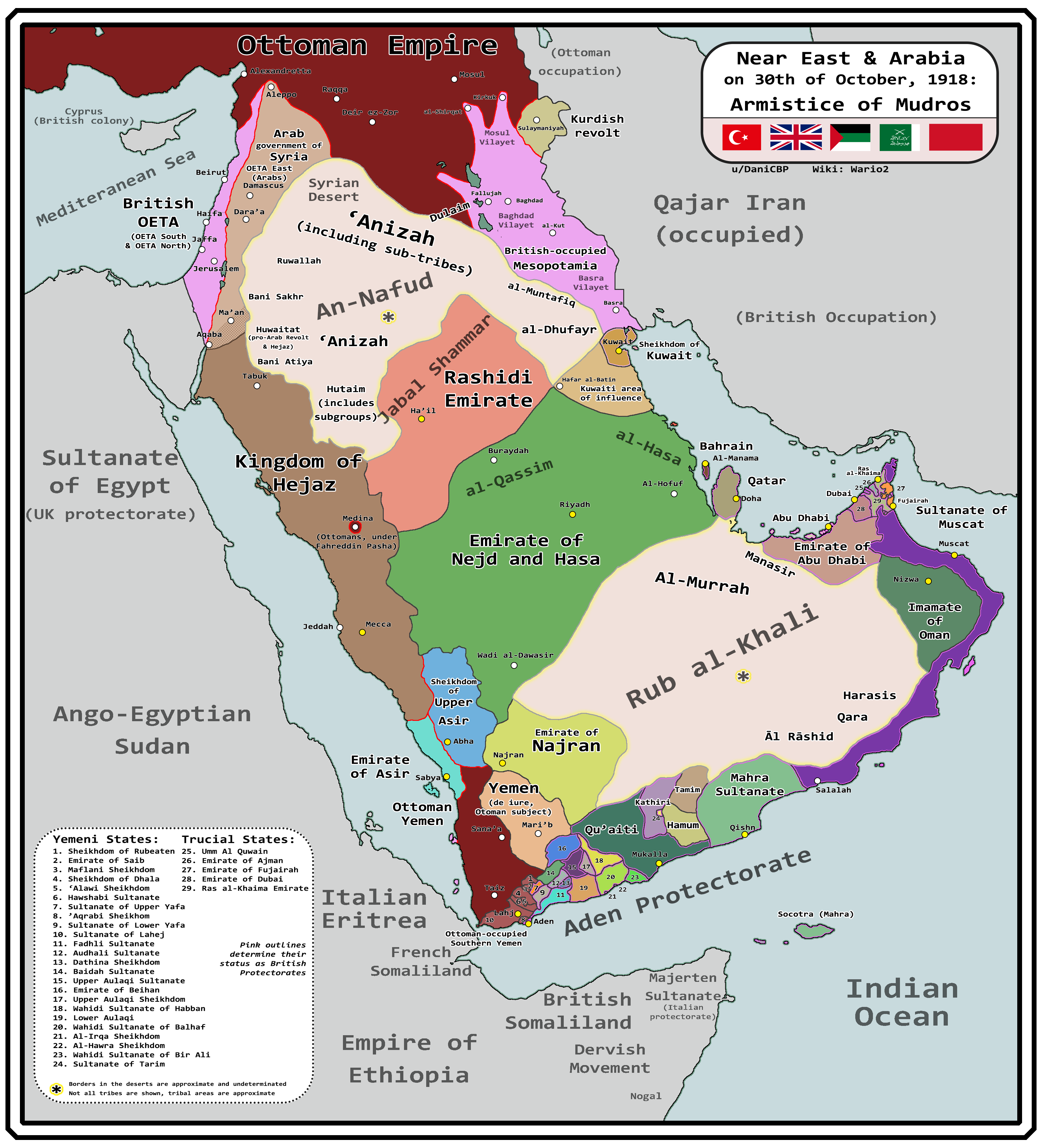
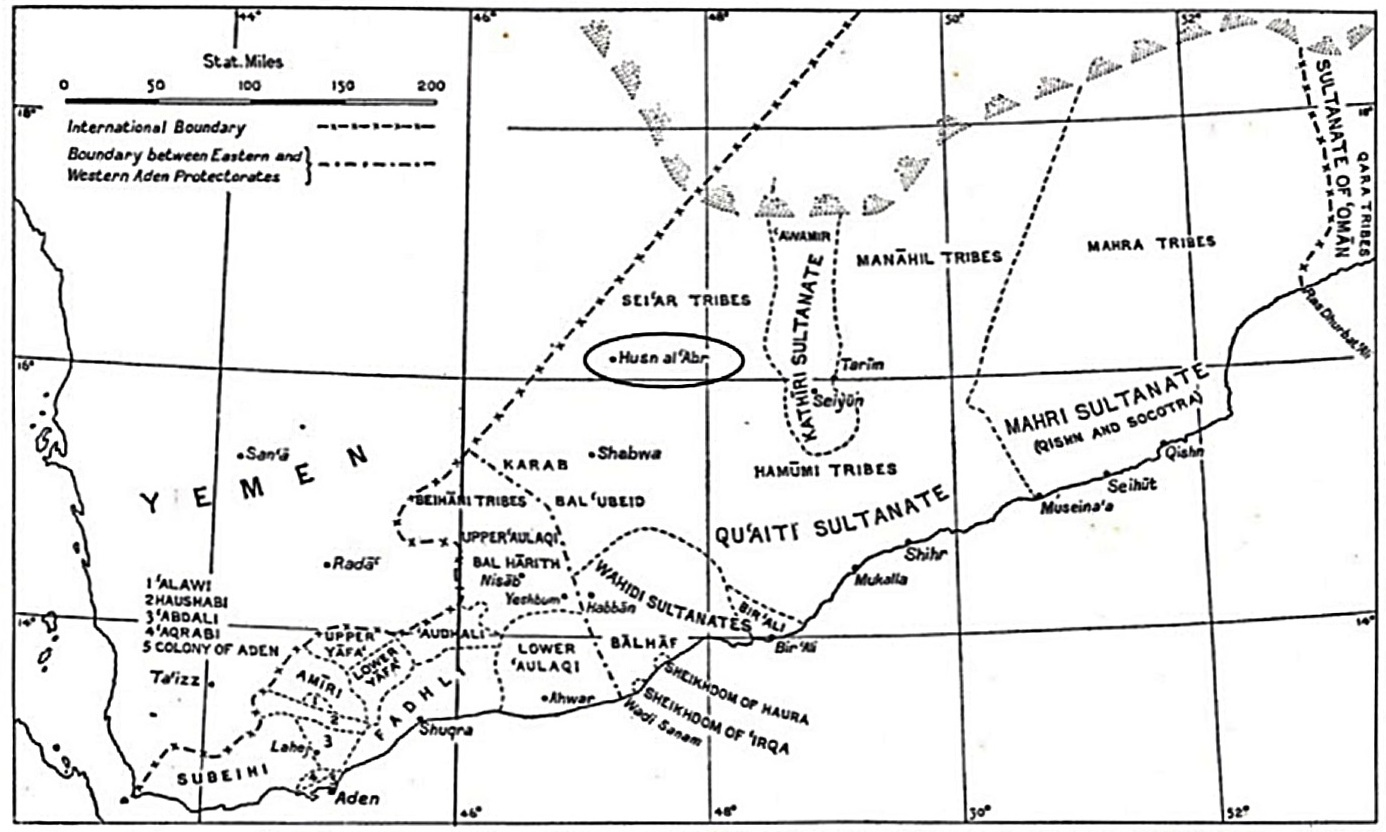
- Status: 1858–1888: Independent state 1888–1963: Part of the Aden Protectorate; 1963–1967: Part of the Protectorate of South Arabia
- Capital: Ash-Shihr (until 1915); Mukalla (from 1915)
- Government: Sultanate
- HH Sultan
  - 1850–1865: Jemadar/Sultan Abdullah bin Omar Al-Quaiti
  - 1865–1908: Awadh I bin Omar Al-Qu'aiti
  - 1908–1921: Ghalib I bin Awadh Al-Qu'aiti
  - 1921–1935: Omar bin Awadh Al-Qu'aiti
  - 1935–1955: Sir Saleh bin Ghalib Al-Qu'aiti KCMG
  - 1955–1966: Awadh II bin Saleh Al-Qu'aiti
  - 1966–1967 (deposed): Ghalib II bin Awadh Al-Qu'aiti
- Historical era: 19th and 20th centuries
  - Established: 1858
  - British protectorate: 1888
  - Disestablished: 30 November 1967
Preceded by	Succeeded by
Kathiri; Kassadi	South Yemen
- Today part of: Yemen; Saudi Arabia (al-Wadiah)

Qu'aiti, (Note: Arabic: ٱلسَّلْطَنَة ٱلْقُعَيْطِيَّة, romanized: al-Salṭanah al-Qʿayṭīyah) officially the Qu'aiti State of Shihr and Mukalla, (Note: Arabic: ٱلدَّوْلَة ٱلْقُعَيْطِيَّة فِي ٱلشِّحْر وَٱلْمُكَلَّا, romanized: Ad-Dawlah al-Qʿayṭīyah fī ash-Shiḥr wal-Mukallā) was a sultanate in the Hadhramaut region of South Arabia, in what is now Yemen. The Sultanate spanned the Indian Ocean coast up to the border of Mahra, encompassed the historic city of Shabwa, the central valleys and oasis settlements of Hadhramaut, and controlled the southern Empty Quarter. Its capital was Mukalla, and it was divided into six Banners (provinces), namely Mukalla, ash-Shihr, Shibam, Wadi Doan, the Western Province, and Hijr. Mukalla, ash-Shihr, and Shibam were the Sultanate's major cities.

== History ==
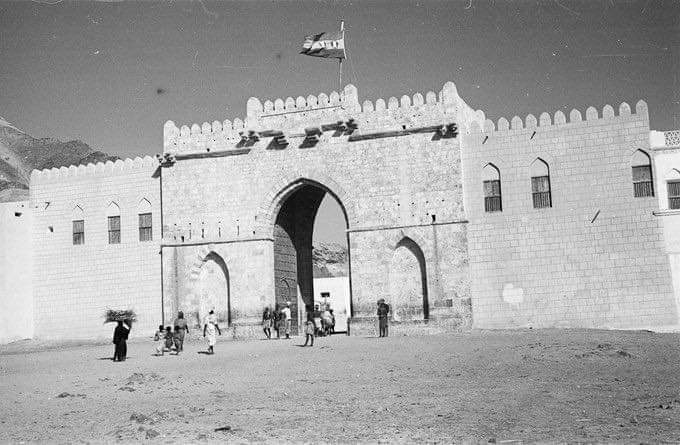
The Gate of Mukalla, the main gate of the capital city of Qu'aiti, 1949

Sons of Umar bin Awadh al-Qu'aiti, who became a jemadar in the forces of the Nizam of Hyderabad State (now in India), first took the town of Shibam from the rival Kathiris in 1858 to consolidate their rule over all of Hadhramaut.

In 1866, Sultan Ghalib bin Muhsin, Sheikh of the Kathiri, expelled Ali bin Naji from Shihr and took possession of the fort. At this time, the inland town of Shibam was held by the Qu'aiti tribe. Qu'aiti Sheikh, Abdulla, being apprehensive that the capture of Mukalla would follow that of Shihr and that his communication with the seaboard would be cut off, applied to his brothers, in the service of the Hyderabad State, for assistance against Sultan Ghalib bin Muhsin. A request was thereupon preferred by the Minister of the Nizam for the armed interference of the British Government on behalf of the rightful Jemadar of Shihr. The government, however, declined to interfere or to allow an armed expedition to be fitted out by Arabs from the Indian coast.

In April 1867, Awadh (Nawaz) bin Umar, better known by his Hyderabad title of Sultan Nawaz Jang, a brother of the Qu'aiti Jemadar Abdulla, after establishing a blockade on the sea-coast, landed near Shihr, attacked and put to flight Sultan Ghalib bin Muhsin, and established the authority of his brother as Jemadar of Shihr. An attempt was made by the Kathiri Sheikh in December of the same year to retake the place, but he was repulsed by the Qu'aiti, who have since remained in unmolested possession of the port and district. An application was made by the Kathiri Sheikh to the British Government for permission to recover Shihr by force, but it was considered undesirable to interfere. At the same time, the Nizam's Minister declared his readiness to prohibit any interference on the part of Hyderabad subjects in the affairs of Hadhramaut.

Salih bin Muhammad died in 1873, shortly after the conclusion of a treaty with him, by which he engaged for himself, his heirs, and successors, to prohibit the import or export of slaves to or from Mukalla and its dependencies. He was succeeded as Naqib by his son, Umar bin Salih, who accepted an offer by the Qu'aiti Jemadar of Shihr to aid him in reducing the refractory Sheikh of Doan. Taking advantage of his admission with 600 followers into the fort of Mukalla, the Qu'aiti Jemadar demanded payment of a debt alleged to have been due to him by the late Naqib. Finding himself powerless to resist this demand, the Naqib consented to a treaty under which he agreed to cede half of Mukalla, of Bandar Burum, and of the district of Al-Harshiyyat in return for a payment of 2.5 lakhs of dollars, from which, however, the debt due to the Qu'aiti Jemadar was to be deducted. But hostilities continued; the Naqib entered into an alliance with the Kathiri, and the Qu'aiti, with the aid of their relatives at Hyderabad, purchased a vessel and dispatched her to Aden. There she was detained under the provisions of the Foreign Enlistment Act of 1870, and not released until the Qu'aiti Jemadar had bound himself under a heavy penalty to send her at once to Bombay without touching at, or undertaking any operations against, any of the ports of Hadhramaut. He further attempted to establish a blockade of Mukalla and hoarded native craft suspected of being bound for that port. For the plunder of three such vessels, he was compelled to pay an indemnity of Rs. 6,142 and warned of the consequences of such interference with commerce in the future.

In 1873, an engagement was concluded with the Jemadar of Shihr, by which he bound himself, his heirs and successors, to prohibit the import or export of slaves to or from Shihr and its dependencies.

The British Government steadily avoided interference or arbitration in the disputes between the Naqib of Mukalla and the Jemadar of Shihr, and took no action regarding them beyond asking for assurances from the ministers of the Hyderabad State that persons in the service of the Nizam, who might be convicted of taking part in the quarrel by supplying money and munitions of war to their relatives on either side, and so prolonging the strife, would be dismissed. But at length, in 1876, there being no prospect of the cessation of hostilities without some authoritative interference, the Political Resident at Aden, acting under the authority of Government, visited the two chiefs, and through his mediation, a truce for two years was concluded, on the expiry of which period a further extension of one year was arranged. No permanent settlement was, however, effected, and eventually hostilities were resumed in 1880 and resulted in the capture of Burum by the Jemadar of Shihr. Being driven to extremities, the Naqib of Mukalla signed the agreements drawn up by the Political Resident, and Burum was evacuated by the Jemadar of Shihr.

Flag of Qu'aiti State (1880–1939)

No sooner was the Naqib thus relieved from immediate pressure than he repudiated the terms of the settlement. The Government of India thereupon directed that the Jemadar should be replaced in possession of Burum, which was surrendered by the Naqib without further bloodshed. Finally, in November 1881, the latter gave himself up to the Commander of H. M. S. Dragon and was conveyed with his dependents to Aden, while the Jemadar of Shihr was put in possession of Mukalla and its dependencies. From Aden, the Naqib went to Zanzibar with several Sheikhs and followers, and in 1888, he accepted the maintenance provided for him.

In 1882, an Engagement was concluded with the Jemadar of Shihr and Mukalla by which he became a British stipendiary, an allowance of 300 dollars a year being assigned to him, his heirs, and successors. At the same time, the Jemadar paid over a sum of 100,000 dollars to the Resident at Aden for the maintenance of the Naqib of Mukalla.

On 1 May 1888, a Protectorate Treaty was concluded with the Jemadar Abdulla bin Umar and his brother Awadh bin Umar.

Jemadar Abdulla bin Umar died on 25 November 1888, and the Government sanctioned the continuance of the salute and stipend to his brother Awadh bin Umar (Sultan Nawaz Jang).

In 1896, a quarrel took place between Jemadar Awadh bin Umar and his nephews, Husein and Munassar, over their right of succession and the division of their property. In September 1901, the Resident tried to bring about a settlement, but failed. A further conference at Aden in February 1902 was no more successful. Jemadar Awadh bin Umar went to India to lay his petition before the Viceroy, while his nephews returned to Shihr after signing a pledge not to interfere with the administration of their country. The agreement was broken, and in June, the Resident, accompanied by Jemadar Awadh bin Umar, went to Shihr with an armed force. Husein submitted and was brought to Aden, Munassar following him shortly afterwards.

The settlement of the dispute between Awadh bin Umar and his nephews was then submitted to arbitration, which resulted in the award of a large sum of money to Husein and Munassar and their families. They, however, refused to accept the award and in July 1904 left for India, and so far (December 1930) the dispute about the nephews’ Trust money has not been settled.

In 1902, a permanent salute of 9 guns was sanctioned for the Jemadar of Shihr and Mukalla, and his title was changed from Jemadar to Sultan.

At the end of 1904, the Sultan purchased a share in the port of Balahaf from the Wahidi Sultan Salih bin Abdulla, but the Government refused to sanction the agreement.

In 1906, the Sultan's nephew Munassar, writing to report the death of his brother Husein, unsuccessfully endeavoured to re-open the question of his differences with the Sultan.

In the Qaiti-Wahidi Agreement of 1910, the Wahidi Sultan allowed passage through his territory to the Sultan of Shihr and Mukalla.

In December 1910, Sultan Awadh bin Umar died, leaving a will nominating his oldest son Ghalib as his successor and directing that Ghalib's successor was to be his brother Umar bin Awadh, to whom Ghalib bin Awadh's son Salih has to succeed, and so on, the succession alternating between the families of his two sons Ghalib bin Awadh and Umar bin Awadh. Under the terms of this will Ghalib succeeded as Sultan of Shihr and Mukalla, and the stipend paid to his father was continued to him.

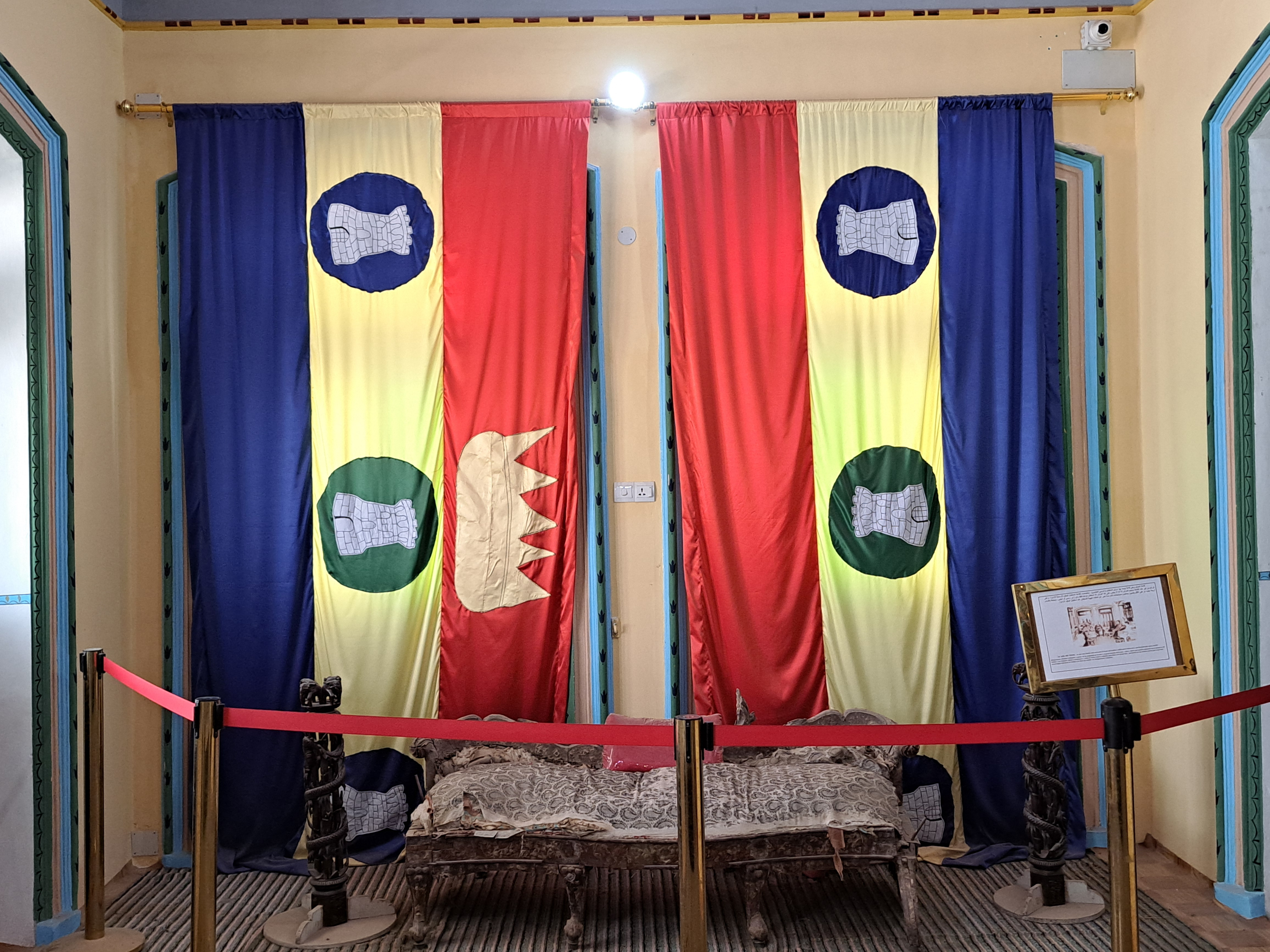
State (left) and Civil (right) flags of the Quaiti sultanate, along with the Quaiti Throne

In 1916, the Sultan sent to Aden his minister Khan Bahadur Sayyid Husein bin Hamid el Mehdar to discuss the question of his suzerainty over the Hadhramaut. Sayyid Husein produced a draft agreement regarding the future status and administration of Balahaf and the other Wahidi territories, which the Sultan proposed to sign with the Sultan of Balahaf and his brothers, subject to the approval of the Government. Sayyid Husein asserted that the Sultan had concluded agreements with certain tribes of the Hadhramaut, of which he was anxious to obtain Government recognition, and asked that, in the event of this being accorded, the tribes should not be allowed direct intercourse with the Aden Residency. The Government of India explained that, though they had no desire to raise any objection to the agreement which the Sultan had arrived at with Sultan Muhsin and his brothers, they preferred to defer their decision about this, as well as the other agreements with the inland tribes, until normal conditions were established.

Sultan Ghalib died at Hyderabad in June 1922, leaving a will by which he nominated his son Salih as his successor.

Salih at first claimed the succession, but finally came to an agreement with his uncle following the terms of his grandfather's will by which Umar bin Awadh was to succeed as Sultan of ash-Shihr and Mukalla while acknowledging Salih bin Ghalib as his heir.

In 1923, the succession of Sultan Umar was recognized by the British government, and the payment of ahly stipend of $ 30 was continued to him. In the same year, he was granted a personal salute of 11 guns.

In 1931, the Sultan's tribesmen, including Bedouins, numbered about 60,000, and his gross annual revenue was estimated at Rs. 6,25,000.

Scenes from Mukalla and Wadi Hadhramaut in 1966–1967, before the independence of South Yemen

As Great Britain planned for the eventual independence of South Arabia in the 1960s, Qu'aitis declined to join the British-sponsored Federation of South Arabia but remained under British protection as part of the Protectorate of South Arabia. Despite promises of a UN referendum to assist in determining the future of the Qu'aiti State in South Arabia on 17 September 1967, communist forces overran the kingdom and, in November of that year, the Qu'aiti State was integrated into South Yemen. South Yemen later united with North Yemen in 1990 to become the Republic of Yemen.

== Economy ==
The ports, exposed to the winds of the monsoon, were involved in coastal and long-distance trade. Agriculture is completely restricted to the wadis, where irrigation is possible, as the annual rainfall of 50-100 mm is insufficient. Plagues of locusts endanger the harvests. Small quantities of frankincense could be harvested along the coastal strip.

Tobacco grew at Ġail Bār Wazīr. The Bedouins (Hamumi nomads) organized the camel caravans that brought imports, mainly rice, dates, tea, fabrics, and wood, from the coast to the hinterland. Exports from the hinterland were almost exclusively limited to hides. For a long time, raiding was also an important source of income for the tribes, which is why residential buildings were usually built like fortresses, sometimes surrounded by ditches, in places that were difficult to access. Around a quarter of the population lived on the coast. The population of Mukalla was estimated at 16,000 in 1940, rising to 35,000 in the next decade as a result of the famine inland. Fishing and the construction of dams were important industries there. The Pan-American International Oil Company, a subsidiary of Standard Oil of Indiana (later: AMOCO), was granted a concession in 1961.

Due to the hostile conditions, emigration was frequent, initially to the Mughal Empire, where Arabs were valued as mercenaries. Emigration increased from 1890, but since 1870, armed men were no longer allowed to enter British India. A diaspora formed, mostly merchants, mainly in island India and to a lesser extent in East Africa, numbering around 100,000 people in the 1930s (70,000 of them in Java).

=== Infrastructure ===
In 1937, a road, practically the only one suitable for motor traffic, was built from Shihr over 250 km from Taballa to Tarim in the interior of the Hadhramaut; it runs through the territory of the Kathiri, among others. The road was financed solely by the Singapore-based emigrant family al-Kaff. It was extended to the west to Shabwa at the western end of the Wadi Hadhramaut. A second road was built from Mukalla to al-Qatn through the Wadi Doan. During the Second World War, further roads were built so that the coast from Aden to Raidat al-Abd al-Wadud could be traveled. The RAF established around 35 landing sites; they were primarily used to control and intimidate the tribes.

There was no railroad, but electricity had been available in Mukalla since 1938. A state primary school system, based on Western principles, was built up from 1937, initially on the coast. After the war, 12 to 15 new schools were opened each year, many of the teachers came from Sudan and Jordan.

=== Currency ===
The Maria Theresa thaler was the preferred currency for transactions. The Indian rupee, which was also the unit of account for the national budget, was increasingly in circulation, especially on the coast. It was replaced by the East African shilling in 1951, which was followed by the South Arabian dinar in 1965.

== Military ==
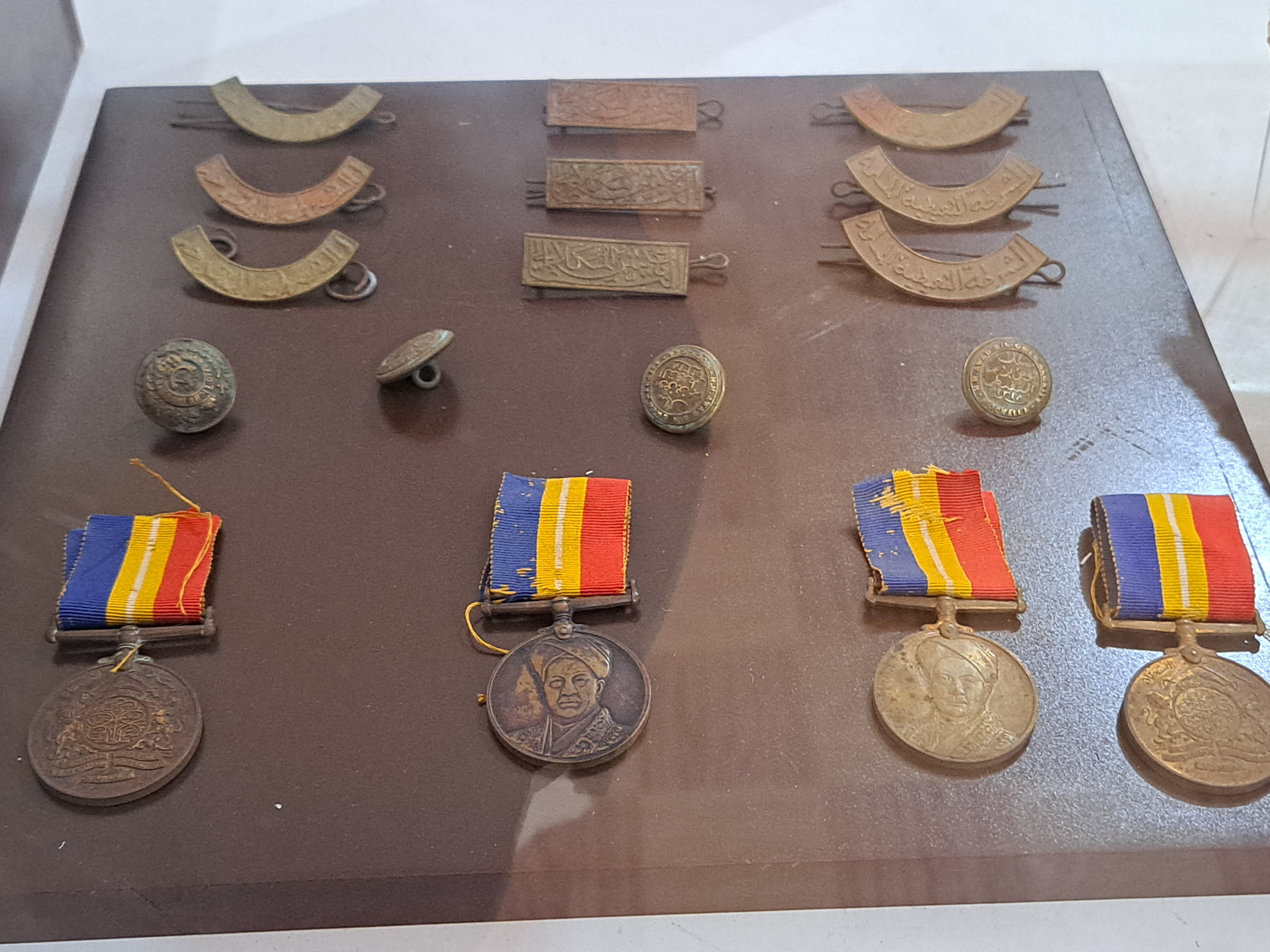
Medals and Orders of the Quaiti Sultanate

Before the enforcement of a land peace in 1937, every man was armed, even if mostly only with muskets. Small wars between villages and blood feuds were fought among the clans of the hinterland. There was an unreliable constabulary, known by the colonial rulers as the Yafa'i Irregulars, which was deployed in the inland villages.

From 1939, the Sultan established the Mukalla Regular Army, initially with 400 men and Indian instructors, which was recruited from Bedouins and members of the Abīd class. Initially they lived in the capital's bazaar, and it was not until 1940 that barracks were built. From the 1950s, there were attempts to unite the force with the Aden Protectorate Levies, which initially did not take place for political reasons. In 1965, the troops numbered around 3000 and from 1963 to 1967 they supported the troops of the colonial rulers in the bloody suppression of the nationalist freedom fighters.

The Hadhrami Bedouin Legion was founded in 1938 based on the model of the Transjordanian Arab Legion. Glubb Pasha provided the first officers, who initially led the 50 men with a dozen camels. Muslim Indian officers from the Punjab later acted as instructors. By the end of the war, the strength of this armed police force had risen to 170 men, who were distributed among smaller forts.

== National Anthem ==
"Sharaf al-Sultan Bushra"
Arabic	English Translation	Romanization
شرّف السلطان بشرى; بقدومٍ كالغمام; ولنا عزٌّ وفخرٌ; كان هذا والسلام	The Sultan honored us; With an arrival like a cloud, And we are honored and proud, That was it, and peace be upon you	Sharrafa al-Sultan Bushra, Bequdoomen kal-Ghamamu, Lana ‘ezzun wa fakhrun, Kana hadha wa al-Salaam

== See also ==
- Qu'aiti Sultan Palace
- Hadhramaut
- Aden Protectorate
- List of Sunni Muslim dynasties

== Annexes ==
=== Qu'aiti State postage stamps ===
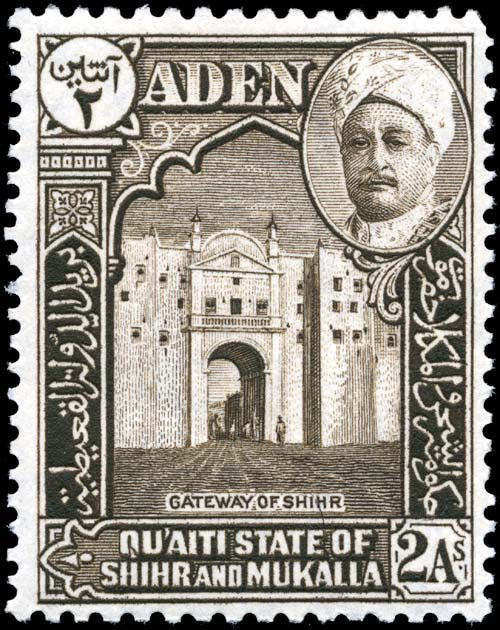
1942 stamp depicting Sultan Saleh and the city gate of Ash Shihr

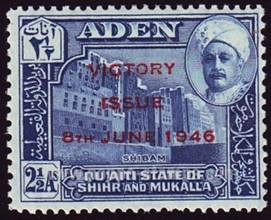
1946 Victory issue

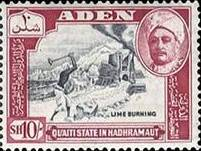
1955 stamp depicting Sultan Saleh and lime burning
