= Simon Beck (artist) =

British snow artist

- Simon Beck at work in Les Arcs in 2012
- Born: 1958 (age 67–68); London, UK
- Education: University of Oxford
- Known for: Snow drawings and sculptures

Simon Beck (born 1958) is a British snow artist and a former cartographer. Referred to as the world's first snow artist, he is primarily known for his landscape drawings and sculptures created from snow and sand. His work appeared in new media after he completed installations at Banff National Park in Alberta and Powder Mountain, Utah. He later participated in Minnesota's annual snow festival, "The Great Northern".

== Biography ==
He was born in 1958 in London and later moved to the French Alps. He originally started his career in 2004. He obtained his civil engineering degree from Oxford University, and later worked as a cartographer, leaving cartography around 2009 and started to make large-scale snow drawings. He creates about thirty drawings every winter, primarily in the Alps. He creates artwork by walking over a mile on snowshoes which continues for around ten hours. Sometimes, he walks about 30 miles to complete a single work in snow and uses a compass to complete geometrical snow designs.

He has created about 330 drawings of snow and 120 of sand as of 2020. Some of his artwork has been commissioned by organizations or art societies around the world. In 2016, a short documentary titled Simon Beck – Snowartist was created which revolves around his artwork. The film first appeared during a short film showcase of the National Geographic.
