= Nick Monu =

Nigerian dramatist, actor and director (born 1965)

Nicholas Monu
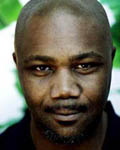
- Vienna 2005
- Born: Ononuju Babatunde Nicholas Monu; 25 March 1965 (age 61); Lagos, Nigeria
- Education: A.U. and Webber Douglas
- Known for: Director and actor
- Spouse: Simone Monu
- Website: www.nickmonu.com

Nick Monu (born 25 March 1965) is a Nigerian dramatist, actor and director.

== Life ==
Nicholas Monu was born as the fourth child and second son of the Monu prince of Asaba, Obiora Monu, accountant and CEO of Obiora Monu & Co. in Lagos, and Mrs. Florence Monu (née Oluwo), teacher at the Corona School in Lagos. He spent his first childhood years in Nigeria, until he and his family left the country owing to the Biafran War. For a short while, the family lived with an uncle who was at that time the designated Nigerian ambassador to Germany and thereafter Italy. Later he attended St. Andrew's School in Eastbourne and Millfield Senior School in Somerset. Besides an elite European education, he was educated in singing, sport and arts.

After having attended American University in Washington, D.C., and Webber Douglas Academy of Dramatic Art in London from 1987 to 1989, he was chosen together with another 11 English-speaking drama students to play the lead part in Anton Tschechow’s theatre play "Uncle wanja" at the Moscow Art Theatre in Russia.

Thereafter he started his career in the UK as a freelance actor, appearing in productions like The Wind in the Willows 1990 to 2011 at the Royal National Theatre, Talking in Tongues 1991 to 1992 at the Royal Court Theatre and Blues for Mr. Charlie 1992 to 1993 at the Manchester Royal Exchange. Between 1994 and 1997 he became a member of the Berlin Schaubühne Ensemble and played leadparts, for example in "Hotel Orpheu", "Orestes", "Symposium" and "Die Sprache der Vögel".

1998 he returned for a short while to London and played lead parts in the theatre productions "Oroonoko" at the Royal Shakespeare Company, The honest whore and Merchant of Venice at the Globe Theatre and started his film and television career. He starred in the BBC's EastEnders, Holby City, T.L.C., The Whistle Blower and the films Stigma and White Hawk.

2001 he started with a series of performances in the opera Entführung aus dem Serail at the Wiener Volksoper as “Bassa Selim”. In 2002 he moved between Vienna and London, starring as "Othello" and "King Headley" at the Tricycle Theatre. In 2003 he joined the Ensemble of the Wiener Burgtheater and starred in productions like "Was Ihr wollt", "7 Sekunden oder in God we Trust", "Die Ziege", "Don Carlos", "Die Katze auf dem heißen Blechdach" and "Sofasurfin". 2006 he appeared once again as "Bassa Selim" at the Opera de Marseille, marking his first stage début in France.

Since 2004 Monu has appeared in many German-speaking cinema and film productions, for example in 2004 in "Vier Frauen und ein Todesfall", in 2005 in "Gefangene", 2006 in the Tatort-series "Schattenspiele" and "Tod aus Afrika" as well as in "Kommissarin Lucas – German Angst", in 2007 in "Nachtschicht – Blutige Stadt" and "KDD – Scham" and in 2010 in "The Unintentional Kidnapping of Mrs. Elfriede Ott".

2007 he starred as Othello at the Salisbury Playhouse. Between 2008 and 2013 he travelled to Lagos in order to work on several productions, educating and training people working in these areas. The Austrian base NGO "Friends of Monu & Monu" is the European counterpart, providing support for the artistic projects in [[w: African Africa]]. Nick Monu is the chairman of this NGO, with Roman Bönsch as secretary and Simone Monu as treasurer.

As a producer and director he was involved in "Sonette XCIV" by William Shakespeare, starring Sir Alan Bates in 1999, shortfilm "Split Ends" – Cruzon Cinema, Soho, 2002, as well as the short "Wienerin betet" for the Festival Mythos Modern, Vienna, 2008; in 2009 he directed "Swamp Dwellers" by Wole Soyinka, National Theatre of Nigeria, and started producing music videos and held training workshops together with the Goethe-Institut Lagos called "Bauprobe" based on Wole Soyinka's "A dance of the Forest".

2010 he starred as the lead part in Christian Kracht's "Ich werde hier sein im Sonnenschein und im Schatten" at the Theater Basel, and appeared in the Alexanderfest at Augusta Raurica as Zeus.

2011 he directed "The Cost of Living" by Sefi Atta as a world première at Terra Kulture / Lagos, which was invited by Wole Soyinka to showcase at the Black Heritage Festival in April of the same year. In October 2011 he directed the world premier of "Hagel auf Zamfara" (English: The Sentence) by the same author, Sefi Atta, a Nigerian play translated into German, at the Theater Krefeld und Mönchengladbach.

In spring 2013 he directed another play in Germany, "Happy days" by Samuel Beckett, at the Theater Krefeld und Mönchengladbach, with its opening in April 2013. Thereafter he became the curator of the established African Art Gallery matombo in the old town of Salzburg, where he has curated shows of traditional and modern African Art. 2015 he held a reading based on Opera Wonyosi of Wole Soyinka as part of the opening of the Salzburger Festspiele within the gallery. In 2019 the African Art Gallery was redesigned and transferred into an online Gallery www.matombo.at

In January 2016 he had his debut at the Thalia Theatre in Hamburg, playing Father Joad in the stage adaption of John Steinbeck's novel Grapes of Wrath, directed by Luk Perceval.

From 2017 to 2020 he starred in several Austrian, Swiss and German Cinema and TV Films and played a supporting lead character in the first Austrian CiFi Movie RUBINKON in 2020, which was released in 2022.

Since 2017 he has supported Actors as an Acting Coach in Nigeria, with the Film Eyimofe winning several international film prices and a showcase at the Berlinale in 2020.

In 2021 he starred as Othello at the Landestheater Niederösterreich and played Iason in Medea at the Grand Theatre in Luxemburg in early 2022.

Since 2005 he is married to the Austrian designer Simone Monu and has three children.

== Filmography ==
- The Unintentional Kidnapping of Mrs. Elfriede Ott (Dor Film, 2010), as Malou
- Nachtschicht: "Blutige Stadtt" (Network Movie, 2007)
- KDD: "Scham" (Hofmann & Voges / ZDF, 2008), as David Kwahne
- Kommissarin Lucas: "German Angst" (Olga Film / ZDF, 2007), as Chris Arano
- Tatort: "Schattenspiele" (Studio Hamburg, 2006), as Jonathan Waputo
- Tatort: "Ein Tod aus Afrika" (Satel Film / ORF, 2006), as Farah
- Gefangene (Tagtraum / ZDF, 2005), as Moussa
- Vier Frauen und ein Todesfall: "Künstlerpech" (Dor Film / ORF, 2004), as Maurice Videre
- Doctors: "Shattered Dreams" (BBC, 2003), as Simon Dunning
- EastEnders (BBC, 2003), as Dr. Murray
- Holby City: "Facing Facts" (BBC, 2002), as Howard Lewis
- Monarch of the Glen (2001), as D.C. West
- The Glass – 4 Episodes (2001), as Ray Collins
- Peak Practice: "Walls of Jericho" (Central Television (2000), as Tyrone Wells
- The Whistle-Blower (BBC, 2000), as Tony Shiner
- Stigma (Maverick Films, 1998, short), as Thierry Masart
- All Our Sins Remembered… (Polite Films, 1997, short), as Jack Whitehawk
- After The Wax (dir. Chaz Maviyane-Davies, 1992, short)
- Lead parts in different TV series like The Bill, EastEnders, Screen One (Black and Blue), The Professionals, Boon 1989–97

== Awards ==
- 2011 Lagos Heritage Festival - Best Nigerian Theatre Play - THE COST OF LIVING
- 1990 he won the Evening Standard Award for the play Talking in Tongues at the Royal Court Theatre and was nominated as best actor in a supporting role.
- 1993 the film After the Wax won at the South African Film Festivals in Harare prices for best director and best short film.
