= Any Answers? =

- Running time: 45 mins
- Country of origin: United Kingdom
- Language: English
- Home station: BBC Light Programme (1954–1967); BBC Radio 2 (1967–1970); BBC Radio 4 (1970–present)
- Hosted by: Anita Anand
- Original release: October 1954
- Website: Website

Any Answers? is a radio phone-in broadcast on BBC Radio 4. It is the companion programme to Any Questions?, in which a panel of notable figures drawn from politics, media or business are asked for their views on current affairs by members of an invited audience assembled in a public venue.

Any Answers? is broadcast on Saturday afternoons on BBC Radio 4, immediately after the repeat edition of Any Questions? has been aired.

== History ==
The programme began in October 1954. It was originally based on letters from listeners to Any Questions? but has subsequently followed the trend to the more immediate "phone-in" format. Currently listeners can submit their responses to the views expressed in Any Questions? by email, text message, or telephone. A moderator hosts the programme, ensuring that sufficient time is devoted to responses to each issue covered.

Any Answers? was initially part of the schedule of the BBC Light Programme (which became BBC Radio 2 in September 1967), before moving to BBC Radio 4 in 1970. Its first presenter was Freddie Grisewood. Jonathan Dimbleby began hosting the programme in 1989. He stepped down in 2012 but continued to present Any Questions? until 2019. Anita Anand took over as host on 9 June 2012.

As of April 2023, Any Answers? is produced from BBC Cymru Wales New Broadcasting House in Cardiff.
