= Manuel III of Kongo =

Last ruler of the Kingdom of Kongo (r. 1911–1914)

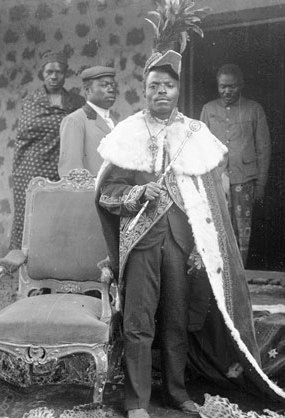
- Manuel circa 1912

King of Kongo
- Reign: 1911 – 1914
- Predecessor: Manuel Nkomba of Kongo
- Successor: Monarchy abolished
- Born: 1872
- Died: 1927 (aged 54–55)
- Father: Pedro VI of Kongo

Manuel III Afonso of Kongo, previously Manuel Martins Kiditu (1872 – 1927), was the last Manikongo (ruler) of the Kingdom of Kongo, ruling as a vassal of the Portuguese Empire from 1911 to 1914.

== Biography ==
Manuel was educated at Portuguese schools in Luanda and Huila. In 1893, he was hired as a page for Álvaro XIV of Kongo. He worked as an interpreter before settling in São Salvador in 1909. The royal family of Kongo chose him as ruler in 1911, on the death of Manuel Nkomba of Kongo. He was later described as "wise in the ways and customs of white men".

Manuel's reign over the reduced territory of the kingdom involved active collaboration with the Portuguese regime, including support for harsh contract labor imposed on the Kongolese people. As a result, in 1913, a massive, popular anti-colonial uprising broke out, led by Álvaro Buta. The rebellion was crushed by the Portuguese, who thereafter abolished the kingdom and assimilated the kingdom into the colony of Angola.

By 1915, Manuel also lost much of his claim to the throne, as the royal family recognized Álvaro XV Afonso Nzinga as ruler instead. Manuel died of tuberculosis in 1927.

Preceded by Manuel Nkomba of Kongo	Manikongo; 1911 to 1914	Succeeded by Monarchy abolished
