= Hereditary title =

Subclass of noble titles

Hereditary titles, in a general sense, are nobility titles, positions or styles that are hereditary and thus tend or are bound to remain in particular families.

Though both monarchs and nobles usually inherit their titles, the mechanisms often differ, even in the same country. The British crown has been inheritable by women since the medieval era (in the absence of brothers), while the vast majority of hereditary noble titles granted by British sovereigns are not inheritable by daughters.

== Gender preference ==
Often a hereditary title is inherited only by the legitimate, eldest son of the original grantee or that son's male heir according to masculine primogeniture. In some countries and some families, titles descended to all children of the grantee equally, as well as to all of that grantee's remoter descendants, male and female. This practice was common in the Kalmar Union, and was frequently the case in the letters patent issued by King Eric of Pomerania, King Joseph Bonaparte conferred the title "Prince of Naples" and later "Prince of Spain" on his children and grandchildren in the male and female line.

Historically, females have much less frequently been granted noble titles and, still more rarely, hereditary titles. However it was not uncommon for a female to inherit a noble title if she survived all kinsmen descended patrilineally from the original grantee or, in Scotland, Spain, Portugal, and parts of England, if she survived just her own brothers and their descendants. Rarely, a noble title descends to the eldest child regardless of gender (although by law this has become the prevalent form of titular inheritance among the Spanish nobility). A title may occasionally be shared and thus multiplied, in the case of a single title, or divided when the family bears multiple titles. In the French nobility, often the children and other male-line descendants of a lawful noble titleholder self-assumed the same or a lower title of nobility; while not legal, such titles were generally tolerated at court during both the ancien regime and 19th century France as titres de courtoisie.

== Examples ==
- Hereditary monarchy – in Bhutan, Brunei, Cambodia, Japan, Thailand, Tonga, Belgium, Denmark, Luxembourg, Liechtenstein, Monaco, the Netherlands, Norway, Spain, Sweden, Jordan, Morocco, Qatar, Saudi Arabia, Kuwait, Oman, Bahrain, Lesotho, Eswatini, and the Commonwealth realms.

Other national constitutions use different modes of succession to their monarchies, e.g. the election of the Pope in the Vatican City, and especially in East Asia often adding an element of selection (e.g. at a family council) among eligible relations of the monarch, such as in Cambodia. Special cases are the two federal monarchies, Malaysia and the United Arab Emirates, where the constituent states of each federation are hereditary monarchies, but those rulers form an electoral college that assigns the federal position of head of state (President of the United Arab Emirates) to one of their number (Ruler of Abu Dhabi) for a term (of five years). A similar system existed in the Holy Roman Empire.

- Titles of nobility in the United Kingdom (Duke, Marquess, Earl, Viscount and Baron) and other countries (see peerage). In the United Kingdom, most titles of nobility (peerages and the lower title of Baronet) pass only to the eldest son (or in the non ducal Peerage of Scotland to the eldest daughter in the absence of male heirs); all other sons and daughters of peers are commoners though they may use one or more not independently inheritable courtesy titles, either Lord, Lady or The Honourable depending on the rank of the peerage held by their father or mother, or another title styled like a peerage, but without a seat in the House of Lords, usually one or two ranks below their father's. In many European countries, titles may be inherited by all the heirs – male and female – of a family, whose members thus all share the same title at the same time (for instance, within the szlachta nobility of Poland or in the nobilities of the successor states of the Holy Roman Empire). Indeed in Poland a coat of arms could eventually be correctly adopted by marriage to a titled szlachta spouse – either male or female. In the Far East, the main (Chinese-induced) tradition was rather for titles to devalue as the generations succeed each other, but not to the same rank.
- Hereditary chieftaincy – manifested in countries in various parts of Africa, Asia, South America, and Oceania. Examples range from the politically powerful (such as the Nigerian chiefs and the king of the Zulu Nation) to the merely titular (such as the rajas, babus and rais of India and the Arab sheikhs).
- Some court titles, e.g. in the United Kingdom, including Earl Marshal and Lord Great Chamberlain. Most of these are sinecures, i.e. purely ceremonial. They pass generally to the eldest son (except for that of Lord Great Chamberlain, which is split between the heads of the Cholmondeley and Willoughby families).
- Many other – especially feudal age – offices became inheritable, often connected to military (e.g. keeper of a castle, such as Castellan; in Japan even shōgun) or domanial functions, which is also why some such functions became noble titles (e.g. Burgrave, Margrave).
- Certain religious positions, such as the Aga Khan and Dā'ī al-Mutlaq.

== Coparcenary ==
Coparcenary is the situation in which two or more people inherit a title equally between them as a result of which none can inherit until all but one have renounced their right to the inheritance. This could arise when a title passes through and vests in female heirs in the absence of a male heir. Before they could inherit, each of the female heirs would be an heir presumptive (or heir portioner presumptive in Scotland). After they inherited, since the title could not be held by two people simultaneously, two daughters (without a brother) who inherited in this way would do so as coparceners. In these circumstances, the title would in fact be held in abeyance until one of them renounced it, for herself and her successors, in favour of the other, or until the entire estate naturally descends to a single coparcener (eg by the subsequent death of one of the two coparceners). In England and Wales, passage of a title in this fashion is effected under the rules laid down in the Law of Property Act 1925.

== See also ==
- Substantive title
- Aristocracy
- False titles of nobility
- Forms of address in the United Kingdom
- Great Officers of State
- Honorifics
- List of last scions
- Royal and noble ranks
- Royal and noble styles
- Birthright
- Jus sanguinis
- Jus soli
