= Manuel III =

Manuel III may refer to:

- Manuel III of Trebizond (1364–1417)
- Manuel III of Kongo (ruled 1911–1914)
- Manuel III, Patriarch of Lisbon (born in 1948)
