= Abolition of monarchy =

A monarchy may be abolished through a legislative or revolutionary movement. The abolition of an absolute monarchy in favour of limited government under a constitutional monarchy is a less radical form of anti-monarchism that has succeeded in some nations that still remain monarchies, such as Sweden, Spain, and Thailand.

Abolition has been carried out in various ways, including via abdication leading to the extinction of the monarchy, legislative reform, revolution, coup d'état, and decolonisation. Abolition became more frequent in the 20th century, with the number of monarchies in Europe falling from 22 to 12 between 1914 and 2015, and the number of republics rising from 4 to 34. Decolonisation and independence have resulted in an abolition of monarchies in a number of former colonies such as those created by the United Kingdom.

Motivations for abolition include egalitarianism and anti-class views, eliminating a rival system potentially opposed to another incoming system (as had occurred in Romania in 1947), opposition to undemocratic and hereditary institutions, perception of monarchy as anachronistic or outdated, and opposition to a particular monarch or dynasty. In many colonies and former colonies, abolishing the influence of the monarchy of a colonising state is considered part of decolonisation. In many Commonwealth realms, the monarchy may be viewed as a foreign institution running counter to the national identity or national sovereignty.

In the 21st century, some countries that are monarchies have significant republican movements, such as Spain and Australia. Since the beginning of the 20th century, restorations of monarchies have been comparatively rare. Examples are the monarchy of Spain, which since 1947 had been nominally a regency with a vacant throne but the Bourbon dynasty was restored in 1975; the reinstatement in 1991 of the Emir of Kuwait following abolition in 1990 and the Gulf War; and a 1993 transition of Cambodia from a Marxist-Leninist republic to an elective monarchy.

== Ancient world ==
=== Classical Athens ===
The city-state of Athens was ruled by monarchs in a period before the establishment of Athenian Democracy. Most of this is either mythical or semi-historical. The Athenian monarchy was abolished and replaced with lifetime archons around 1068 BC, whose power was reduced over many years.

=== Overthrow of the Roman monarchy ===
The Roman Republic was established after the overthrow of the seventh king of Rome, Lucius Tarquinius Superbus, in 509 BC, after his disrespect for Roman customs and the Senate as well as his use of violence to control Rome.

== Civil War and English Republic ==
Under the leadership of Oliver Cromwell, in 1649, King Charles I was tried for high treason, convicted and executed. This marked the conclusion of the English Civil War which resulted in the Parliament of England overthrowing the English monarchy, and initiating a period of an English republic (known as the Wars of the Three Kingdoms). After eleven years, in 1660, a limited monarchy was restored but moderated by an independent Parliament.

In the Kingdom of England, the Glorious Revolution of 1688 furthered the constitutional monarchy, restricted by laws such as the Bill of Rights 1689 and the Act of Settlement 1701. At the same time, in Scotland, the Convention of Estates enacted the Claim of Right Act 1689, which placed similar limits on the Scottish monarchy.

== Atlantic and French Revolutions ==
=== American ===
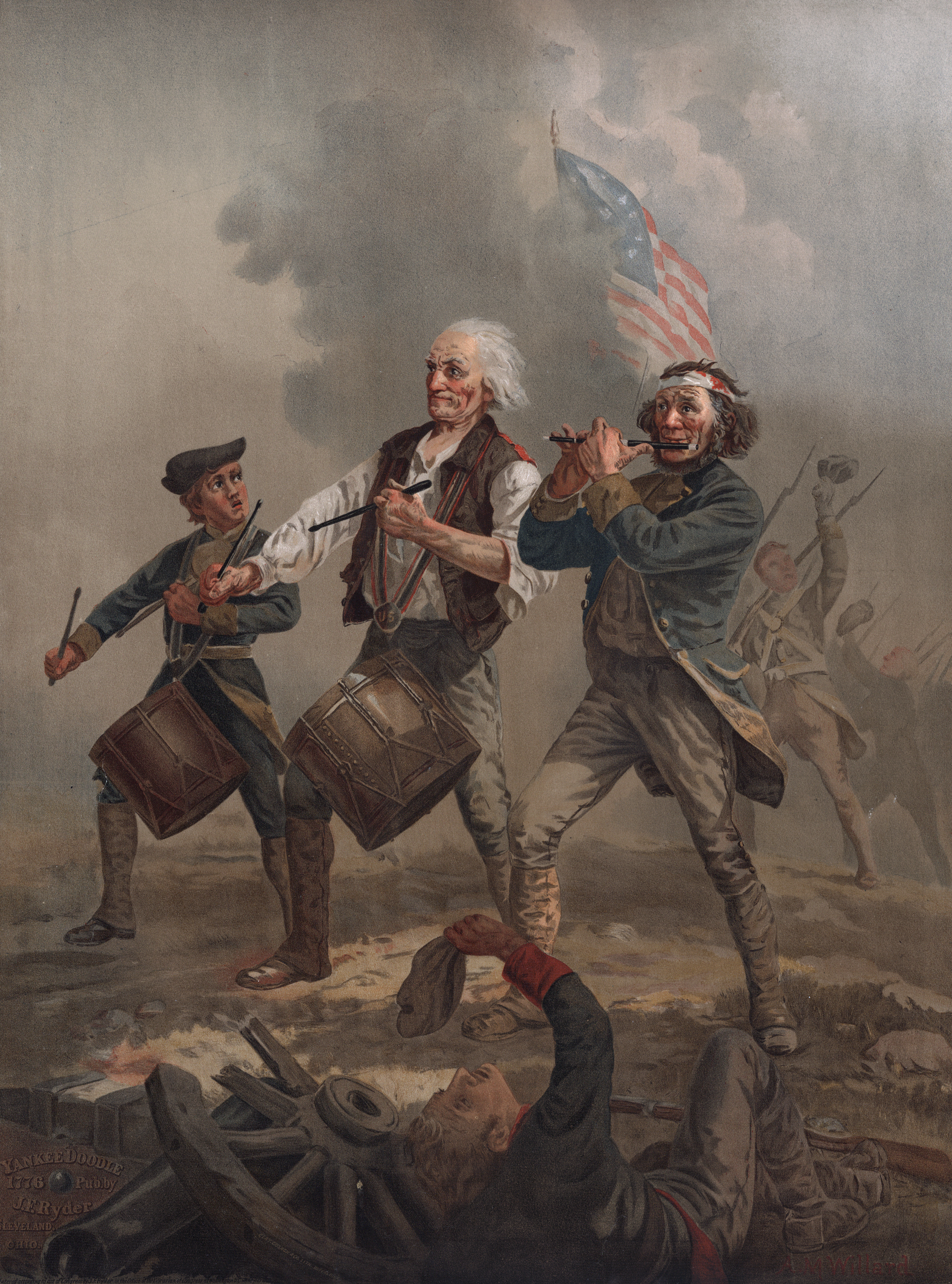
The Spirit of '76, originally titled Yankee Doodle, painted by Archibald Willard in 1875, is an iconic image representing the patriotic sentiment surrounding the American Revolutionary War.

Organized anti-monarchism in what is now the United States developed out of a gradual revolution that began in 1765, as colonists resisted a stamp tax through boycott and condemnation of tax officials. While they were subject to the authority of the Parliament of Great Britain (as the monarchy was a limited monarchy since 1660), the North American citizens increasingly clashed with the Parliament that did not provide seats for parliamentary representatives from North America. With the Declaration of Independence in 1776, anti-monarchical propaganda resulted in violent protests that systematically removed symbols of monarchy. For instance, an equestrian statue of George III in New York City was toppled. Parliamentary loyalists were particularly affected by partisan attacks, with tens of thousands leaving for British Canada. Property that remained was confiscated by each of thirteen newly created States through newly passed laws. Artifacts from the colonial period depicting the British monarchy are seldom found in the United States. However, not all sentiment equated to anti-monarchism. A normality of a monarchy at the head of a polity remained, that some Americans saw a presidency in monarchical terms, a Caesar of the republic, was an early debate in the new republic.

=== French ===
Liberty Leading the People, painted by Eugène Delacroix in 1830, featuring a depiction of the modern French national personification Marianne

One of the most significant abolitions of monarchy in history—along with the Dutch Republic of 1581–1795—involved the Ancien Régime in 1792 during the French Revolution. The French monarchy was later restored several times with differing levels of authority. Napoleon, initially a hero of the Republican revolution, crowned himself emperor in 1804, only to be replaced by the Bourbon Restoration in 1815, which in turn was replaced by the more liberal July Monarchy in 1830.

The 1848 Revolution was a clearer anti-monarchic uprising that replaced the succession of royal leaders with the short-lived Second French Republic. Louis Napoleon Bonaparte established the Second French Empire (1852–1870), retaining republican aspects while placing himself in the center of the state until the losses in the Franco-Prussian War led to his fall, resulting in the French Third Republic and the definitive end of the monarchy in France. Monarchism, which had held a majority in the National Assembly after the 1871 election, slowly fizzled out over the course of the rest of the century.

== 19th century ==
=== Africa ===
==== Madagascar ====
The monarchy of Madagascar, known as the Merina Kingdom, came to an end in 1897 when France made it a colony and overthrew Queen Ranavalona III.

==== Zimbabwe ====
In 1629, the Mwenemutapa attempted to throw out the Portuguese. He failed and in turn he himself was overthrown, leading to the Portuguese installation of Mavura Mhande Felipe on the throne. In 1917, Mambo Chioko, the last king of the dynasty, was killed in battle against the Portuguese.

=== Americas ===
==== Mexico ====
The First Mexican Empire existed from the September 1821 Declaration of Independence until the emperor's abdication in March 1823. The Provisional Government took power and the First Mexican Republic was proclaimed in 1824. Due to French intervention under Napoleon III, the Second Mexican Empire lasted from 1864 to 1867, when it collapsed and its Emperor, Maximilian I of Mexico, was executed.

==== Brazil ====
In Brazil, the monarchy was formally established in 1815 through the United Kingdom of Portugal, Brazil and the Algarves (of which the Kingdom of Brazil was a constituent state), it evolved into the Empire of Brazil in 1822, and was abolished in 1889, when Emperor Pedro II was overthrown by a republican military coup (the status of the republic was confirmed by a plebiscite in 1993 that resulted in 86% of the votes to the republican government).

=== Asia ===
==== Burma ====
The monarchy of Burma was abolished in 1885 when the last king, Thibaw Min, lost his throne and the country was annexed by Britain.

==== South Asia ====
In 1858 the Mughal Empire came to an end after losing a war against Britain, and its Emperor, Bahadur Shah II, lost his throne.

==== Bengal ====
British rule in Bengal began with the fall of Siraj-ud-Daulah at the Battle of Plassey in 1757. And the Bengal Nawabs came to an end.

=== Europe ===
==== Italy ====
Between 1859 and 1861, four monarchies in Southern Europe ceased to exist (Parma, Modena, Tuscany and the Two Sicilies) when they all became part of the new Kingdom of Italy.

==== Spain ====
In Spain monarchy was abolished from 1873 to 1874 by the First Spanish Republic, but then restored until 1931.

=== Pacific ===
==== Hawaii ====
In 1893 foreign business leaders overthrew Queen Liliʻuokalani of the Kingdom of Hawaii. They established a republic, which was annexed by the United States in 1898.

==== Tahiti ====
The monarchy of Tahiti came to an end in 1880 when France made it a colony and overthrew King Pōmare V.

==== Manuʻa ====
After ceding sovereignty of the Manuʻa Islands of modern-day American Samoa to the United States in 1904, the last King of Manu'ʻa, Tui Manuʻa Elisala, died on 2 July 1909. All attempts to revive the position since his death have been met with opposition by the United States government.

== 20th century ==
=== Nationalism ===
==== China ====
The monarchy of China ceased to exist in 1912 when the Xinhai Revolution led by Sun Yat-sen succeeded in overthrowing the young Xuantong Emperor; this marked the end of the Qing dynasty and the start of the Republic of China. In 1915, Yuan Shikai briefly proclaimed the Empire of China with himself as the emperor; the regime failed to gain legitimacy and collapsed three months later. In 1917, the Qing loyalist Zhang Xun sought to revive the Qing dynasty and briefly reinstalled the Xuantong Emperor to the Chinese throne; this attempt is known as the "Manchu Restoration" in historiography. The monarchy in parts of China was restored through the Japanese-sponsored client state known as Manchukuo with the former Qing emperor as its leader until the final abolition in 1945.

The area of Tibet was ruled by the Ganden Phodrang government which continued through the annexation of Tibet by the People's Republic of China until the Tibetan rebellion in 1959 where the monarchy in Tibet was dissolved although it continued in exile as the Central Tibetan Administration in India.

During the Xinhai Revolution, Outer Mongolia declared independence from the Qing dynasty of China in the Mongolian Revolution of 1911. The Bogd Khanate of Mongolia was subsequently proclaimed, although the Republic of China laid claims to Outer Mongolia and was widely recognized by the international community as having sovereignty over it. In 1924, the Mongolian People's Republic was established, bringing an end to the monarchy in Mongolia.

=== World War I and aftermath ===
==== Russia ====
The conditions inside the Russian Empire and the poor performance in the war gave rise to a revolution in 1917, which toppled the monarchy. This was followed by a second revolution in October of the same year, which led to the execution of the last monarch, Nicholas II, and the creation of a Marxist-Leninist government. The Russian Civil War saw various monarchist, republican, anarchist, nationalist and socialist factions fight each other, with the Baltic states, Poland, and Finland becoming independent, and the Bolsheviks restored control elsewhere.

==== Germany, Austria-Hungary, Ottoman Empire, Montenegro ====
The defeated German, Austro-Hungarian and Ottoman empires saw the abolition of their monarchies in the close aftermath of the war, ending the reigns of Wilhelm II, Charles I and Mehmed VI respectively. The monarchs of the constituent states within the German Empire, most importantly Ludwig III of Bavaria, Frederick Augustus III of Saxony and Wilhelm II of Württemberg, soon abdicated. During the war, monarchies were planned for Poland (Kingdom of Poland), the Grand Duchy of Finland (to have a Finnish King), and Lithuania (Mindaugas II of Lithuania), with a protectorate-like suzerainty exercised by the German Empire. Both intended kings renounced their thrones after Germany's defeat in November 1918. King Nicholas I of Montenegro lost his throne when the country became a part of Yugoslavia in 1918.

=== World War II and aftermath ===
==== Italy, Albania, Bulgaria, Hungary, Romania, Yugoslavia, Croatia ====
In 1922, Benito Mussolini's March on Rome led to King Victor Emmanuel III appointing Mussolini Prime Minister. In 1939 Italy invaded Albania and removed the reigning self-proclaimed King Zog and instated their own King Victor Emmanuel III as its new monarch. Italy, along with the eastern European monarchies of Bulgaria, Hungary and Romania were forced to join with Germany by their dictators in World War II against the Kingdom of Yugoslavia, the Western allies and the Soviet Union. When Yugoslavia fell in 1941 the Independent State of Croatia was established under a nominal monarchy, but it was in fact a one party state under Ante Pavelić and a puppet state of Nazi Germany. With the fall of Mussolini in July 1943, the monarchy in Croatia was abolished. As the Axis powers were defeated in the war, communist partisans in occupied Yugoslavia and occupied Albania seized power and ended the monarchies. Communists in Bulgaria, Hungary, and Romania removed their monarchies with strong backing by the Soviet Union, which had many troops and supporters placed there during the course of the war. Through this, Peter II of Yugoslavia, Simeon II of Bulgaria and Michael I of Romania all lost their thrones. King Victor Emmanuel III of Italy had remained King after the Fall of the Fascist regime in Italy but transferred most of his powers to his son after the Armistice of Cassibile. After Victor Emmanuel abdicated to save the monarchy, a narrow referendum in 1946 ended the short reign of his son King Umberto II and the Italian monarchy ceased to exist.

=== Republicanism ===
==== Australia (monarchy kept after referendum) ====
In a 1999 referendum, the voters of Australia rejected a proposal to replace the constitutional monarchy with a republic with a president appointed by Parliament. The proposal was rejected in all states, with only the Australian Capital Territory voting in favour. Though polling consistently showed a majority in favour of a republic, the result of the referendum was attributed to a split among republicans between those who supported the presented model and those who supported a directly elected president.

==== Greece ====
In the modern history of Greece, the monarchy was toppled in 1924, as a result of the National Schism and the Asia Minor Disaster. The resulting Second Hellenic Republic led a troubled existence, until a coup restored the monarchy in 1935. The subsequent dictatorial 4th of August Regime was established with the support of King George II of Greece, further delegitimizing the monarchy.

During the Axis occupation of Greece, George II nominally led the Greek government in exile, but the post-war fate of the monarchy was a major dividing issue for Greeks, especially with the rise of the pro-communist National Liberation Front (EAM) as the country's largest resistance movement. As a compromise, the issue was to be determined by a referendum after the war. In the end, the threat of a post-war communist takeover led the Venizelist republicans to ally with the monarchists; with the defeat of EAM in the Dekemvriana, the subsequent White Terror, and the outbreak of the Greek Civil War in 1946 resulted in a monarchist victory in the 1946 referendum and the return of George II to the country.

The last king, Constantine II, interfered in politics during the Iouliana of 1965. The resulting political crisis led to a military coup in April 1967. Constantine II reluctantly accepted the fait accompli and lent it legitimacy, but when he tried to stage a counter-coup later that year, he was defeated and forced into exile. Greece formally remained a monarchy until it was abolished by the military junta in June 1973, followed by a July referendum confirming that decision. The restoration of the monarchy was overwhelmingly defeated, after constitutional legality was restored, by a free referendum in 1974.

==== Spain ====
In Spain, the monarchy was again abolished in 1931 by the Second Spanish Republic (1931–1939). In 1947, Francisco Franco declared Spain a monarchy but kept himself as regent for life with the constitutional setup essentially unchanged. Per the right the 1947 law granted him to decide who would be the future Spanish monarch, he appointed Juan Carlos of Bourbon his successor in 1969. The "Prince of Spain" became king at Franco's death in 1975, and during the Spanish transition to democracy, the Spanish constitution of 1978 put the monarchy on a new constitutional basis. The existence of monarchy in Spain is an entrenched clause with much stricter rules for constitutional amendment than other constitutional provisions.

==== Portugal ====
The monarchy of Portugal was also overthrown in 1910, two years after the assassination of King Carlos I, ending the reign of Manuel II, who died in exile in England in 1932 without issue.

=== Communism, socialism, and Islamism ===
==== Afghanistan ====
In 1973, the monarchy of King Mohammed Zahir Shah of Afghanistan was abolished after a socialist-supported coup d'état led by Mohammad Daoud Khan, from the same Musahiban royal family, who declared himself the first President of Afghanistan.

==== Ethiopia ====
Emperor Haile Selassie I was overthrown in 1974 as a result of the Ethiopian Revolution, ending almost three millennia of monarchical rule in Ethiopia.

==== Indochina ====
In 1945, during the August Revolution, Bảo Đại abdicated under the pressure of the Việt Minh led by Ho Chi Minh. This marked the end of the Nguyễn dynasty and the Vietnamese monarchy. From 1949 to 1955, Bảo Đại served as the Quốc Trưởng (lit. 'Chief of State') of the State of Vietnam (as a French Union's associated state) and did not receive the title of Hoàng Đế (lit. 'Emperor').

Political upheaval and Communist insurrection put an end to the monarchies of Indochina after World War II: a short-lived attempt to leave a monarchical form of government in post-colonial, South Vietnam came to naught in a fraudulent 1955 referendum, a military coup overthrew the kingless monarchy in Cambodia in 1970 and a Communist takeover ended the monarchy in Laos in 1975. Cambodia's monarchy later saw an unexpected rebirth under an internationally mediated peace settlement with former king Norodom Sihanouk being restored as a figurehead in 1993.

==== Iran ====
The Pahlavi dynasty's rule in Iran ended following the Iranian Revolution of 1979 overthrowing Shah Mohammad Reza Pahlavi and leading to the establishment of an Islamic republic.

==== Arab countries ====
The monarchy of Egypt was abolished in 1953, a year after the military overthrow of King Farouk, which caused him to abdicate in favour of his infant son Fuad II. The monarchy of Iraq ended in 1958 when King Faisal II was killed and a republic proclaimed. The monarchy of Yemen was abolished in 1962 when King Muhammad al-Badr was overthrown in a coup, although he continued to resist his opponents until 1970. King Idris of Libya was overthrown by a military coup led by Muammar Gaddafi in 1969.

=== Imperialism expansion and decolonisation ===
==== Commonwealth of Nations ====
Many monarchies were abolished in the middle of the 20th century or later as part of the process of decolonization. This included several Commonwealth realms, which were sovereign states in personal union with the monarchy of the United Kingdom.

The monarchy of Ireland was not abolished following the Irish war of independence in the 1920s. The Irish Free State was created as a separate state from the United Kingdom; it was nominally a monarchy but transitioned towards a more republican form of government throughout its existence. The Irish Constitution that came into force in 1937 left the question of Republic or monarchy vague, but established a President of Ireland, an office usually absent in monarchies. The monarchy was officially abolished by the Republic of Ireland Act of 1948, which came into force in 1949.

The monarchies of India, Ghana, Nigeria, Kenya, Tanganyika, Uganda, Guyana, and Malawi were abolished shortly after they became independent of the United Kingdom, whilst remaining within the Commonwealth. Others waited longer before abolishing their monarchies, such as Pakistan, South Africa, The Gambia, Sierra Leone, Malta, Trinidad and Tobago, and Mauritius. The latest country to become a republic within the Commonwealth was Barbados in 2021.

With the exceptions of Ireland and India, in each case the deposed monarch was Elizabeth II. Most realms which abolished their monarchy did so by declaring a new constitution or amending it to remove references to the Crown, with the exception of Fiji, whose monarchy was abolished in 1987 following a series of coups d'état.

==== Korea ====
In 1910 the last emperor of Korea, Sunjong, lost his throne when the country was annexed by Japan. However, the Korean royal family was mediatized as a puppet family within the Japanese imperial family. Many of the Korean royals were forcibly re-educated in Japan and forced to marry Japanese royalty and aristocrats to meld the ruling families of the two empires. With the abolition of the Japanese aristocracy and cadet branches of the imperial family, the Korean royals officially lost their remaining status.

==== South Asia ====
The independence of India from the United Kingdom in 1947 posed a unique problem. From 1858, when the British government replaced Company rule with direct Crown rule, it had been governed as a quasi-federation, with much of the country under the direct rule of the British monarch, who was styled as the Emperor of India. The remainder of the country, however, was under a form of indirect rule under him through its division into over 500 subnational monarchies, known as princely states; each was ruled by a prince who acknowledged the suzerainty of the Indian Emperor. The princely states ranged from powerful and largely independent principalities such as Hyderabad or Mysore, with a high level of autonomy, to tiny fiefdoms a few dozen acres (in the low tens of hectares) in size.

In 1947, it was agreed that India would be partitioned into the independent British dominions of India and Pakistan, with the princely states acceding to one nation or the other. The accession process proceeded smoothly, with the notable exception of four of the most influential principalities. The Muslim ruler of the Hindu-majority state of Junagadh acceded to Pakistan, but his decision was overruled by the Indian government, while Hyderabad chose to be independent, but was forcibly annexed to India in 1948. The Hindu ruler of Jammu and Kashmir, among the largest and most powerful of the principalities, but with a Muslim-majority population, initially held off on a decision. In the autumn of 1947, an invading force from Pakistan frightened the ruler into acceding to India. The ruler of Kalat, in Baluchistan, declared his independence in 1947, after which the state was forcibly merged with Pakistan, resulting in an insurgency persisting to this day. With the promulgation of the Indian constitution in 1950, India abolished its monarchy under the British crown and became a Republic within the Commonwealth of Nations, followed by Pakistan in 1956; as a result of both developments, the majority of the princes formally lost their sovereign rights. A few remaining principalities in Pakistan retained their autonomy until 1969 when they finally acceded to Pakistan. The Indian government formally derecognized its princely families in 1971, followed by Pakistan in 1972.

Finally, in 1975, King Palden Thondup Namgyal of Sikkim lost his throne when the country became a state of India following a referendum.

=== New monarchies ===
The 20th century also saw the formation of a number of new monarchies that still exist to this day such as Bhutan (1907), Jordan (1921), Saudi Arabia (1932), and Malaysia (1957).

== 21st century ==
The Kingdom of Nepal was transformed into a republic by the 1st Nepalese Constituent Assembly in 2008. Barbados abolished its monarchy and became a republic on 30 November 2021 following a constitutional amendment by the Parliament.

In addition, there were protests in favour of republicanism in Cambodia in 2013. In 2013, an alleged coup plot by Al Islah to overthrow the monarchy of the United Arab Emirates and establish an Islamic republic failed. Following the accession of Charles III in 2022, anti-monarchy protests also occurred in the United Kingdom; some protesters were arrested, but were later released without further action being taken.

== Monarchism in former monarchies ==
In a referendum in Brazil in 1993, voters rejected an attempt to restore the country's monarchy. Unsuccessful efforts to restore the monarchies of some of the Balkan states in the former Eastern Bloc continue. Former King Michael of Romania and Prince Alexander of Serbia had been allowed to return, gained some popularity, and played largely apolitical public roles, but never came close to being restored to their ancestral thrones. However, in Bulgaria, Simeon Saxe-Coburg-Gotha, who was deposed from the Bulgarian throne in 1946, was elected and served as the Prime Minister of his country from 2001 to 2005. The only formerly communist country to have held a referendum on the monarchy was Albania, where the claimant to his father's throne, the self-styled Leka I, lost by a two-thirds majority.

== Summary table since the 20th century ==
Country		Last monarch	Year	Notes
1900s
	Songhai	Askia Malla	1901	Abolished by the French and incorporated into French West Africa.
Kingdom of Rimatara 1856-1891	Rimatara	Tamaeva V	1901	Abolished by the French and incorporated into the Establishments in Oceania.
	Nuku Hiva	Laurent Piukeke Taupotini	1901	Abolished by the French and incorporated into the Establishments in Oceania.
	Gumma	Firisa	1902	Annexed by the Ethiopian Empire.
Aceh Sultanate	Aceh	Alauddin Muhammad Da'ud Syah II	1903	Aceh War
Ghezo of Dahomey	Dahomey	Agoli-agbo	1904	Incorporation into French Dahomey.
	Oyo	Adeyemi I Alowolodu	1905	Last monarch died; the realm was incorporated into the British Southern Nigeria Protectorate.
	Habr Yunis	Nur Ahmed Aman	1907	Incorporation into British Somaliland.
	Bali	Dewa Agung Jambe II	1908	Incorporation into Dutch East Indies.
Mwali Sultanate	Mwali	Salima Machamba	1909	Incorporation into the French Comoros.
1910s
	Portugal	Manuel II	1910	Coup d'état
Korea 1882	Korea	Sunjong	1910	Native monarchy abolished; replaced by Japanese rule through 1945.
	Angoche	Umar Farelay	1910	Incorporation into Portugal.
	Nri	Eze Nri Òbalíke	1911	Abolished by the British and incorporated into Southern Nigeria Protectorate.
	Kasanje	Ngwangwa	1911	Incorporation into Portuguese West Africa.
	Riau-Lingga	Abdul Rahman II	1911	Abolished by the Dutch.
Qing Dynasty	China	Puyi	1912	Xinhai Revolution – Emperor ousted by warlords and republicans. (Briefly restored in 1917)
	Wadai	Dud Murra of Wadai	1912	French annexation of Wadai Empire.
	Ndzuwani	Saidi Mohamed bin Saidi Omar	1912	Incorporation into the French Comoros.
Principality of Samos	Samos	Grigorios Vegleris	1912	Incorporation into Greece.
Kingdom of Kongo according to Giovanni Cavazzi da Montecuccolo	Kongo	Manuel III of Kongo	1914	Position abolished by the Portuguese after an unsuccessful revolt.
	Mbunda	Mwene Mbandu Kapova I of Mbunda	1914	Position abolished by the Portuguese after an unsuccessful revolt.
	Sulu	Sultan Jamalul-Kiram II	1915	Split into American Insular Government over the Philippine islands, British North Borneo and the Dutch East Indies.
	Darfur	Ali Dinar	1916	Re-incorporation into Anglo-Egyptian Sudan.
	China	Yuan Shikai	1916	Monarchy dropped, shortly after the outbreak of the National Protection War.
	Russia	Nicholas II	1917	Russian Revolution
Russia	Finland	Nicholas II	1917	Finnish Declaration of Independence
Kingdom of Montenegro	Montenegro	Nicholas I	1918	Referendum uniting Montenegro with Serbia.
German Empire	Germany	Wilhelm II	1918	All on account of German defeat in World War I and the subsequent German Revolution.
Prussia 1892-1918	Prussia	Wilhelm II	1918	All on account of German defeat in World War I and the subsequent German Revolution.
	Bavaria	Ludwig III	1918	All on account of German defeat in World War I and the subsequent German Revolution.
	Württemberg	William II	1918	All on account of German defeat in World War I and the subsequent German Revolution.
	Saxony	Frederick Augustus III	1918	All on account of German defeat in World War I and the subsequent German Revolution.
	Hesse	Ernest Louis	1918	All on account of German defeat in World War I and the subsequent German Revolution.
	Baden	Frederick II	1918	All on account of German defeat in World War I and the subsequent German Revolution.
	Saxe-Weimar-Eisenach	William Ernest	1918	All on account of German defeat in World War I and the subsequent German Revolution.
	Mecklenburg-Schwerin	Frederick Francis IV	1918	All on account of German defeat in World War I and the subsequent German Revolution.
	Mecklenburg-Strelitz	Adolphus Frederick VI	1918	All on account of German defeat in World War I and the subsequent German Revolution.
	Oldenburg	Frederick Augustus II	1918	All on account of German defeat in World War I and the subsequent German Revolution.
	Brunswick	Ernst Augustus	1918	All on account of German defeat in World War I and the subsequent German Revolution.
	Anhalt	Joachim Ernst	1918	All on account of German defeat in World War I and the subsequent German Revolution.
	Saxe-Coburg and Gotha	Charles Edward	1918	All on account of German defeat in World War I and the subsequent German Revolution.
	Saxe-Meiningen	Bernhard III	1918	All on account of German defeat in World War I and the subsequent German Revolution.
	Saxe-Altenburg	Ernst II	1918	All on account of German defeat in World War I and the subsequent German Revolution.
Germany	Waldeck-Pyrmont	Friedrich	1918	All on account of German defeat in World War I and the subsequent German Revolution.
	Lippe	Leopold IV	1918	All on account of German defeat in World War I and the subsequent German Revolution.
	Schaumburg-Lippe	Adolf II	1918	All on account of German defeat in World War I and the subsequent German Revolution.
	Schwarzburg-Rudolstadt	Günther Victor	1918	All on account of German defeat in World War I and the subsequent German Revolution.
	Schwarzburg-Sondershausen	Günther Victor	1918	All on account of German defeat in World War I and the subsequent German Revolution.
	Reuss Elder Line	Heinrich XXIV	1918	All on account of German defeat in World War I and the subsequent German Revolution.
	Reuss Younger Line	Heinrich XXVII	1918	All on account of German defeat in World War I and the subsequent German Revolution.
Habsburg Monarchy	Austria	Charles I & IV	1918	Charles I "renounced participation" in state affairs, but did not abdicate. Monarchy officially abolished by the Treaty of Saint-Germain-en-Laye, on 10 September 1919.
	Hungary	Charles I & IV	1918	Monarchy restored in 1920, although the throne remained vacant with a regent.
Finland 1918	Finland	Frederick Charles I	1918	Monarchy never in effect.
Lithuania 1918-1940	Lithuania	Mindaugas II	1918	Monarchy never in effect.
	Poland	Vacant (ruled by Regency Council)	1918	Monarchy never in effect.
	United Baltic Duchy	Duke Adolf Friedrich of Mecklenburg	1918	Monarchy never in effect.
	Courland and Semigallia	Vacant	1918	Monarchy never in effect.
	Serbia	Peter I	1918	Throne transferred to the newly created Kingdom of Serbs, Croats and Slovenes, then Kingdom of Yugoslavia.
	Ukraine	Pavlo Skoropadskyi	1918	Removed from power, following an uprising led by Symon Petliura and the withdrawal of German forces from Kyiv.
1920s
Emirate of Bukhara	Bukhara (Uzbekistan)	Mohammed Alim Khan	1920	Monarchy deposed by an invasion by the Red Army (Bukhara operation).
Khanate of Khiva	Khiva (Uzbekistan)	Abdallah Khan of Khiva	1920	Monarchy deposed by a communist uprising aided by the Red Army (Khivan Revolution).
	North Caucasian Emirate	Uzun Hajji Saltinsky	1920	Abolished by the Bolsheviks.
Kingdom of Syria	Syria	Faisal I	1920	Monarchy deposed following the Siege of Damascus.
	Upper Asir	Al-Hasan Bin Ayad	1920	Incorporation into Nejd.
Emirate of Ha'il	Jabal Shammar	Muhammad bin Talal Al Rashid	1921	Incorporation into Nejd.
	Ottoman Empire	Mehmed VI	1922	Sultanate abolished in 1922.
Witu Protectorate	Wituland	Fumo 'Umar ibn Ahmad	1923	Sultanate abolished by the British and incorporated into the Kenya Colony.
	Greece	George II	1924	Restored in 1935 and abolished again in 1973 (see below).
Bogd Khaanate Mongolia	Mongolia	Bogd Khan	1924	Communist People's Republic proclaimed after the Bogd Khan's death.
	Albania	William I	1925	Monarchy restored in 1928 (Albanian Kingdom).
	Mohammerah	Khaz'al al-Ka'bi	1925	Sheikhdom abolished by Persia.
Hejaz 1920	Hejaz	Ali bin Hussein, King of Hejaz	1925	Conquered by the Nejd.
Kingdom of Kurdistan	Kurdistan	Mahmud Barzanji	1925	Kingdom of Kurdistan reconquered by the British.
	Orungu	Rogombé-Nwèntchandi	1927	Abolished by the French and incorporated into French Equatorial Africa.
	Hobyo	Ali Yusuf Kenadid	1927	Incorporation into Italian Somaliland.
	Afghanistan	Habibullāh Kalakāni	1929	After the fall of Kalakani on 13 October 1929, the Emirate ended, and was replaced by the revived Kingdom of Afghanistan.
1930s
	Baidah		1930	Incorporation into the Mutawakkilite Kingdom of Yemen.
Idrisid Emirate of Asir	Asir	Sayyid al-Hasan ibn Ali al-Idrisi al-Hasani	1930	Incorporation into Saudi Arabia.
	Kumul	Maqsud Shah	1930	Upon Maqsud Shah's death in March 1930 Jin Shuren replaced the Khanate with three normal provincial administrative districts Hami, Yihe, and Yiwu. This set off the Kumul Rebellion, in which Yulbars Khan attempted to restore the heir Nasir to the throne.
	Spain	Alfonso XIII	1931	Later restored (see below).
	Jimma	Abba Jofir	1932	Deposed and incorporated into the Ethiopian Empire.
Principality of Najran	Najran	Ali II ibn Muhsin ibn Husayn	1934	Incorporation into Saudi Arabia.
	Albania	Zog I	1939	Throne usurped by Victor Emmanuel III, after Italian invasion.
1940s
	Greece	George II	1941	The end of the monarchy was announced by Georgios Tsolakoglou after taking over as prime minister of the Hellenic State, which was collaborating with the Third Reich and not recognized by the Allies.
	Albania	Victor Emmanuel III	1943	Relinquished throne after Italian armistice in 1943.
Croatia Ustasa	Croatia	Tomislav II	1943	Abdicated after withdrawal of Italian support in 1943.
	Italy	Victor Emmanuel III	1943	Monarchy abolished by the Italian Social Republic, which was collaborating with the Third Reich and not recognized by the Allies.
	Iceland	Christian X	1944	Referendum; official result: 99.5% in favour of termination of personal union with Denmark, 98.5% in favour of new republican constitution.
	Montenegro	Vacant (ruled by a governor)	1944	Monarchy abolished after takeover by Yugoslav Partisans
Kingdom of Yugoslavia	Yugoslavia	Peter II	1945	Monarchy abolished by the Communist regime of Josip Broz Tito
	Manchukuo	Puyi	1945	Monarchy abolished after the surrender of Japan. Territories returned to the Republic of China.
Sultanate of Gowa	Gowa	Muhammad Tahur Muhibuddin	1945	Sultanate abolished.
	Vietnam	Bảo Đại	1945	Monarchy abolished after the surrender of Japan.
	Gypsy	Janos I	1945	The king abdicated and no successor was elected.
	Hungary	Miklós Horthy (as regent)	1946	Decision of the parliament without a referendum.
	Italy	Umberto II	1946	Referendum; official result: 54.3% in favour of republic.
	Bulgaria	Simeon II	1946	Referendum; official result: 95% in favour of republic. Tsar Simeon II was exiled by the Communist Fatherland Front regime. Simeon later served as Prime Minister of Bulgaria from 2001 to 2005.
Kingdom of Sarawak	Sarawak	Charles Vyner Brooke	1946	White Rajahs ceded Sarawak to the British Crown, which created the Colony of Sarawak
Sultanate of Deli	Deli	Amaluddin Al Sani Perkasa Alamsyah	1946	Acts of violence against the nobility reached their peak during the bloody incident known as the Social Revolution in 1946. Many kings and members of royal families in North Sumatra were murdered and robbed of property and belongings, including Tengku Amir Hamzah, the Indonesian poet who was beheaded in Kuala Begumit. The family of the Sultanate of Deli and Serdang survived thanks to the protection of the Allied soldiers who were there to accept the surrender of the Japanese.
	Asahan	Shaibun Abdul Jalil Rahmad Shah	1946	Acts of violence against the nobility reached their peak during the bloody incident known as the Social Revolution in 1946. Many kings and members of royal families in North Sumatra were murdered and robbed of property and belongings, including Tengku Amir Hamzah, the Indonesian poet who was beheaded in Kuala Begumit. The family of the Sultanate of Deli and Serdang survived thanks to the protection of the Allied soldiers who were there to accept the surrender of the Japanese.
Sultanate of Langkat	Langkat	Mahmud Abdul Jalil Rahmad Shah	1946	Acts of violence against the nobility reached their peak during the bloody incident known as the Social Revolution in 1946. Many kings and members of royal families in North Sumatra were murdered and robbed of property and belongings, including Tengku Amir Hamzah, the Indonesian poet who was beheaded in Kuala Begumit. The family of the Sultanate of Deli and Serdang survived thanks to the protection of the Allied soldiers who were there to accept the surrender of the Japanese.
	Serdang	Sulaiman Syariful Alam Shah	1946	Acts of violence against the nobility reached their peak during the bloody incident known as the Social Revolution in 1946. Many kings and members of royal families in North Sumatra were murdered and robbed of property and belongings, including Tengku Amir Hamzah, the Indonesian poet who was beheaded in Kuala Begumit. The family of the Sultanate of Deli and Serdang survived thanks to the protection of the Allied soldiers who were there to accept the surrender of the Japanese.
	Princely States		1947–1974	Political integration of India
	Romania	Michael I	1947	Forced to abdicate and exiled by the Communists.
	Ireland	George VI	1949	Abolished the last "monarchy of Ireland" under the terms of the Republic of Ireland Act 1948 as from 18 April 1949, which also saw Ireland become a republic outside the British Commonwealth. Ten days later, the London Declaration was enacted to allow republics and native monarchies to become members of the newly renamed Commonwealth of Nations.
	Mangkunegaran	Mangkunegara VII	1949	Integration with Indonesia.
Sultanate of Siak Sri Indrapura	Siak	Kasim Abdul Jalil Syaifudin I	1949	The Sultan also handed over his property for the struggle of independence of the Republic of Indonesia.
Sunanate of Surakarta	Surakarta Sunanate	Pakubuwono XII	1949	During the Indonesian National Revolution, the Surakarta Sunanate and Mangkunegaran Princedom sent a letter of confidence to Sukarno to demonstrate their support for the newly declared Republic of Indonesia. They were subsequently awarded the status of Daerah Istimewa (Special Region, similar to today's Yogyakarta Sultanate) within the Indonesian state. However, because of political agitation and opposition from Indonesian communists that led to an anti-monarchy movement and rebellion in early 1946, both monarchies had their Special Region status revoked and were then merged into the province of Central Java.
1950s
Pontianak Sultanate	Pontianak	Syarif Hamid II of Pontianak	1950	Integration with Indonesia.
Kingdom of Kotawaringin	Kotawaringin		1950	Integration with Indonesia.
	India	George VI	1950	Abolished its monarchy after adopting a new republican constitution. India became the first republic in the Commonwealth of Nations.
	Jaisalmer	Giridhar Singh Bhati	1950	Merged with the Republic of India.
	Mysore	Jayachamaraja Wodeyar	1950	Merged with the Republic of India.
	Tibet	Tenzin Gyatso	1951	Annexed by the People's Republic of China.
Egypt 1922	Egypt	Fuad II	1953	Republic proclaimed the year after the 1952 Egyptian revolution.
	Pakistan	Elizabeth II	1956	Abolished its monarchy after adopting a new republican constitution.
	Tunisia	Muhammad VIII	1957	Ordered by parliament.
	Ashanti	Prempeh II	1957	Entered into state union with Ghana after independence from the United Kingdom.
	Iraq	Faisal II	1958	Coup d'état
	Bima	Muhammad Salahuddin	1958	In 1958, the Sumbawan principalities were abolished by the Indonesian republic and replaced by a modern bureaucratic structure
1960s
Lordship of Butung	Buton	Falihi of Buton	1960	Integration with Indonesia.
	Ghana	Elizabeth II	1960	Abolished its monarchy pursuant to a referendum; official result: 88% in favour of republic.
South Africa 1928-1994	South Africa	Elizabeth II	1961	Abolished its monarchy pursuant to a referendum; official result: 53% in favour of republic. South Africa also withdrew from the Commonwealth, but was readmitted on 1 June 1994.
	Rwanda	Kigeli V	1961	coup d'état, followed by referendum; official result: 80% in favour of abolishing monarchy.
	Tanganyika	Elizabeth II	1962	Abolished its monarchy after adopting a new republican constitution.
Mutawakkilite Kingdom of Yemen	Yemen	Muhammad al-Badr	1962	coup d'état
	South Kasai	Albert Kalonji	1962	Status of the head of state was complicated, Albert Kalonji used the title of Mulopwe (God-king/Emperor).
	Nigeria	Elizabeth II	1963	Abolished its monarchy after amending its constitution.
	Uganda	Elizabeth II	1963	Abolished its monarchy after amending its constitution.
	Kenya	Elizabeth II	1964	Abolished its monarchy after amending its constitution.
Sultanate of Zanzibar	Zanzibar	Jamshid bin Abdullah	1964	Zanzibar Revolution
	Burundi	Ntare V	1966	Coup d'état
Malawi 1964-2010	Malawi	Elizabeth II	1966	Abolished its monarchy after adopting a new republican constitution.
Sultanate of Fadhli	Fadhli	Nasser bin Abdullah bin Hussein bin Ahmed Alfadhli	1967	Incorporation into the newly created People's Republic of South Yemen.
Qu'aiti Sultanate	Qu'aiti	Ghalib II al-Qu'aiti	1967	Incorporation into the newly created People's Republic of South Yemen.
State of Upper Yafa	Upper Yafa	Muhammad ibn Salih Harharah	1967	Incorporation into the newly created People's Republic of South Yemen.
	Lower Yafa	Mahmud ibn Aidrus Al Afifi	1967	Incorporation into the newly created People's Republic of South Yemen.
	Muflahi	al Qasim ibn Abd ar Rahman	1967	Incorporation into the newly created People's Republic of South Yemen.
	Audhali	Salih ibn al Husayn ibn Jabil Al Audhali	1967	Incorporation into the newly created People's Republic of South Yemen.
	Beihan	Saleh al Hussein Al Habieli	1967	Incorporation into the newly created People's Republic of South Yemen.
	Dathina	Abd al-Qadir ibn Shaya	1967	Incorporation into the newly created People's Republic of South Yemen.
	Dhala	Shafaul ibn Ali Shaif Al Amiri	1967	Incorporation into the newly created People's Republic of South Yemen.
	Wahidi Balhaf	Nasir ibn Abd Allah al-Wahidi	1967	Incorporation into the newly created People's Republic of South Yemen.
	Shaib	Yahya ibn Mutahhar al-Saqladi	1967	Incorporation into the newly created People's Republic of South Yemen.
	Alawi	Salih ibn Sayil Al Alawi	1967	Incorporation into the newly created People's Republic of South Yemen.
	Aqrabi	Mahmud ibn Muhammad Al Aqrabi	1967	Incorporation into the newly created People's Republic of South Yemen.
	Wahidi Haban	Husayn ibn Abd Allah Al Wahidi	1967	Incorporation into the newly created People's Republic of South Yemen.
	Qutaibi		1967	Incorporation into the newly created People's Republic of South Yemen.
	Hadrami	Abd al-Qawi ibn Muhammad al-Hadrami	1967	Incorporation into the newly created People's Republic of South Yemen.
	Mausatta		1967	Incorporation into the newly created People's Republic of South Yemen.
	Busi		1967	Incorporation into the newly created People's Republic of South Yemen.
	Dhabi	Abd al-Rahman ibn Salih	1967	Incorporation into the newly created People's Republic of South Yemen.
	Haushabi	Faisal bin Surur Al Haushabi	1967	Incorporation into the newly created People's Republic of South Yemen.
	Kathiri	Al Husayn ibn Ali	1967	Incorporation into the newly created People's Republic of South Yemen.
Mahra Sultanate	Mahra	Isa ibn Ali ibn Salim Afrar al-Mahri	1967	Incorporation into the newly created People's Republic of South Yemen.
Sultanate of Lahej	Lahej	Ali bin Abd al Karim al Abdali	1967	Incorporation into the newly created People's Republic of South Yemen.
	Al-Hawra	Awad ibn Salih Ba Shahid	1967	Incorporation into the newly created People's Republic of South Yemen.
	Al-`Irqa	Ahmad ibn Abd Allah ibn Abd Allah ibn Awad Ba Das	1967	Incorporation into the newly created People's Republic of South Yemen.
	Lower Aulaqi	Nasir ibn Aidrus Al Awlaqi	1967	Incorporation into the newly created People's Republic of South Yemen.
	Upper Aulaqi	Awad ibn Salih Al Awlaqi	1967	Incorporation into the newly created People's Republic of South Yemen.
	Upper Aulaqi	Amir Abd Allah ibn Muhsin al Yaslami Al Aulaqi	1967	Incorporation into the newly created People's Republic of South Yemen.
	Ankole	Gasiyonga II	1967	Abolished by the government of President Milton Obote. It remains officially inexistant, as President Yoweri Museveni has opposed the kingdom's restoration.
	Tidore	Zainal Abidin Syah	1967	Sultanate abolished.
	Maldives	Muhammad Fareed Didi	1968	Referendum; official result: 81.23% in favour of republic.
	Libya	Idris I	1969	Deposed in a coup d'état led by Colonel Muammar Gaddafi.
	Saloum	Maad Saloum Fode N'Gouye Joof	1969	Last monarchs died; the realms were incorporated into the newly independent Republic of Senegal.
	Sine	Maad a Sinig Mahecor Joof	1969	Last monarchs died; the realms were incorporated into the newly independent Republic of Senegal.
1970s
	Guyana	Elizabeth II	1970	Abolished its monarchy after adopting a resolution establishing a republic.
	Cambodia	Norodom Sihanouk	1970	Coup d'état; later restored (see below).
	Rhodesia	Elizabeth II	1970	Abolished its unrecognised monarchy. An unrecognised government of the British colony of Southern Rhodesia had unilaterally declared independence as Rhodesia in 1965, proclaiming Elizabeth II as Queen, but she did not accept the title, nor was it recognised by any other state. Following a referendum in 1969, in which 81% voted to abolish the monarchy, a republic was declared in 1970. Rhodesia continued to be internationally recognised as a British colony through 1979, when it was disestablished and the independent republic of Zimbabwe was founded in 1980, which was a member of the Commonwealth until December 2003.
	The Gambia	Elizabeth II	1970	Abolished its monarchy pursuant to a referendum; official result: 70.45% in favour of republic.
	Sierra Leone	Elizabeth II	1971	Abolished its monarchy after adopting a new republican constitution.
Sri Lanka	Ceylon	Elizabeth II	1972	Abolished its monarchy after adopting a new republican constitution; country renamed to "Sri Lanka".
Afghanistan 1930	Afghanistan	Mohammed Zahir Shah	1973	Coup d'état
	Greece	Constantine II	1974	Referendum; official result: 69.18% against monarchy. A prior referendum had been organised by the military junta with 78.57% in favour of a republic, but was annulled after the junta was overthrown earlier in 1974.
	Malta	Elizabeth II	1974	Abolished its monarchy after amending its constitution.
	Ethiopia	Haile Selassie / Amha Selassie	1975	1974 coup d'état
	Sikkim	Palden Thondup Namgyal	1975	Referendum; official result: 97% to become a state of India.
	Laos	Savang Vatthana	1975	Communist takeover by the Pathet Lao.
	Trinidad and Tobago	Elizabeth II	1976	Abolished its monarchy after adopting a new republican constitution.
	Iran	Mohammad Reza Pahlavi	1979	Iranian Revolution
Central African Republic	Central Africa	Bokassa I	1979	Deposed in the French-led Operation Caban which restored his predecessor as president to power.
1980s
	Rwenzururu	Charles Mumbere	1982	Forced to abdicate by the government of Uganda; declaration of independence of Rwenzururu was annulled.
	Fiji	Elizabeth II	1987	Monarchy abolished following two coups d'état led by Sitiveni Rabuka. Elizabeth II remained recognized as paramount chief by the Great Council of Chiefs until the council's de-establishment on 14 March 2012 by Prime Minister Frank Bainimarama. Additionally, the Queen's portrait continued to feature on Fijian coins and banknotes until 2013.
1990s
	Kuwait	Jaber Al-Ahmad Al-Sabah	1990	Dethroned due to the Iraqi invasion of Kuwait. Restored in 1991 (see below).
	Mauritius	Elizabeth II	1992	Abolished its monarchy after amending its constitution.
2000s
	Samoa	Malietoa Tanumafili II	2007	Died in office after serving as O le Ao o le Malo ("Head of State") for a life tenure, triggering a constitutionally-mandated transition to the officeholder being elected for five-year terms.
	Nepal	Gyanendra	2008	Establishment of a federal republic approved by the 1st Nepalese Constituent Assembly.
	Bajhang	Vinod Bahadur	2008	Abolished by order of the republican government of Nepal.
Mustang	Lo	Jigme Dorje Palbar Bista	2008	Abolished by order of the republican government of Nepal.
2020s
	Barbados	Elizabeth II	2021	Abolished by the Constitution (Amendment) (No. 2) Act, 2021, which replaced the monarchy with the office of the President of Barbados.

== Monarchies that were restored after being abolished ==
Country	Year abolished	Notes	Year restored	Years of republic
England	1649	Commonwealth of England established during the English Civil War; restored in 1660.	1660	11
Scotland	1652	Commonwealth	1660	8
Spain	1873	First Spanish Republic established.	1874	1
Spain	1931	Second Spanish Republic established; restored (de jure) under the regency of Francisco Franco.	De jure: 1947; De facto: 1975	De jure: 16; De facto: 44
Kuwait	1990	Republic of Kuwait proclaimed prior to annexation by Iraq; restored in the Gulf War.	1991	1
Cambodia	1970	Khmer Republic established; restored as an elective monarchy.	1993	23

== See also ==
- List of current monarchies
- Criticism of monarchy
- Democratization
- List of countries by date of transition to a republican system of government
- List of last scions
- List of monarchy referendums
- List of monarchs who lost their thrones before the 17th century
- List of monarchs who lost their thrones in the 17th century
- List of monarchs who lost their thrones in the 18th century
- List of monarchs who lost their thrones in the 19th century
