= Manuel Nkomba of Kongo =

Ruler of the Kingdom of Kongo (r 1910–1911)

Manuel Nkomba was ruler of the Portuguese vassal of the Kingdom of Kongo from 1910 until 1911, when he died after only a year on the throne, which was possibly why he was excluded from the title of Manuel III, which was given to his successor Manuel III. He was the son of King Pedro VI.

Preceded by Pedro VI	Manikongo; 1910–1911	Succeeded by Manuel III
