= Álvaro XIV of Kongo =

Ruler of the Kingdom of Kongo from 1891 to 1896

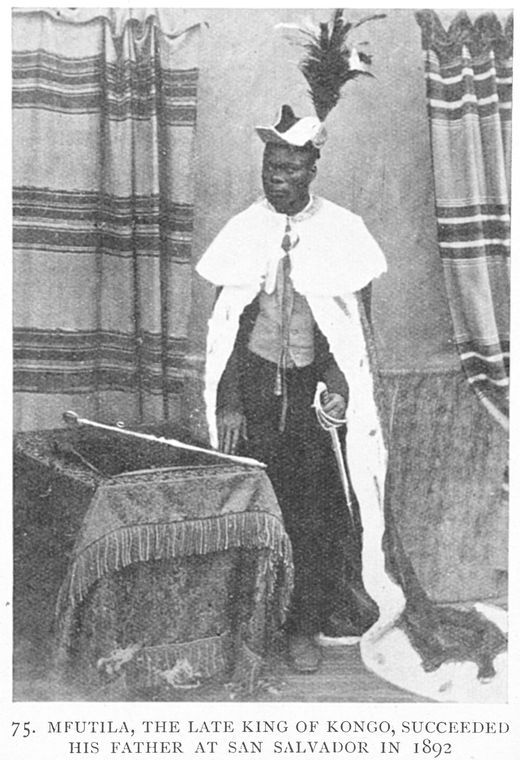
Image of the Álvaro XIV of Kongo

Água Rosada or Álvaro XIV was ruler in Kongo, Africa, from February 1891 to 1896. His father signed the vassalage of Kongo in 1888.

== Family ==
Álvaro XIV was the son of Pedro V, brother of Álvaro XIII and son of Henrique II. Henrique had split his lands between his two sons; Álvaro and Pedro. They did a swap and Pedro got Kongo on 7 August 1859. Then he signed a treaty in 1888 that Kongo would go to Portuguese rule. Then Pedro died in February 1891 and Álvaro XIV succeeded in the throne of Kongo. He was crowned in 1892 as Álvaro XIV, he died in 1896 and he was succeeded by his son Pedro VI.

Preceded by Pedro V	Manikongo; 1891–1896	Succeeded by Pedro VI (Henrique IV regented until 1901)
