= List of countries by date of transition to a republican system of government =

This is a list of countries by date of their last transition from a monarchy to a republican form of government. There were two periods in recent history when many such transitions took place:

- during or within five years after World War I (1914–1923) – marked in green;
- during or within five years after World War II (1939–1950) – marked in pink.

Some of the countries on this list were part of larger, now extinct, states (such as the Russian Empire or Yugoslavia) when the transition to a republic took place. Countries that have always had non-republican forms of government (such as absolute monarchy, theocracy, etc.) are not included in this list. Some were also independent states that shared their head of state with other countries (such as Denmark or the United Kingdom) before abolishing the link with the shared monarchy. Countries marked in yellow have since ceased to be republics in favour of another form of government.

== List of countries/regions ==
Legend
Later restored to non-republican form of government (usually monarchy or conquest by a monarchical state)
Later transition to empire
Transition during or following World War I (1914–1923)
Transition during or following World War II (1939–1950)

Country/region	Date of transition	Remarks
Vaishali	Circa 623 BC	The Vajjika League of Vrijji mahajanapada in modern-day Bihar in India was established here prior to the birth of Gautama Buddha which happened in Lumbini in 623BC. Vaiśālī was the capital of the republican Licchavi state. In 468 BCE the Vajjika League was conquered by the Kingdom of Magadha, becoming an extinct state.
Rome	Circa 509 BC	Establishment of the Roman Republic following the overthrow of the Roman monarchy. Later succeeded by the monarchical Roman Empire following the proclamation of Gaius Octavius as Augustus on 16 January 27 BC and subsequent constitutional reforms. In 395 AD the empire would split in two permanently. The Western Roman Empire became an extinct state in 476 AD. The Eastern Roman Empire, called the Byzantine Empire by later historians, continued until 1453 when Ottoman forces conquered the city of Constantinople.
San Marino	3 September 301	Republic founded for San Marino (traditional date)
Novgorod Republic, Russia	1136	The Novgorod Republic, formally known as Lord Novgorod the Great, was a city-state that existed from the 12th to 15th centuries in northwestern Russia, stretching from the Gulf of Finland in the west to the Ural Mountains in the east. Its capital was the city of Novgorod. The republic prospered as the easternmost trading post of the Hanseatic League, and its people were much influenced by the culture of the Byzantines, with the Novgorod school of icon painting producing many fine works. For much of its history, Novgorod was the center of Russian art and culture.
Pskov Republic, Russia	1348	The government of the Pskov Republic consisted of the veche (popular assembly), posadnichestvo (mayoralty) and the prince (directly or through a viceroy). Mayors (posadniki) from all parts of the city, together with one or more lord mayors and former mayors formed the Council of Lords (sovet gospod, boyarskiy sovet), which was the main executive organ of the state
Poland	1 July 1569	Establishment of the Polish–Lithuanian Commonwealth as a result of the Union of Lublin. Poland-Lithuania was often referred to as a republic under the presidency of the King, having a King who reigns and does not rule and the Parliament being responsible for governance. In Polish, the Commonwealth is known as the First Polish Republic (Polish: Pierwsza Rzeczpospolita), or literally as the Republic of Both Nations (Polish: Rzeczpospolita Obojga Narodów), whilst formally being the Kingdom of Poland and Grand Duchy of Lithuania (Polish: Królestwo Polskie i Wielkie Księstwo Litewskie). The Polish–Lithuanian Commonwealth came to an end in 1796, with the Third Partition of Poland.
Lithuania	1 July 1569	
Netherlands	26 July 1581	The Republic of the Seven United Netherlands declared its independence from King Philip II of Spain on 26 July 1581, with the Act of Abjuration, and became the Batavian Republic in 1795. The Kingdom of Holland was formed on 5 June 1806.
Switzerland	24 October 1648	Switzerland became independent from the Holy Roman Empire by the Treaty of Westphalia
England	19 May 1649	The Commonwealth of England, later known as the Protectorate, was established on 19 May 1649, following the execution of King Charles I. The monarchy was restored on 29 May 1660.
Algeria	June 1659	In 1659, the division of governance in the Regency of Algiers between the Pashas appointed by the Ottoman Porte and the Janissary Odjak of Algiers came to an end. The regency became a de faco independent military republic, with power initially concentrated in the Agha, who served as the president of the diwan. From 1671 onward, authority was vested in the Dey of Algiers. Algeria was legally a territory of the Ottoman Empire, but in practice it acted as an independent country in relation to Constantinople. In 1830, Algeria was conquered by the Kingdom of France as a constituent territory.
United States	4 July 1776	On July 4, 1776, Thirteen British Colonies in North America declared its independence (and therefore also its separation) from the Kingdom of Great Britain. On March 1, 1781, these 13 states officially organized itselves in a Confederation. Great Britain only recognized the independence of the United States of America and its territorial loss on September 3, 1783. The present U.S. constitution became effective, establishing the current U.S. government on March 4, 1789.
France	21 September 1792	Founded by the French Revolution. During the Revolution, the French Monarchy was overthrown and a National Convention established. The first act of the Convention was to strip the King of his powers and to declare the First French Republic. After several changes to the governance of the Republic it came to an end in 1804 when Napoleon was declared Emperor of the French and the First French Empire was established.
Colombia (New Granada)	20 July 1811	On 20 July 1811, the New Kingdom of Granada declared its independence (and therefore also its separation) from the Kingdom of Spain, forming the United Provinces of New Granada, a republican state. The Bogotá Province decided to not join the new country and declared itself the Free and Independent State of Cundinamarca, a monarchical state that still recognized the authority of the king of Spain. On 3 September 1816 Venezuela is reconquered by the Spanish Empire, which reestablishes the New Kingdom of Granada.
Venezuela	5 July 1811	On 5 July 1811, the Captaincy General of Venezuela declared its independence (and therefore also its separation) from the Kingdom of Spain, forming the First Republic of Venezuela. On 25 July 1812 Venezuela is reconquered by the Spanish Empire, which reestablishes the Captaincy General of Venezuela.
Colombia (Cundinamarca)	19 September 1812	The 1811 Constitution of the Free and Independent State of Cundinamarca is reformed. A republican system of government is established and the authority of the King of Spain is completely eliminated. On 12 December 1814 the country is conquered by the United Provinces of New Granada, this later reconquered by the Spanish Empire in 1816, which reestablished the New Kingdom of Granada.
Venezuela	7 August 1813	In the Admirable Campaign, the Second Republic of Venezuela is declared. The Republic came to an end in the following year, when Caracas was reoccupied by the Royalists on 16 July 1814.
Paraguay	12 October 1813	Republic proclaimed after independence from Spain on 14 May 1811. The Kingdom of Spain only recognized the independence of Paraguay on 10 September 1880
Argentina	9 July 1816	Independence won from the Spanish Empire. Between 1810 and 1816 the United Provinces of the Río de la Plata recognized the authority of the king of Spain. On 9 July 1816 the country declared itself an independent republic in relation to the Kingdom of Spain due to the refusal of King Ferdinand VII to accept constitutional rule both in the Peninsula (Spain) and overseas. Republican constitutions of 1819 and 1826 led to the adoption of the 1853 text. The Kingdom of Spain only recognized the independence of Argentina on July 9, 1859.
Venezuela	19 July 1817	Third Republic of Venezuela established by Simon Bolivar. The Republic ended, after the Congress of Angostura of 1819 decreed the union of Venezuela with New Granada, to form the Republic of Gran Colombia. On 24 September 1830, in the Congress of Valencia, Venezuela separated from Colombia and Ecuador. The Kingdom of Spain only recognized Venezuela's independence on 29 March 1845.
Chile	12 February 1818	Independence declared from the Spanish Empire. Between 1810 and 1814 there were republican governments although nominally remained loyal to the Spanish monarchy. In 1817 there was re-established the independentist government and established a republican system in different constitutional texts. The Kingdom of Spain only recognized Chile's independence on 25 April 1844.
Colombia	17 December 1819	Republic of Colombia declared during Congress of Angostura, becoming independent (and therefore separates) from the Kingdom of Spain definitively. The Kingdom of Spain only recognized Colombia's independence on 30 January 1888. On November 3, 1903, Panama separated from Colombia, also adopting a republican government.
Panama	17 December 1819	Republic of Colombia declared during Congress of Angostura, becoming independent (and therefore separates) from the Kingdom of Spain definitively. The Kingdom of Spain only recognized Colombia's independence on 30 January 1888. On November 3, 1903, Panama separated from Colombia, also adopting a republican government.
Ecuador	24 May 1822	Incorporated into Republic of Colombia, end of Royal Audiencia of Quito, a judicial district of the Spanish Empire. On 13 May 1830 Ecuador separated from Colombia. The Kingdom of Spain only recognized Ecuador's independence on 16 February 1840.
Mexico	31 March 1823	Mexico was the only former viceroyalty of the Spanish Empire to establish a monarchy after gaining independence from the Kingdom of Spain. In May 1822, Agostín de Iturbide was acclaimed Emperor, with the title of Agostín I. However, relations with Congress deteriorated, and the monarch ordered its closure in late October of that year, beginning to govern through a junta, which caused him to lose popularity among the elite and the military. The republic was proclaimed and the emperor was forced to resign and go into exile. He returned to Mexico in 1824, but was arrested and executed shortly thereafter.
Costa Rica	1 July 1823	Independence of United Provinces of Central America. After Central America (then the Captaincy General of Guatemala) declared its independence from the Kingdom of Spain in September 1821, it was annexed by the First Mexican Empire in January 1822 before regaining its independence and forming a federal republic in 1823. The republic descended into civil wars from 1827 to 1829 and from 1838 to 1840, by the end of which the states of Central America declared independence as new republics and the federal republic ceased to exist. The Kingdom of Spain recognized the independence of these countries only in the 1850s (Costa Rica and Nicaragua), 1860s (Guatemala and El Salvador) and in the 1890s (Honduras).
El Salvador	1 July 1823	
Guatemala	1 July 1823	
Honduras	1 July 1823	
Nicaragua	1 July 1823	
Peru	20 July 1822	Peru formally proclaimed independence from Spain in 1821 as the Protectorate of Peru. At the Guayaquil Conference, José de San Martín and Simón Bolívar tried to decide Peru's political fate. San Martín argued for a constitutional monarchy, and Bolivar wanted a republic; both sought independence from Spain. San Martín left Peru on 22 September 1822, and left the independence movement's command to Bolívar. Constituent Congress founded the republic. Royalists were defeated in the Battle of Ayacucho; the Kingdom of Spain did not recognize the independence of the republic on 14 August 1879.
Bolivia	6 August 1825	Constitutional congress declared Bolivia as an independent republic in relation to the Kingdom of Spain. Kingdom of Spain only recognized the independence of the new republic on 21 July 1847
Uruguay	18 July 1830	Declared its independence from the Empire of Brazil as a republican state. Promulgation of the first Uruguayan constitution
France	1848	Following the defeat of Napoleon at the Battle of Waterloo there was a period of turmoil during which the Bourbon Restoration was overthrown by citizens who established the French Second Republic. This second French Republic was itself short-lived and overthrown when Louis-Napoleon conducted the 1851 self-coup d'etat and declared himself Emperor Napoleon III. At the time, Algeria was part of French territory as an integral part of the country.
Algeria	1848	Following the defeat of Napoleon at the Battle of Waterloo there was a period of turmoil during which the Bourbon Restoration was overthrown by citizens who established the French Second Republic. This second French Republic was itself short-lived and overthrown when Louis-Napoleon conducted the 1851 self-coup d'etat and declared himself Emperor Napoleon III. At the time, Algeria was part of French territory as an integral part of the country.
Liberia	26 July 1847	Independent Republic of Liberia created
Haiti	15 January 1859	Abdication of Emperor Faustin
Dominican Republic	25 March 1865	Adoption of new constitution near end of Dominican Restoration War
Mexico	15 July 1867	In 1861, French, Spanish, and British ships landed in Mexico and began invading the country, claiming the Mexican government owed debts to these European powers. Due to disagreements over how to collect the debts, the United Kingdom and Spain abandoned the venture, and France continued the invasion, reaching Mexico City on 10 June 1863. Emperor Napoleon III of France transformed Mexico back into an empire and crowned an ally, the Austrian Prince Maximilian of Habsburg, as the country's monarch. After four years Emperor Maxmilian I was executed and the Federal Republic officially restored
France	4 September 1870	Emperor Napoleon III deposed and French Third Republic proclaimed as a result of the Franco-Prussian War. In the following decades the French republican government annexed (and therefore in the process also abolished) several native monarchies in Africa, Asia and in the Pacific Islands. On the eve of World War I, France's colonial empire (although the word empire is used here, the colonial empire had a republican government) was the second-largest in the world after the monarchical British Empire.
Algeria	4 September 1870	Republican government instituted when French mother country became a republic
Ivory Coast	4 September 1870	Republican government instituted when French mother country became a republic
Mauritania	4 September 1870	Republican government instituted when French mother country became a republic
Senegal	4 September 1870	Republican government instituted when French mother country became a republic
Brazil	15 November 1889	Emperor Pedro II deposed and Brazilian Republic proclaimed by Marshal Deodoro da Fonseca
Hawaii	4 July 1894	Queen Liliʻuokalani deposed and republic proclaimed following a provisional government
Madagascar	28 February 1897	End of Merina Kingdom
Philippines	23 January 1899	First Philippine Republic. (Note: This polity was not recognized during its existence, but is considered by the current Philippine government to have been legitimate. Sovereignty remained with Spain pending ratification of the Treaty of Paris, which had been concluded on 10 December 1898, and passed to the United States with the exchange of ratifications on 11 April 1899. The Philippine Assembly, a representative legislative body, was inaugurated under US sovereignty on 16 October 1907. The Republic of the Philippines became a sovereign nation on 4 July 1946.)
Cuba	20 May 1902	Independence as Republic of Cuba following United States Military Government after the end of the Spanish–American War
Portugal	5 October 1910	King Manuel II deposed and Portuguese First Republic proclaimed as a result of the 1910 revolution. The First Republic was overthrown by the 1926 coup d'état that instated the Ditadura Nacional military dictatorship followed by the corporatist Estado Novo which lasted until it was overthrown by the Carnation Revolution on 25 April 1974, and democracy was eventually restored.
Angola	5 October 1910	Republican government instituted when Portuguese mother country became a republic. Subjected to the Estado Novo until 1974.
Cape Verde	5 October 1910	Republican government instituted when Portuguese mother country became a republic. Subjected to the Estado Novo until 1974.
East Timor	5 October 1910	Republican government instituted when Portuguese mother country became a republic. Subjected to the Estado Novo until 1974.
Guinea-Bissau	5 October 1910	Republican government instituted when Portuguese mother country became a republic. Subjected to the Estado Novo until 1974.
Mozambique	5 October 1910	Republican government instituted when Portuguese mother country became a republic. Subjected to the Estado Novo until 1974.
São Tomé and Príncipe	5 October 1910	Republican government instituted when Portuguese mother country became a republic. Subjected to the Estado Novo until 1974.
China	1 January 1912	Republic of China (ROC) proclaimed as a result of the Xinhai Revolution. The ROC was initially in control of mainland China but later relocated to Taiwan. It is now commonly known as "Taiwan". The People's Republic of China was proclaimed on 1 October 1949, and is now in control of mainland China. It is commonly known as "China".
Comoros	1912	End of last of indigenous sultanates
Armenia	14 September 1917	Emperor Nicholas II of Russia abdicated as a result of the February Revolution and Russia was proclaimed a republic
Azerbaijan	14 September 1917	Emperor Nicholas II of Russia abdicated as a result of the February Revolution and Russia was proclaimed a republic
Belarus	14 September 1917	Emperor Nicholas II of Russia abdicated as a result of the February Revolution and Russia was proclaimed a republic
Estonia	14 September 1917	Emperor Nicholas II of Russia abdicated as a result of the February Revolution and Russia was proclaimed a republic
Georgia	14 September 1917	Emperor Nicholas II of Russia abdicated as a result of the February Revolution and Russia was proclaimed a republic
Kazakhstan	14 September 1917	Emperor Nicholas II of Russia abdicated as a result of the February Revolution and Russia was proclaimed a republic
Kyrgyzstan	14 September 1917	Emperor Nicholas II of Russia abdicated as a result of the February Revolution and Russia was proclaimed a republic
Latvia	14 September 1917	Emperor Nicholas II of Russia abdicated as a result of the February Revolution and Russia was proclaimed a republic
Russia	14 September 1917	Emperor Nicholas II of Russia abdicated as a result of the February Revolution and Russia was proclaimed a republic
Ukraine	14 September 1917	Emperor Nicholas II of Russia abdicated as a result of the February Revolution and Russia was proclaimed a republic
Poland	7 October 1918	After more than a century of partitions between the Austrian, Prussian and Russian imperial powers, Poland re-emerged as a sovereign state at the end of the First World War in Europe.
Czech Republic	18 October 1918	Czechoslovak Republic proclaimed
Slovakia	18 October 1918	Czechoslovak Republic proclaimed
Germany	9 November 1918	Emperor William II abdicated as a result of the German Revolution
Austria	12 November 1918	Republic of German Austria proclaimed following the dethronement of Emperor Charles
Finland	14 December 1918	King Frederic Charles renounced the throne
Turkmenistan	26 April 1920	Khan Sayid Abdullah deposed and Khorezm People's Soviet Republic proclaimed
Lebanon	23 July 1920	French Mandate of Syria established after the Battle of Maysalun
Syria	23 July 1920	French Mandate of Syria established after the Battle of Maysalun
Tajikistan	8 October 1920	Emir Mohammed Alim Khan deposed and Bukharan People's Republic proclaimed
Uzbekistan	8 October 1920	Emir Mohammed Alim Khan deposed and Bukharan People's Republic proclaimed
Togo	20 July 1922	Formal beginning of French Togoland League of Nations Mandate
Turkey	29 October 1923	Republic of Turkey was proclaimed after the Turkish War of Independence, succeeding the Ottoman Empire
Mongolia	26 November 1924	Mongolian People's Republic proclaimed (Note: This polity was not recognized by many countries between 1940 and 1960 due to Outer Mongolia being part of the Republic of China. The ROC recognized Mongolia's independence in 1946, cancelled in 1953 and the independence-minded government re-recognized it in 2002.)
Spain	14 April 1931	The Second Spanish Republic came to power on 14 April 1931, following the economic crisis caused by the 1929 Wall Street Crash. The Republic lost power after the Spanish Civil War. Francisco Franco then led Spain until his death on 20 November 1975, when democracy was restored.
Moldova	2 August 1940	Moldavian Soviet Socialist Republic proclaimed following the annexation of Romanian Bessarabia by the Soviet Union
Iceland	17 June 1944	Republic of Iceland established after a referendum
North Korea	15 August 1945	Korea liberated from Japan and the People's Republic of Korea established, divided into North Korea and South Korea a month later.
South Korea	15 August 1945	Korea liberated from Japan and the People's Republic of Korea established, divided into North Korea and South Korea a month later.
Indonesia	17 August 1945	Republic of Indonesia's proclamation of independence triggering the Indonesian National Revolution
Vietnam	25 August 1945	Emperor Bảo Đại abdicated and Democratic Republic of Vietnam was proclaimed in the north, State of Vietnam then Republic of Vietnam proclaimed in the south.
Taiwan	25 October 1945	Taiwan and Penghu Islands transferred to the Republic of China. Since 1949, the ROC only controls Taiwan and the surrounding islands. (Note: See also Political status of Taiwan.)
Bosnia and Herzegovina	29 November 1945	Socialist Federal Republic of Yugoslavia proclaimed while King Peter II was in exile
Croatia	29 November 1945	Socialist Federal Republic of Yugoslavia proclaimed while King Peter II was in exile
North Macedonia	29 November 1945	Socialist Federal Republic of Yugoslavia proclaimed while King Peter II was in exile
Montenegro	29 November 1945	Socialist Federal Republic of Yugoslavia proclaimed while King Peter II was in exile
Serbia	29 November 1945	Socialist Federal Republic of Yugoslavia proclaimed while King Peter II was in exile
Slovenia	29 November 1945	Socialist Federal Republic of Yugoslavia proclaimed while King Peter II was in exile
Albania	1 January 1946	People's Republic of Albania proclaimed while King Zog was in exile
Hungary	1 February 1946	Second Hungarian Republic proclaimed
Italy	12 June 1946	King Umberto II renounced the throne and the Italian Republic was established after a referendum
Bulgaria	15 September 1946	Tsar Simeon II deposed and People's Republic of Bulgaria proclaimed after a referendum
Marshall Islands	18 July 1947	End of South Seas Mandate and beginning of Trust Territory of the Pacific Islands
Federated States of Micronesia	18 July 1947	End of South Seas Mandate and beginning of Trust Territory of the Pacific Islands
Palau	18 July 1947	End of South Seas Mandate and beginning of Trust Territory of the Pacific Islands
Romania	30 December 1947	King Michael abdicated and the People's Republic of Romania was proclaimed
Myanmar	4 January 1948	Burmese independence declared
Israel	14 May 1948	State of Israel proclaimed
Palestine	1 October 1948	Palestinian statehood proclaimed (Note: Although the All-Palestine Protectorate had claimed jurisdiction of the former Mandatory Palestine, this entity only controlled the Gaza Strip and this government was recognized by Egypt, Iraq, Lebanon, Saudi Arabia, Syria and Yemen; not recognized by Transjordan, who would annex the West Bank in 1950. Both regions were captured by Israel in 1967 after the Six-Day War. On 15 November 1988, exactly 40 years after the 1948 declaration, the modern State of Palestine was established by the Palestine Liberation Organization in Algiers. After the Oslo Accords in 1993, the Palestinian Authority was set up to administer the West Bank and the Gaza Strip, in which the latter is now ruled by Hamas since 2007.)
Ireland	18 April 1949	Republic of Ireland Act came into force
India	26 January 1950	Constitution of India came into effect
Egypt	18 June 1953	Republic proclaimed after revolution in 1952
Sudan	1 January 1956	Independence of Republic of Sudan
South Sudan	1 January 1956	Independence of Republic of Sudan
Pakistan	23 March 1956	Constitution of Pakistan came into effect and Governor General Iskander Mirza became president. Three coups in 1958 Pakistani coup d'état, 1977 and in 1999 respectively before restoration of civil electorate in 2008.
Bangladesh	23 March 1956	Constitution of Pakistan came into effect and Governor General Iskander Mirza became president. Three coups in 1958 Pakistani coup d'état, 1977 and in 1999 respectively before restoration of civil electorate in 2008.
Tunisia	25 July 1957	King Muhammad VIII al-Amin deposed
Iraq	14 July 1958	Faisal II deposed/killed in 14 July Revolution
Guinea	2 October 1958	Gained independence as a republic
Tibet	23 March 1959	The unrecognized de facto state of Tibet was annexed by the People's Republic of China and its political system was eliminated in 1959 (Note: This polity was not recognized by all countries as it was integral part of China, though the Central Tibetan Administration asserted that Tibet was an independent state without international recognition until the PRC invaded Tibet in 1949/1950.)
Mali	20 June 1960	Gained independence as a republic
Somalia	26 June 1960	Independence of State of Somaliland, which was united with the Trust Territory of Somalia on 1 July to form the Somali Republic
Democratic Republic of the Congo	30 June 1960	Gained independence as a republic
Ghana	1 July 1960	Constitutional change after referendum on 27 April
Cyprus	16 August 1960	Gained independence as a republic
South Africa	31 May 1961	Republican constitution adopted
Cameroon	1 October 1961	End of British Trusteeship in Southern Cameroons, union with rest of Cameroon
Samoa	1 January 1962	Gained independence as a republic
Rwanda	1 July 1962	Independence as a republic following monarchy referendum in 1961
Yemen	27 September 1962	King Muhammad al-Badr deposed and Yemen Arab Republic (North Yemen) proclaimed
Tanganyika	9 December 1962	Republican constitution adopted
Nigeria	1 October 1963	Constitutional amendment
Uganda	9 October 1963	Constitutional amendment
Zanzibar	12 January 1964	Sultanate overthrown in Zanzibar Revolution
Zambia	24 October 1964	Gained independence as a republic
Kenya	12 December 1964	Republican constitution adopted
Singapore	9 August 1965	Ousted from the Federation of Malaysia
Malawi	6 July 1966	Republican constitution adopted
Botswana	30 September 1966	Gained independence as a republic
Burundi	28 November 1966	Republic declared after army coup d'état
South Yemen	30 November 1967	Independence of People's Republic of South Yemen
Nauru	31 January 1968	Gained independence as a republic
Equatorial Guinea	12 October 1968	Gained independence as a republic
Maldives	11 November 1968	Sultan Muhammad Fareed Didi deposed and Maldivian Second Republic established after a referendum
Libya	1 September 1969	King Idris I deposed by Muammar Gaddafi's coup d'état
Guyana	23 February 1970	Co-operative Republic of Guyana proclaimed
Cambodia	18 March 1970	The Khmer Republic (later known as Democratic Kampuchea, then the People's Republic of Kampuchea, and finally the State of Cambodia) was declared in 1970 when Prince Norodom Sihanouk was deposed. The monarchy was restored in 1993.
The Gambia	24 April 1970	Republic proclaimed following constitutional referendum
Sierra Leone	19 April 1971	Republican constitution adopted
Sri Lanka	22 May 1972	Sri Lankan constitution adopted
Bangladesh	16 December 1972	Constitution came into effect after a year of formation of state in 1972. Three coups followed in 1975 and 1982.
Afghanistan	17 July 1973	King Mohammed Zahir Shah abdicated after Mohammed Daoud Khan's coup d'état. Era of republican governance ended in 2021 when the Taliban returned to power (Note: During the first Taliban government from 1996 to 2001, the republican Islamic State of Afghanistan remained in power in parts of the country.) and changed the government to a theocratic emirate.
Greece	8 December 1974	Final abolition of monarchy; referendum
Malta	13 December 1974	Republic of Malta proclaimed
Eritrea	21 March 1975	Monarchy of Ethiopian Empire finally abolished
Ethiopia	21 March 1975	Monarchy of Ethiopian Empire finally abolished
Suriname	25 November 1975	Gained independence as a republic
Laos	2 December 1975	King Savang Vatthana abdicated as a result of a communist revolution
Seychelles	29 June 1976	Gained independence as a republic
Trinidad and Tobago	1 August 1976	Republican constitution adopted
Dominica	3 November 1978	Gained independence as a republic
Iran	11 February 1979	Shah Mohammad Reza Pahlavi deposed and Islamic Republic of Iran (a theocratic republic) proclaimed as a result of the Iranian Revolution
Kiribati	12 July 1979	Gained independence as a republic
Central African Empire	21 September 1979	Emperor Bokassa I deposed in a coup d'état, restoring the Central African Republic.
Zimbabwe	17 April 1980	Full independence of Zimbabwe
Fiji	6 October 1987	Fiji Republic proclaimed as a result of the coup d'état of Sitiveni Rabuka
Mauritius	12 March 1992	Republic of Mauritius proclaimed as a result of constitutional changes
Nepal	28 May 2008	Abolition of monarchy
Barbados	30 November 2021	Proclaimed itself a republic via constitutional changes

== See also ==
- Abolition of monarchy
- List of countries by system of government
- List of political systems in France

== Sources ==
- Agoncillo, Teodoro (1990) [1960], History of the Filipino People (Eighth ed.), R.P. Garcia Publishing Company, ISBN 971-10-2415-2
- Zaide, Sonia M. (1994), "Chapter 20. First Republic in Asia", The Philippines: A Unique Nation, All-Nations Publishing Co., pp. 263–277, ISBN 971-642-071-4
