= Henrique IV of Kongo =

Henrique IV or Tekenge was regent of the Portuguese vassal of the Kingdom of Kongo from 1896 until 1901, when his nephew Pedro VI rose to majority.

Preceded by Alvaro XIV	Regent; 1896–1901	Succeeded by Pedro VI
