= Pedro V of Kongo =

Pedro V
- Manikongo
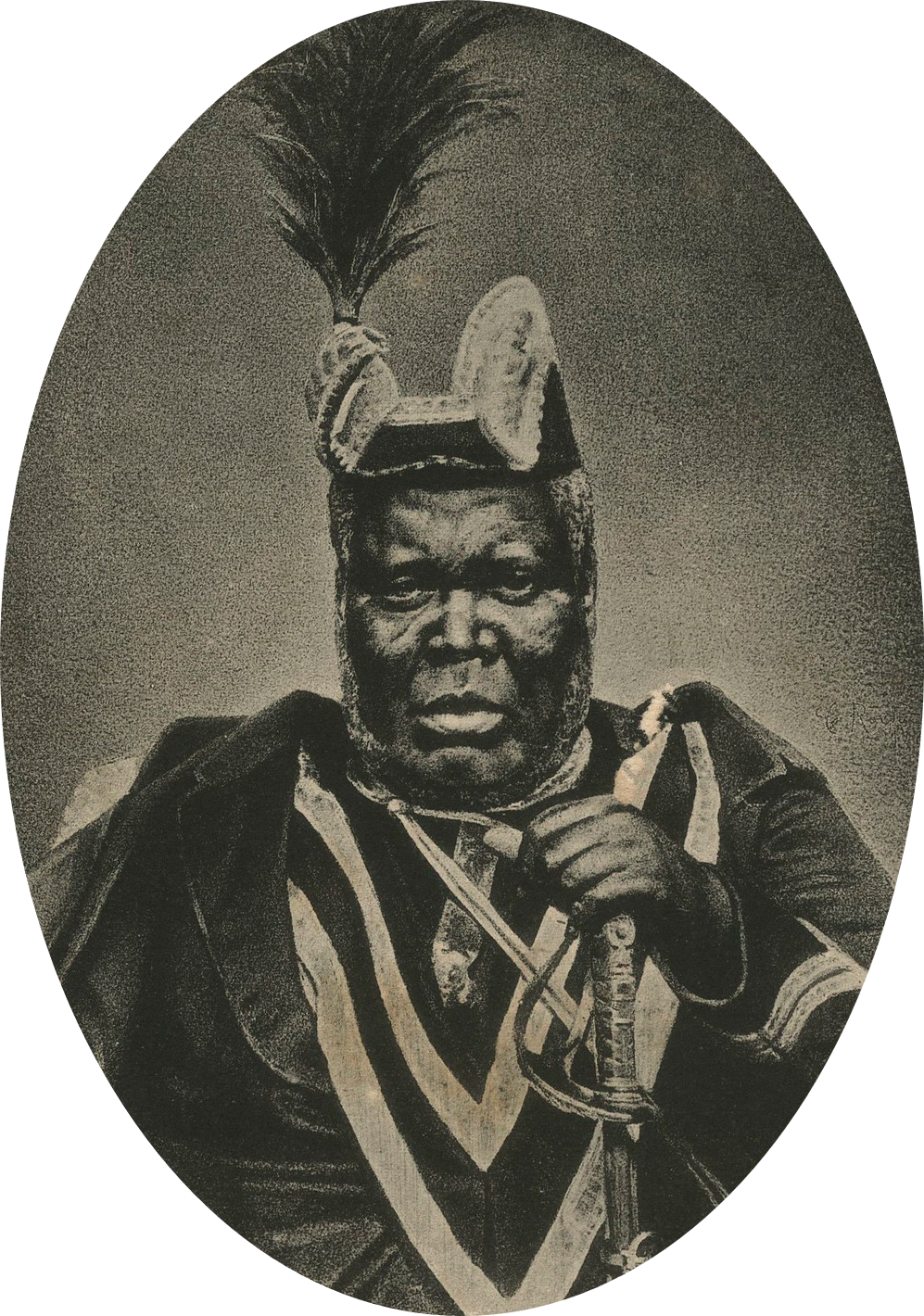
- Pedro V, photographed by Cunha Moraes, c. 1885

King of Kongo
- Reign: 7 August 1859 – February 1891
- Predecessor: Álvaro XIII
- Successor: Álvaro XIV
- Died: February 1891
- House: Kinlaza

Pedro V Elelo (died February 1891) was king of Kongo from 7 August 1859 to February 1891. His base was in the district of Madimba, which lay south of the capital and was in the lands held by the ancient southern branch of the Kinlaza lineage called Kivuzi.

== Name ==
Pedro V was at least the sixth king Pedro to rule Kongo, but from the very beginning of his reign, he signed his correspondence as Pedro V, thus ignoring the Pedro V who had ruled from 1763 to 1764 before being expelled by Alvaro XI. Scholars are unsure as to why he persisted in this error. Other kings, such as Alvaro XIII, were better conscious of the names of earlier kings named Alvaro over a longer period of time, and the kinglist was well known; a copy of one had been in the capital São Salvador since at least 1844. One theory is that he took the name Pedro V in honor of the ruling Portuguese king, who was Pedro V.

== Succession ==
He was the son of a sister of his predecessor Henrique II, and the succession was a contested one, which matched him against Alvaro XIII Ndongo. The electors chose Alvaro XIII to rule, but Pedro, who was expelled from the city, sought the assistance of the Portuguese, who had recently occupied Bembe, located to the south of his core domains. In order to obtain this aid, Pedro swore vassalage to Portugal, the first Kongo king ever to do so. With Portuguese assistance, he was able, after a long struggle, to capture São Salvador and drive Alvaro out.

== Reign ==
Once in power, Pedro worked to strengthen his position, first by using the presence of Portuguese priests to arm his closest followers as Knights of the Order of Christ, and to arrange for the burial of several long dead high ranking Kongo. He also managed to re-concentrate population in São Salvador and rebuild the capital.

Pedro benefited from the transformation of Kongo's economy in the mid-nineteenth century, in which the so-called legitimate trade replaced the export slave trade as Kongo's primary foreign trade. Kongo exported peanuts, ivory and other exotic products to European traders, both Portuguese from Luanda in the colony of Angola, and French, Dutch and English merchants who had been based at Boma, on the Congo River. Pedro managed to win the loyalty of the petty local rulers who controlled that route, and they accepted knighthoods in exchange. He then welcomed factors of the various houses to the capital of São Salvador.

However the new trade links which helped Pedro to gain financial stability and make São Salvador a major commercial center also had its cost. The transformation of the Kongo economy, in common with that of other parts of Central Africa, was in the grips of a "trade revolution" which often put formerly weak local rulers in powerful positions. Pedro faced a major challenge on this front from Garcia Bwaka Matu, whose town of Makuta to the east of São Salvador had become an important trading hub. Bwaka Matu controlled trade and often denied Pedro access to lucrative markets and posed a serious threat from the early 1870s until Bwaka Matu's death in 1881.

Although Pedro had been placed in power by the Portuguese and had accepted vassalage and they in turn had left a garrison in São Salvador, in 1870 the Portuguese decided to withdraw from São Salvador, leaving Pedro in full command. Pedro had already proven to be a problematic vassal, for in the 1860s he had supported rulers in the Dembo area (along the Angolan border) who opposed Portugal.

He was succeeded by his son Alvaro XIV Água Rosada.

== Bibliography ==
- François Bontinck (1982). "Pedro V, roi du Congo, face à la partage colonial," Africa (Rome) 37: 1–53.
- John Thornton (2000). "Kongo's Incorporation into Angola: A Perspective from Kongo," in Maria Emilia Madeira Santos, ed. A África e a instalação do sistema colonial (c. 1885-c. 1930). Lisbon: Instituto de Investigação Cientifica Tropicale
- John Thornton (2011), "Master or Dupe? The Reign of Pedro V of Kongo," Portuguese Studies Review 19, 1–2: 115–132.

== Notes ==
Preceded by Álvaro XIII	Manikongo; 1859–1891	Succeeded by Álvaro XIV
