= Pedro VI of Kongo =

Ruler of the Kingdom of Kongo (r 1896–1910)

Pedro VI or Mbemba was King of Kongo from 1896 to 1910. When he succeeded in 1896, he was too young so his uncle Henrique IV was regent until 1901. He died in 1910. It is rumoured that he may have been a grandfather of José Eduardo dos Santos. His oldest son, Nkomba, was there to succeed him in 1910 (and then he died a year later).

Preceded by Álvaro XIV (Henrique regent until 1901)	Manikongo; 1896–1910	Succeeded by Manuel Nkomba
