= Álvaro XIII of Kongo =

Ruler of the Kingdom of Kongo from 1857 to 1859

Alvaro XIII or Ndongo (died 1875) was king of Kongo from 1857 until 1859. He was a member of the Nkanga branch of the Kimpanzu house.

== Rule ==
The electors chose Álvaro XIII to rule, but his cousin, Pedro V, contested the throne. Pedro was expelled from the capital city, São Salvador, where he sought the assistance of the Portuguese, who had recently occupied Bembe, located to the south of his core domains. In order to obtain this aid, Pedro swore vassalage to Portugal, the first Kongo king ever to do so. With Portuguese assistance, he was able, after a long struggle, to capture São Salvador and drive Álvaro off the throne.

Preceded by Henrique III	Manikongo; 1857-1859	Succeeded by Pedro V
