= List of last scions =

This is a list of last scions (individuals who were the last member of a ruling house (dynasty), or other prominent family, where heredity is the prime form of inheritance). This may be the last person to rule a realm, sometimes leading to a political crisis, or a change in government; other times power has already passed from the patrilineal family, leaving it in a less important position when it reaches its extinction. Illegitimacy was rarely considered acceptable to be part of a dynasty, even if recognized by the parent.

Those who were the last scions, whether male or female, are identified in bold.

== Last scions of ruling houses ==
Dynasty	Last member	Date of extinction	Notes	Ref.
Anjou	Joanna II of Naples	1435	The most senior branch of the dynasty went extinct with **Mary** (1371–1395) and **Jadwiga** (c. 1374–1399). Jadwiga was last hereditary ruler of Poland with the first royal election being held to elect a husband. **Joanna II** (1371–1435) was the last member of the dynasty and was unable to produce an heir.	
Aviz	Henrique, Cardinal-King of Portugal	1580	The dynasty was an illegitimate branch of its predecessor the House of Burgundy. The new dynasty ruled Portugal from 1385 to 1580. António, Prior of Crato would briefly rule Portugal shortly thereafter. His illegitimate birth contests his claim to be considered a member of the House of Aviz.	
Barcelona	Joanna de Urgell i Arago	1455	**Martin of Aragón** was the last legitimate member to rule over Aragón. The rule of the House of Barcelona itself came to an end after the death of **James II, Count of Urgell**, when the county was incorporated to Aragón. With James' death, his daughter, **Joanna**, wife to John I, Count of Foix and remarried as a widow to John Ramon III, Count of Cardona, became the last Barcelona.	
Bourbon (main line)	Henri, comte de Chambord	1883	The main line of the House of Bourbon had ruled France from 1589 to 1793 and from 1814 to 1830. This line became extinct with the death of **Henri** (1820–1883), King Charles X's grandson. The comte de Chambord was the last male-line descendant of King Louis XV. Many other lines of the house of Bourbon survive, including the Spanish Royal Family, the Grand Ducal Family of Luxembourg, and pretenders to the thrones of numerous other European thrones. They are all descendants of Henry IV of France, and ultimately descent from Hugh Capet of the House of Capet.	
Bruce	David II of Scotland	1371	The Clan Bruce ruled Scotland from 1306 to 1371. Its last royal member was **David II** (1324–1371), who died without issue. Upon David's death, the throne passed to his nephew Robert Stewart. The Clan continues today through other lines, which do not have patrilineal royal ancestry. The current clan chief, Andrew Bruce, 11th Earl of Elgin, is descended from King Robert Bruce in the female line.	
Burgundy (Portuguese branch)	Beatrice of Portugal	1408	A branch of the House of Burgundy, itself a branch of the House of Capet, was the first ruling house of the Kingdom of Portugal in 1139. Its last male member was **Ferdinand I** (1345–1383). His daughter **Beatrice** (1372–1408) was the disputed queen for two years, as well as queen of Castile and León by marriage. Instead Ferdinand's illegitimate half-brother John, Grand Master of the Order of Aviz became king, forming the House of Aviz.	
Dunkeld	Alexander III of Scotland	1286	**Alexander's** death ended the family's rule over Scotland, which had persisted since 1058. He was the last male-line descendant of King Donnchad I (reigned 1034 to 1040). Alexander had outlived his own children, leaving only his granddaughter (though his daughter) Margaret, Maid of Norway as heir to the dynasty. Margaret's death a few years later plunged Scotland into an interregnum.	
Évreux	Blanche I of Navarre	1441	With **Charles III's** (1361–1425) death, the dynasty's agnatic line came to an end. The dynasty's last member was his daughter, **Blanche I** (1387–1441).	
Habsburg	Maria Theresa	1780	Male Habsburgs held many regnal titles in Europe between the twelfth and the eighteenth century. Their most important titles were those of the Holy Roman Emperor (and its German associate and predecessor titles) and the King of Spain. The dynasty's last male scion was **Charles VI** (1685–1740). His daughter **Maria Theresa** (1717–1780) succeeded to some of her father's titles by inheritance. She gained power over the rest of her father's domains when her husband was elected Emperor. She was the last member of the royal house. Her descendants, the House of Lorraine, continued to hold this power and were styled the House of Habsburg-Lorraine.	
Hohenstaufen	Henry of Sicily	1318	After the death of **Frederick II** (1194–1250), the influence of the dynasty collapsed. **Manfred** (1232–1266) was himself a son of Frederick II born out of wedlock, who had been legitimised by the posterior marriage of his parents on his mother's deathbed. The last member of the dynasty was Manfred's son, Henry [Enrico], who died in captivity at Castel dell'Ovo on 31 October 1318. Therefore, his son, Henry [Enrico] (May 1262 – 31 October 1318), was the last Hohenstaufen who could have claimed full dynastic rights, albeit not being the last agnatic descendant of the family. In fact, the last patrilineal descendant was Henry's first cousin once removed, Giovanna di Stevia (1280–1352), a daughter of Conrad, and granddaughter of Frederick of Antioch, also an illegitimate son of Frederick II. Frederick's grandson **Conradin** (1252–1268) was the last male member who sought to reclaim the Sicilian throne. Manfred's daughter **Constance II** (c. 1249–1302) was able to become queen of Sicily in 1282 becoming the last reigning member of the dynasty.	
Jagiellonian	Anna Jagiellon	1596	The last male ruler of the Jagiellonian dynasty was **Sigismund II Augustus** (r. 1548–1572). With his death, his sister, **Anna Jagiellon** (r. 1575–1587) became the last Jagiellonian to rule over Poland and Lithuania. With Anna's death in 1596, she is believed to be the last Jagiellonian.	
Jiménez	Sancho VII of Navarre	1234	With the death of **Urraca** (1079–1126) the line of the family died out in León and Castile. The two kingdoms were inherited by Alfonso VII of León and Castile, from the House of Ivrea. **Petronilla** (1136–1173) abdicated in 1164 in favor of her son, Alfonso II of Aragón. This abdication ended the rule of the Jiménez at the Kingdom of Aragón. When **Sancho VII** (c.1157–1234) died childless, the Jiménez line died out.	
Lancaster	Henry VI of England	1471	The dynasty was also called the Lancaster branch of the House of Plantagenet. It ruled England from 1399 to 1461 and again briefly in 1470–1471. Its last scion was **King Henry VI**, who outlived his only son Edward of Westminster, Prince of Wales. Henry VI also had claims to the French throne through the parentage of his mother Catherine of Valois and the conquests of his father King Henry V.	
Luxembourg	Elisabeth of Bohemia	1442	Long before the present Grand Duchy of Luxembourg was established, the House of Luxembourg was a powerful family in Germany, supplying several Holy Roman Emperors. The last of these was **Sigismund** (1368–1437), also King of Hungary and Bohemia. His daughter **Elisabeth of Bohemia** (1409–1442) survived him to become the last Luxembourg family monarch. She ruled Hungary and Bohemia, and was also a German queen consort. Another contender was **Elizabeth of Görlitz**, who ruled as Duchess of Luxembourg. Elizabeth died in 1451. A non-imperial branch of the House descended from Henry V, Count of Luxembourg ruled as French nobles until the death of Charles II, Duke of Brienne in 1608.	
Medici	Anna Maria Luisa de' Medici	1743	**Gian Gastone de' Medici's** was the last of the Medici to reign as Grand Duke of Tuscany. With his death in 1737, his sister, **Anna Maria Luisa de' Medici**, became the last lineal descendant of the main branch of the House of Medici. With her death at age 75 on 8 February 1743, the main Medici line came to an end.	
Obrenović	Anastasia Obrenović	1933	The Obrenović dynasty competed with the Karađorđević dynasty for control of the Kingdom of Serbia. The dynasty's last male member was **Alexander I**. He was king from 1889 until 1903, when he and his wife were both murdered by soldiers in the May Coup. The Karađorđević dynasty was then restored to the throne. The last legitimate male-line member of the dynasty was **Anastasia Obrenović** (1839–1933), a cousin once removed of Milan I. A line that does not have royal ancestry still survives, descended from a maternal half-brother of Milos I.	
Orange-Nassau	Wilhelmina of the Netherlands	1962	Members of this dynasty had ruled before the Napoleonic Wars as Princes of Orange. Members later served as Kings of the Netherlands and Grand Dukes of Luxembourg since 1815. **William III** (1817–1890) outlived his three sons. He was the last male member of the house and the last person to rule both countries. His daughter **Wilhelmina** (1880–1962) succeeded him as Queen, while Luxembourg passed to the House of Nassau-Weilburg. The house became totally extinct in the male line with Wilhelmina's death. The dynasty's name is still used by her descendants, who continue to rule.	
Plantagenet and York	Margaret Pole, Countess of Salisbury	1541	The House of Plantagenet ruled England from 1154 to 1485, and had fluctuating control over parts of France. The last male member of the dynasty was **Edward Plantagenet, 17th Earl of Warwick** (1475–1499). He was a nephew of King Edward IV and great-great-grandson of King Edward III. His uncle King Richard III had been killed and replaced by Henry Tudor, who started his own royal dynasty and eventually had Warwick executed. The last legitimate male-line descendant of Henry II of England, first Plantagenet king, was Warwick's sister **Margaret Pole, 8th Countess of Salisbury** (1473–1541). She was executed by Henry Tudor's son King Henry VIII. As descendants of the earliest Dukes of York, Edward and Margaret may also be considered the last scions of the House of York or York branch of the House of Plantagenet, which ruled England specifically from 1461 to 1485 (with a brief pause in 1470–1471).	
Ptolemaic	Caesarion	30 BC	**Cleopatra** co-ruled with her son, **Caesarion**, from 2 September 44 BC until her death by 12 August 30 BC. He was the last pharaoh of ancient Egypt, until his own death. His death was ordered by the future emperor Augustus, later in the month.	
Romanov	Elizabeth	1762	Male Romanovs held the title of Tsar of Russia from 1612 until 1730. The last male scion of the original line was **Peter II** (1715–1730). His aunt **Elizabeth** (1709–1762) successfully succeeded to the Russian throne when her infant great-nephew was deposed in 1741. She was the last member of the royal house. The descendants of her sister Anna Petrovna, the House of Holstein-Gottorp, then rose to the throne. They were styled the House of Holstein-Gottorp-Romanov.	
Stuart	Henry Benedict Stuart	1807	The last member of the House of Stuart was **Henry Benedict Stuart** (1725–1807), a Roman Catholic cardinal. He was the last legitimate male-line descendant of James VI and I. James became King of Scots in 1567 and King of England and Ireland in 1603. Another branch of the House of Stuart had ruled Scotland from 1371 (with the accession of Robert II) until 1567 (with the abdication of Mary, Queen of Scots). The House of Stuart was replaced temporarily from 1649 to 1660 by the Covenanters and permanently in 1714 when Queen Anne died without surviving children. Henry Cardinal Stuart's grandfather King James II & VII had been dethroned in 1688 during the Glorious Revolution. The headship of the house is usually associated today with Franz, Duke of Bavaria of the House of Wittelsbach, the senior heir-general of James II & VII's sister Henrietta Anna, Duchess of Orléans. Non-royal branches of the family still survive. The Earls of Galloway are the senior surviving line of the Stuarts, they descend from a line which originated from the second son of Alexander Stewart, 4th High Steward of Scotland.	
Tudor	Elizabeth I	1603	This dynasty ruled England since 1485. The last male member of the Tudors was **Edward VI** (1537–1553). His half-sister **Elizabeth I** (1533–1603) took the throne in 1558 and ruled until her death. She died without issue, and the House of Stuart came to the throne in the person of King James VI of Scotland.	
Vasa	Christina	1689	This dynasty ruled Poland since 1587. The last male member of the House of Vasa was **John II Casimir**. He abdicated the throne in 1668, and died without surviving children in 1672. With his death, the main Vasa line came to an end. The Vasas had previously been the ruling house of the Kingdom of Sweden since 1523, and in 1599 the Swedish throne passed to a younger branch. The last member of this line was **Christina** (1626–1689). She became queen in 1632 and ruled until her abdication in 1654. Subsequently, the House of Palatinate-Zweibrücken came to the throne in the person of King Charles X Gustav.	
