= Manuel de Lardizábal y Uribe =

The Most Excellent Manuel de Lardizábal
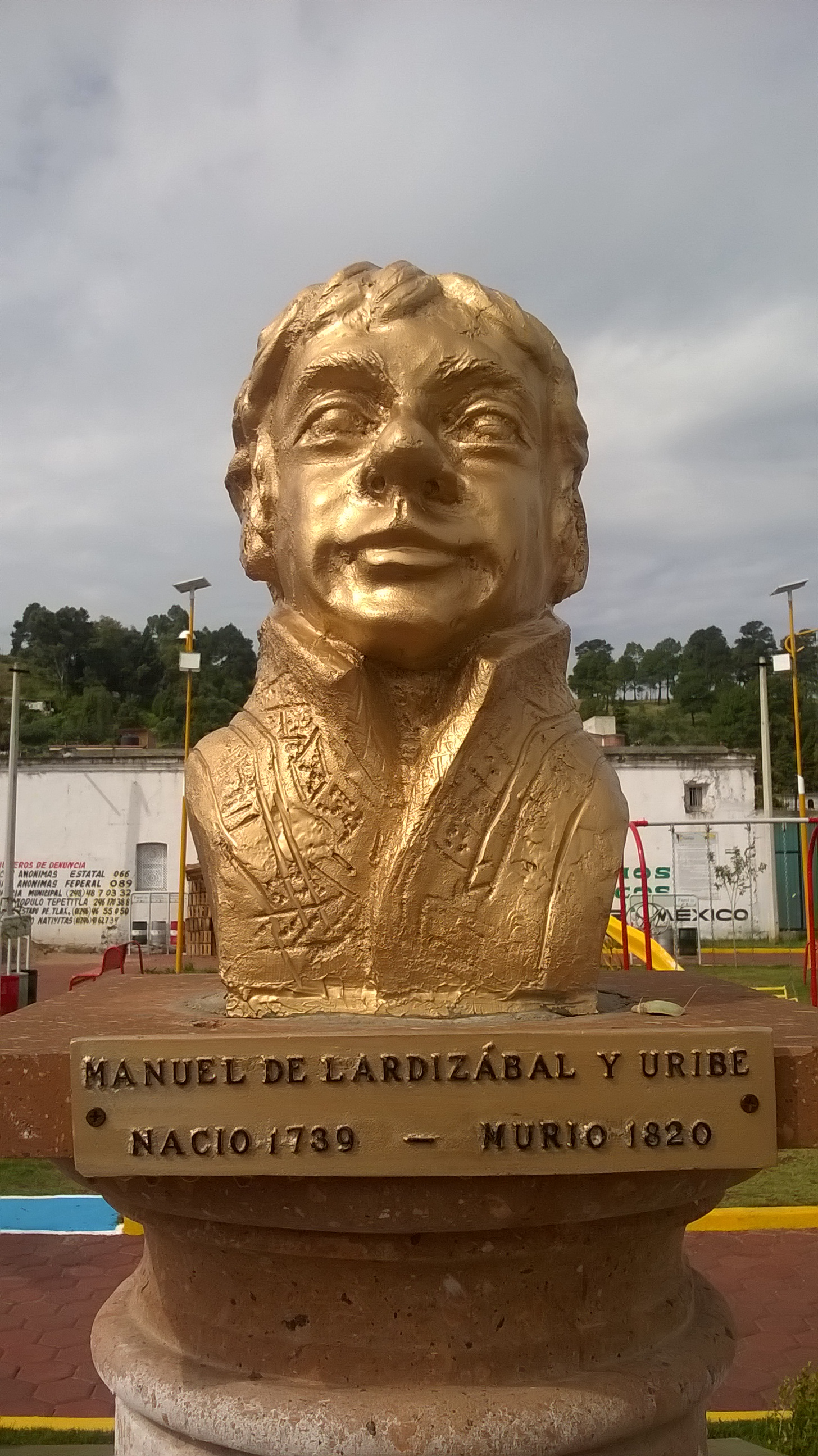
- Manuel Lardizábal y Uribe
- Born: Manuel Miguel de Lardizábal y Uribe; 23 December 1739; San Juan del Molino, Mexico
- Died: 25 December 1820 (aged 81); Madrid, Spain

Seat C of the Real Academia Española
- In office 8 August 177 – 25 December 1820
- Preceded by: Francisco Antonio de Angulo
- Succeeded by: Francisco Martínez de la Rosa

Manuel Miguel de Lardizábal y Uribe (23 December 1739 – 25 December 1820) was a Novohispanic penologist who was an academician of the Real Academia Española de la Lengua from 1775 to 1820. He seems to have been the successor to chair C of his father in law, Academician from 1746 to 1775 Francisco Antonio de Angulo.

King Charles III of Spain tried in 1764 to bring back a law of 1734 by his father King Philip V of Spain whereby even thieves operating in Madrid could be tried and executed even if no murder was involved in the thieving. The royal council pointed out to him that either victims or witnesses would default collaboration with Justice by the general popular feeling that the punishment could be disproportionate with people robbing only money, jewels, etc. while saving the lives of the persons being robbed. The King was thus obliged to keep his ideas on public order to himself and/or educated listeners.

Further, lawyer Acevedo published in 1770 a dissertation against torture, as being in conflict with Nature Rights and public decency within the Social Body. The lawyer politician from Zaragoza, Manuel de Roda y Arrieta, managed to get Charles III and his Royal Council deliberating around changes into the Penal Legislation, whereby capital punishment and/or extensive terms rotting in prisons could better be modified to convicts performing useful works needed by the public interest.

These moves, prior to 1776, where the king and his royal council echoed letters of intent dated 1776 through reflections on the significant works by Cesare Beccaria, brought about the publication in 1782 by Manuel de Lardizábal of his Discurso sobre las penas contrahido a las leyes criminales de España para facilitar su reforma. He cites Frenchman Montesquieu, Guillaume-François Le Trosne, with his Réflexions sur la réforme de la legislation universelle, the German Samuel von Pufendorf, the Dutch Hugo Grotius, the Italian Beccaria, and the reflections on the degradation applying torture of the Frenchman Joseph Michel Antoine Servan.
