= Wage–fund doctrine =

Concept from early economic theory

The wage–fund doctrine is a concept from early economic theory that seeks to show that the amount of money a worker earns in wages, paid to them from a fixed amount of funds available to employers each year (capital), is determined by the relationship of wages and capital to any changes in population. In the words of J. R. McCulloch,

wages depend at any particular moment on the magnitude of the Fund or Capital appropriated to the payment of wages compared with the number of laborers... Laborers are everywhere the divisor, capital the dividend.

The economists who first stated this relationship assumed that the amount of capital available in a given year to pay wages was an unchanging amount. So they thought that as the population changed so too would the wages of workers. If the population increased, but the amount of money available to pay as wages stayed the same, the results might be all workers would make less, or if one worker made more, another would have to make less to make up for it and workers would struggle to earn enough money to provide for basic living requirements.

Later economists determined that the relationship of capital and wages was more complex than originally thought. This is because capital in a given year is not necessarily a fixed amount, and the wage–fund doctrine was eventually abandoned in favor of later models.

== Model ==
$$Wage=\frac{Capital}{Population}$$

In essence, wage–fund doctrine states that workers' wages are determined by a ratio of capital to the population of available workers.

In this model, there is a fixed amount of capital available to pay for the costs of production and the wages necessary to sustain workers in the time between the start of production and the sale of production output. Capital may change from year to year, but only as a result of reinvesting the prior year's savings. "The wage-fund, therefore, may be greater or less at another time, but at the time taken it is definite". (Walker)

Population is the endogenous variable affecting wages. As the working population changes, the available wage moves in the opposite direction. Additionally, because capital is fixed, "the whole of [wage fund] is distributed without loss; and the average amount received by each laborer is, therefore, precisely determined by the ratio existing between the wage-fund and the number of laborers". (Walker)

If one worker earns more, another worker must earn less to compensate.

== Origins ==
The doctrine has its roots in the Physiocrats’ Tableau économique (Spiegel, pg. 389) in which the landowners provide capital to farmers in the form of land leases. The amount of land and the rents from it are fixed, and the capital needed for farming supplies and food for laborers in any one year is directly derived from the profits of the previous year’s production. Population is also the variable factor, but for the Physiocrats, it was constrained by the amount of land available for growing food, not by the amount of capital available to pay wages.

From the early 1800s until after the Napoleonic Wars were over in 1815, Great Britain had almost full employment to the point that "an increase in the number of laborers had the effect to throw some out of employment or to reduce the rate of wages for all". (Walker)

Capital was still believed to come only from savings in prior years, and no additional amount of money could be added to the production process to support more workers. Additionally, the capital used in the equation above was the macroeconomic concept of a country's total accumulated wealth, not the wealth of individuals.

At the macroeconomic level, though, enough capital had been generated in prior years that "employers found no (financial) difficulty in paying their laborers by the month, the week, or the day, instead of requiring them to await the fruition of their labor in the harvested or marketed product". (Walker)

Unlike the Physiocrats' tableau, the money to maintain the subsistence of employees during production did not have to come from previous year's savings. The wages were so low, however, that workers still lived at barely subsistence level.

== Principles of Political Economy ==
John Stuart Mill's Principles of Political Economy, published in 1848, provides the definitive treatment of Wage-Fund Doctrine. Mill's solution to increasing the wage rate above subsistence level is to control the growth of the population. If population grew faster than the growth of capital, wages would fall. If wages fell below subsistence levels, population would decrease from disease and starvation.

In 1869, Mill qualifies his support of the Wage-Fund Doctrine due to recognition that capital is not necessarily fixed in that it can be supplemented through "income of the employer which might otherwise go into savings or be spent on consumption" (Spiegel, pg. 390), but Mill eventually came to see an error in Wage-fund doctrine from his reading of William Thornton's On Labour, and declared it a "prevailing and mischievous error." Walker also states in "The Wages Question" that the limits on capital and the growth in population "were accidental, not essential" to the formation of the doctrine. The limitation on the growth of industrial capacity placed a limit on the number of workers who could be accommodated more than the limit on capital. Furthermore, English agriculture "had reached the condition of diminishing returns." (Walker); therefore, each additional worker was not providing more output than he needed for himself for survival. Given the improvements in technology and productivity that followed 1848, the original reasons that gave rise to the doctrine were seen to be unusual and not the basis for a universal law.

== Criticism ==
=== William Stanley Jevons ===
In a preface to the first edition of his 1871 publication The Theory of Political Economy, a seminal work in the Marginal Revolution in economic theory, William Stanley Jevons criticises Wage-Fund Doctrine as useless, calling it "purely delusional" and stating:

"This theory pretends to give a solution of the main problem of the science [economics]—to determine the wages of labour; yet, on close examination, its conclusion is found to be a mere truism, namely, that the average rate of wages is found by dividing the whole amount appropriated to the payment of wages by the number of those between whom it is divided."

=== Henry George ===
In Chapter III of his 1879 treatise on the causes behind poverty in progressive economies, Progress and Poverty, the self-taught economist Henry George argues against the wage-fund doctrine, writing:

"The proposition I shall endeavour to prove is: That wages, instead of being drawn from capital, are in reality drawn from the product of the labour for which they are paid... Neither the money, which is but the draft, nor the particular form of wealth that he calls for by use of the draft, represents advances of capital for his maintenance; on the contrary it represents the wealth, or a portion of the wealth, his labour has already added to the general stock."

Rather than poverty among wage-earners being caused by overpopulation, Henry George in Chapter IX instead argues that the margin of production, rather than the population of workers sharing a pool of capital, sets the rate of wages:

"The law of wages we have thus obtained is that which we previously obtained as the corollary of the law of rent.

It is, that:

Wages depend upon the margin of production, or upon the produce that labour can obtain at the highest point of natural productiveness open to it without the payment of rent."

== See also ==
- Labour economics
- Human overpopulation
