= Guillaume-François Le Trosne =

French economist (1728–1780)

- Born: October 13, 1728; Orléans, France
- Died: May 26, 1780 (aged 51); Paris
- Occupations: Economist, jurist
- Notable work: De l’ordre social

Guillaume-François Le Trosne (13 October 1728 in Orléans – 26 May 1780 in Paris), was a French jurist and economist. He is one of the main figures of physiocracy, a school of thought founded by François Quesnay and the Marquis de Mirabeau in July 1757.

== Early years ==
Born in Orleans on October 13, 1728, Le Trosne was the son of Guillaume Le Trosne, counselor and secretary to the king, magistrate judge of the area and presidential seat of Orléans, and of Thérèse Marguerite Arnault, daughter of Louis Arnault de Nobleville, bourgeois merchant of Orleans.

== Legal training ==
Le Trosne studied law in Orleans and followed his father's example by getting to dress early. In 1748 he was, in his first year of law, the pupil of the famous Robert-Joseph Pothier, of whom he would later compose, in 1773, the Éloge historique. For two years he had the privilege, together with M. de Guienne, a lawyer in Parliament and a close friend of Pothier, to review the manuscript of the latter's great work, Pandectae Justinianeae in novum ordinem digestae, published in Paris, by 1748 to 1752.

== The magistrate ==
From 1753 to 1774, Le Trosne was appointed to the office of the king's lawyer at the presidial of Orléans. He shared his experience as a magistrate in a memorable critical speech entitled l'Etat de la magistrature et des causes de sa décadence (On the State of the Magistracy and the Causes of its Decadence) (1764). When he left office after more than twenty years of career, he received the title of honorary adviser to the presidial of Orléans. During his retirement, he published his Vues sur la justice criminelle (Views on Criminal Justice) (1777). He strongly supported the model presented by Michel Servan in his famous speech of 1767 on criminal justice.

== Physiocracy ==
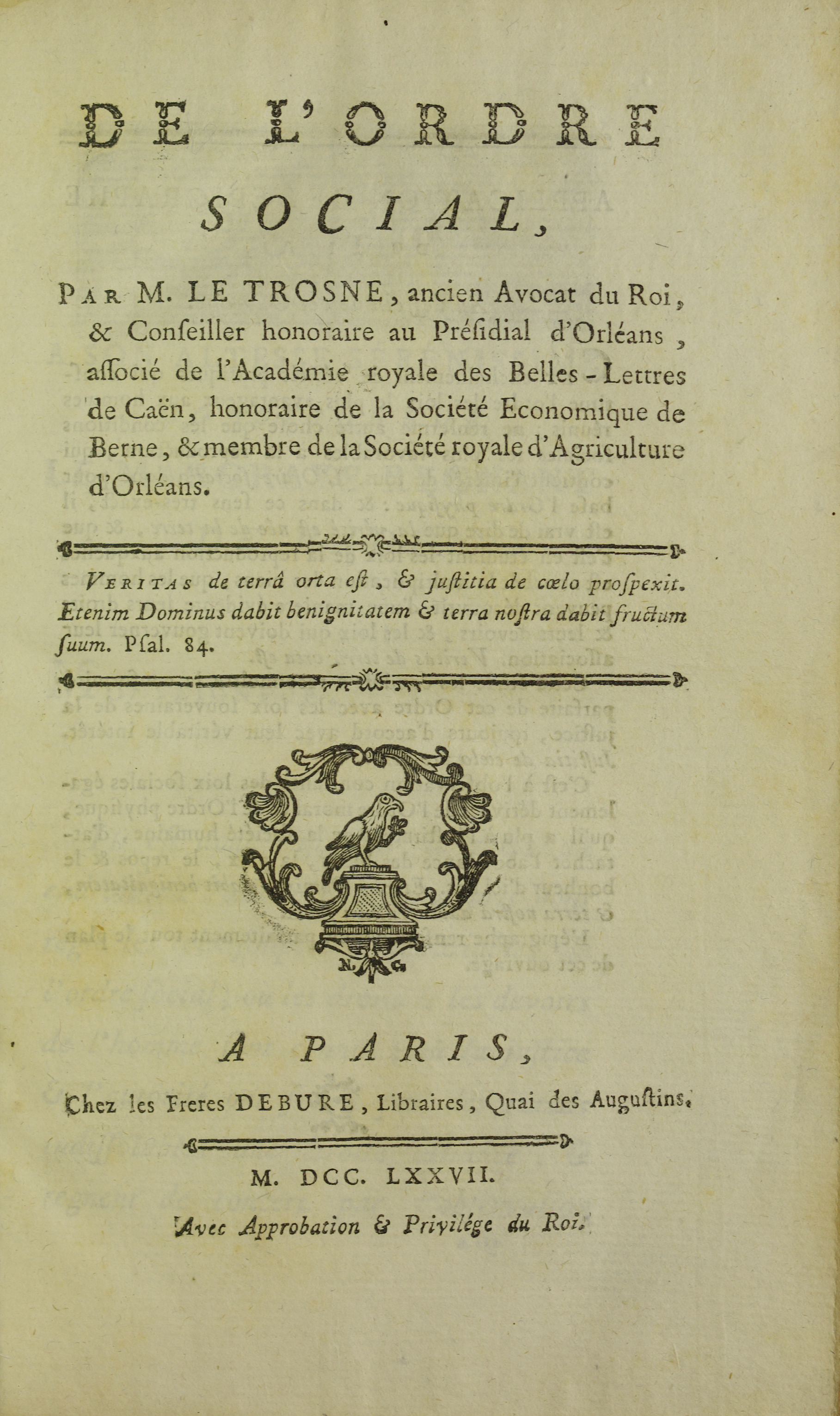
De l'ordre social, 1777

Until 1763 Le Trosne dealt with questions of natural law, the law of nations and feudal law. A founding full member of the Royal Agricultural Society of the Generality of Orléans, that same year he became a fervent disciple of the doctrine developed by Doctor François Quesnay. From 1765 to 1767, he also wrote economic articles in specialized journals, notably in the school newspaper, the Éphémérides du citoyen. From 1768, he devoted himself to more extensive work in which he developed the main precepts of the physiocratic movement.

In addition to his writing function, from 1769 he was an associate member of the Académie royale des belles-lettres de Caen, where he read, in 1770 and 1771, five speeches that he published in 1777 in one of his most important works: De l’ordre social (On the social order.) Le Trosne was, on the other hand, an honorary member of the Société économique de Berne.

His last major work, a complete and detailed account of the administrative thought of the physiocratic movement, dates from 1779: De l’administration provinciale et de la réforme de l’impôt (On provincial administration and tax reform.) Before being published, this memoir won the prize offered by the Academy of Toulouse. But, as in 1780 a meeting of the clergy was to be held in Paris, the Keeper of the Seals feared that this book would upset them, because it suggested to tax the property of the ecclesiastics. To avoid controversy and scandal, the book was seized, although Necker, however little known for his physiocratic sympathies, supported its publication.

== Death ==
Shortly after this episode, Le Trosne died in Paris on May 26, 1780, after suffering from inflammation of the chest.

== Works ==
Le Trosne authored numerous articles and books on law, economics and politics. His most well known works on politics include:

- Discours sur l'état actuel de la magistrature et sur les causes de sa décadence (1764)
- Mémoire sur les vagabonds et les mendiants (1764)
- Éloge historique de M. Pothier, conseiller au présidial d’Orléans et professeur de droit françois en l’Université de la même ville (1773)
- De l’ordre social (1777)
- De l’intérêt social (1777)
- Vues sur la justice criminelle, (1777)
- De l’administration provinciale et de la réforme de l’impôt (1779)

== Bibliography ==
- Guillaume-François Le Trosne, Les lois naturelles de l’ordre social, présentation et transcription par Thérence Carvalho, Genève, Slatkine, 2019.
- Mille, Jérôme (1905), Un physiocrate oublié: G.F. Le Trosne : étude économique fiscale et politique, L. Larose et L. Tenin, OCLC 62600615
- Mergey, Anthony (2010), L'Etat des physiocrates: autorité et décentralisation, Presses Universitaires d'Aix-Marseille (PUAM), pp. 564–565, ISBN 9782731407228
- Carvalho, Thérence (2019), "Guillaume-François Le Trosne : réformer l'administration à l'aune de la physiocratie", Les grandes figures de la décentralisation: De l'Ancien Régime à nos jours (in French), pp. 529–537, ISBN 978-2-7013-2025-0
