= Pierre Samuel du Pont de Nemours =

French-American writer, economist, and government official (1739–1817)

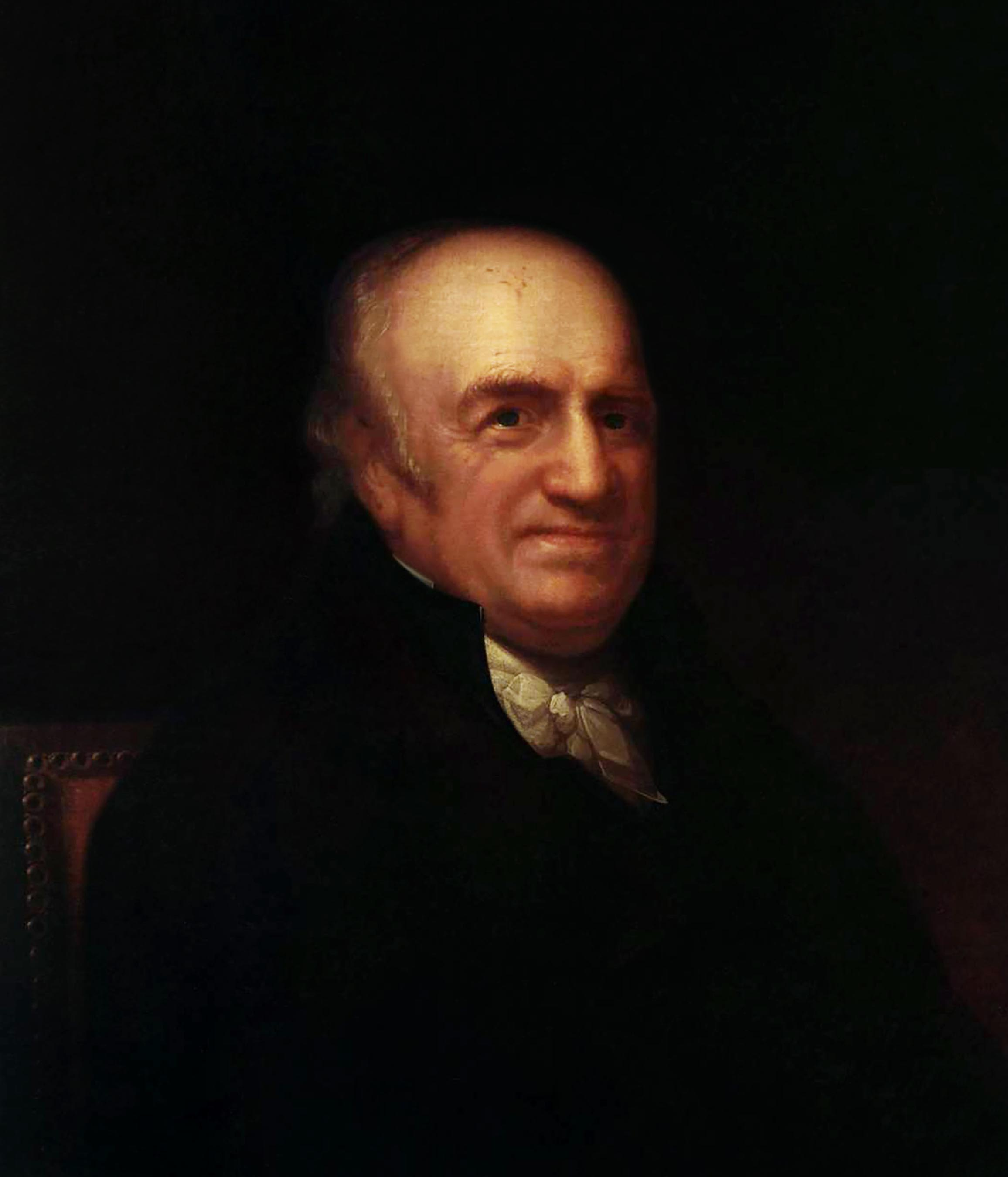

Personal details
- Born: Pierre Samuel du Pont; 14 December 1739 Paris, France
- Died: 7 August 1817 (aged 77) Greenville, Delaware, US
- Spouses: Nicole-Charlotte Marie-Louise le Dée de Rencourt (m. 1766; died 1784) Marie Françoise Robin de Poivre (m. 1795)
- Children: Victor Marie du Pont; Eleuthère Irénée du Pont

Pierre Samuel du Pont de Nemours (/djuːˈpɒnt, ˈdjuːpɒnt/ dew-PONT, DEW-pont, French: [pjɛʁ samɥɛl dy pɔ̃ d(ə) nəmuʁ]; 14 December 1739 – 7 August 1817) was a French-American writer, economist, publisher and government official. During the French Revolution, he, his two sons and their families migrated to the United States.

His son Éleuthère Irénée du Pont was the founder of E. I. du Pont de Nemours and Company. He was the patriarch and progenitor of one of the United States's most successful and wealthiest business dynasties of the 19th and 20th centuries.

== Early life and family ==
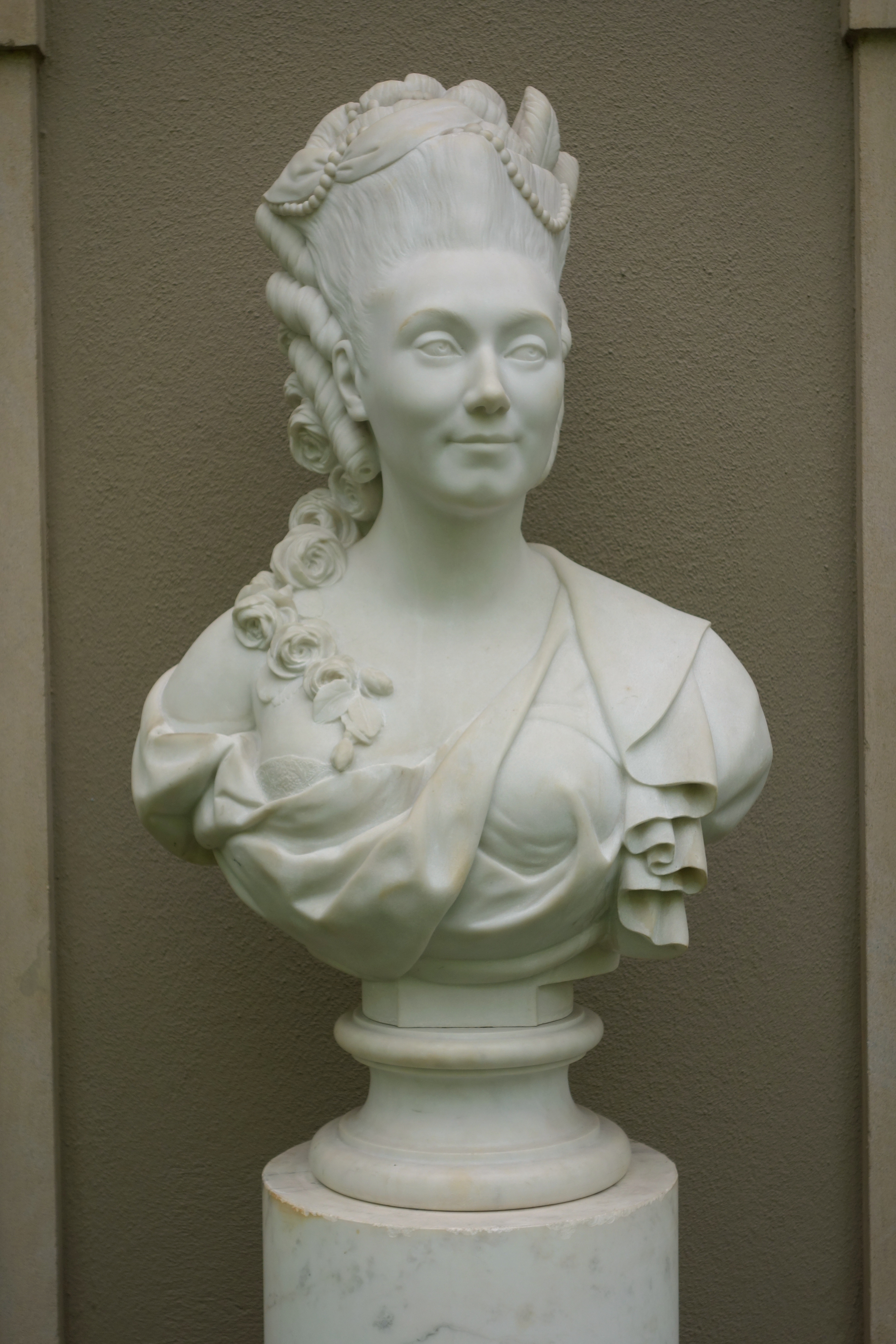
Nicole-Charlotte Marie-Louise le Dée de Rencourt

Pierre du Pont was born on 14 December 1739, the son of Samuel du Pont and Anne Alexandrine de Montchanin. His father was a watchmaker and French Protestant, or Huguenot. His mother was a descendant of an impoverished minor noble family from Burgundy.

Du Pont married Nicole-Charlotte Marie-Louise le Dée de Rencourt in 1766, also of a minor noble family. They had three sons: Victor Marie (1767–1827), a manufacturer and politician; Paul François (December 1769–January 1770); and Éleuthère Irénée (1771–1834), the founder of E.I. duPont de Nemours and Company in the United States. Nicole-Charlotte died 3 September 1784 of typhoid.

== Ancien Régime ==
With a lively intelligence and high ambition, Pierre became estranged from his father, who wanted him to be a watchmaker. The younger man developed a wide range of acquaintances with access to the French court during the Ancien Régime period. Eventually he became the protégé of Dr. François Quesnay, the personal physician of King Louis XV's mistress, Madame de Pompadour. Quesnay was the leader of a faction known as the économistes, a group of liberals at the court dedicated to economic and agricultural reforms. By the early 1760s, du Pont's writings on the national economy had drawn the attention of intellectuals such as Voltaire and Turgot. His 1768 book on physiocracy (Physiocratie, ou Constitution naturelle du gouvernement le plus avantageux au genre humain) advocated low tariffs and free trade among nations, deeply influenced Adam Smith of Scotland.

In 1768, he took over from Nicolas Baudeau, editor of Ephémérides du citoyen, ou Bibliothèque raisonnée des sciences morales et politiques; he published Observations sur l'esclavage des Negres in volume 6.

He was invited in 1774 by King Stanisław August Poniatowski (Stanislaus II Augustus) of the Polish–Lithuanian Commonwealth to help organize that country's educational system. The appointment to the Commission of National Education, with which he worked for several months, helped push his career forward, bringing him an appointment within the French government.

He served as French inspector general of commerce under Louis XVI. He helped negotiate the treaty of 1783, by which Great Britain formally recognized the independence of the United States, and arranged the terms of a commercial treaty signed by France and England in 1786.

In 1784, he was ennobled by lettres patentes from Louis XVI (a process known as noblesse de lettres), which added the de Nemours ('of Nemours') suffix to his name to reflect his residence.

== French Revolution ==
Du Pont initially supported the French Revolution and served as president of the National Constituent Assembly.

He and his son Eleuthère were among those who physically defended Louis XVI and Marie Antoinette from a mob besieging the Tuileries Palace in Paris during the insurrection of 10 August 1792. Condemned to the guillotine during the Reign of Terror, du Pont was awaiting execution when Maximilien Robespierre fell on 9 thermidor an IV (27 July 1794), and he was spared.

He married Françoise Robin on 5 vendémiaire an IV (27 September 1795). Robin was the daughter of Antoine Robin de Livet, a French aristocrat who lived in Lyon, and the widow of Pierre Poivre, the noted French administrator. After du Pont's house was sacked by a mob during the events of 18 Fructidor V (4 September 1797), he, his sons and their families immigrated to the United States in 1799.

They hoped (but failed) to found a model community of French exiles. In the United States, du Pont developed strong ties with industry and government, in particular with Thomas Jefferson, with whom he had been acquainted since at least 1787 and who had referred to him as "one of the very great men of the age" and "the ablest man in France."

Du Pont engaged in informal diplomacy between the United States and France during the reign of Napoleon. He was the originator of an idea that eventually became the Louisiana Purchase, as a way to avoid French troops landing in New Orleans, and possibly sparking armed conflict with U.S. forces. Du Pont died at Eleutherian Mills on August 7, 1817.

His son Éleuthère, who had studied chemistry in France with Antoine Lavoisier, founded a gunpowder manufacturing plant, based on his experience in France as a chemist. It became one of the largest and most successful American corporations, known today as DuPont.

In 1800, he was elected a member of the American Philosophical Society in Philadelphia, Pennsylvania.

== See also ==
- Du Pont family for other family members and relationships
- Commission of National Education
