= François Quesnay =

French physician, Physiocratic economist, and orientalist (1694–1774)

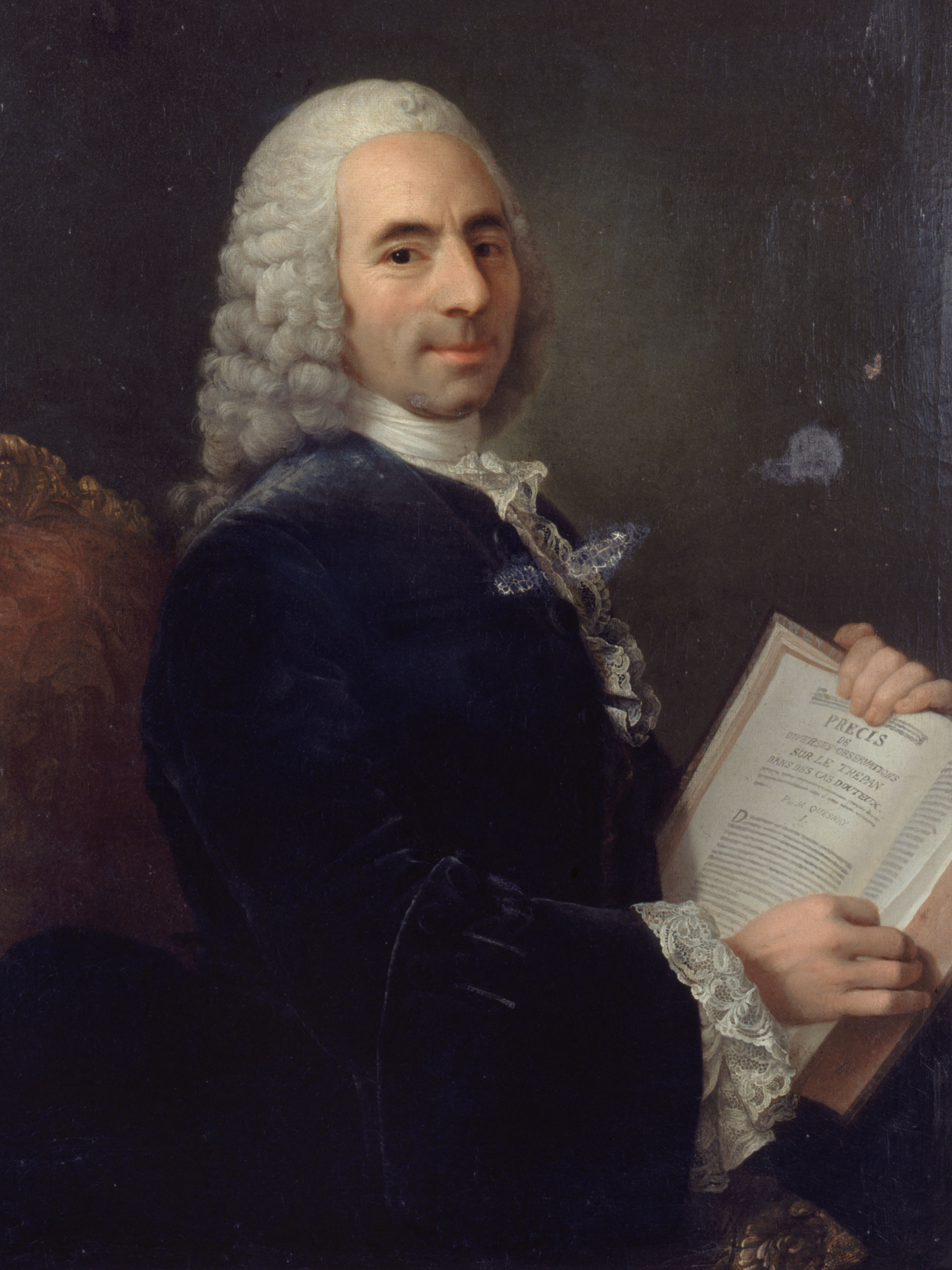
- Portrait, after 1743
- Born: 4 June 1694; Méré near Versailles, France
- Died: 16 December 1774 (aged 80); Versailles, France

Philosophical work
- Era: Age of Enlightenment
- Region: Western philosophy: French philosophy
- School: Physiocrats
- Main interests: Political economy, Sinology
- Notable ideas: Laissez-faire

François Quesnay (/keɪˈneɪ/; French: [fʁɑ̃swa kɛnɛ]; 4 June 1694 – 16 December 1774) was a French economist and physician of the Physiocratic school. He is known for publishing the "Tableau économique" (Economic Table) in 1758, which provided the foundations of the ideas of the Physiocrats. This was perhaps the first work attempting to describe the workings of the economy in an analytical way, and as such can be viewed as one of the first important contributions to economic thought. His Le Despotisme de la Chine, written in 1767, describes Chinese politics and society, and his own political support for enlightened despotism.

== Life ==
Quesnay was born at Méré near Versailles, the son of an advocate and small landed proprietor. Apprenticed at the age of sixteen to a surgeon, he soon went to Paris, studied medicine and surgery there, and, having qualified as a master-surgeon, settled down to practice at Mantes. In 1737 he was appointed perpetual secretary of the academy of surgery founded by François Gigot de la Peyronie, and became surgeon in ordinary to King Louis XV. In 1744 he graduated as a doctor of medicine; he became the physician in ordinary to the king, and afterwards his first consulting physician, and was installed in the Palace of Versailles. His apartments were on the entresol, whence the Réunions de l'entresol received their name. Louis XV esteemed Quesnay highly, and used to call him his thinker. When he ennobled him he gave him for arms three flowers of the pansy (derived from pensée, in French meaning thought), with the Latin motto Propter cogitationem mentis.

He now devoted himself principally to economic studies, taking no part in the court intrigues which were perpetually going on around him. Around 1750 he became acquainted with Jacques C.M.V. de Gournay (1712–1759), who was also an earnest inquirer in the economic field; and round these two distinguished men was gradually formed the philosophic sect of the Économistes, or, as for distinction's sake they were afterwards called, the Physiocrates. The most remarkable men in this group of disciples were the elder Mirabeau (author of L'Ami des hommes, 1756–60, and Philosophie rurale, 1763), Nicolas Baudeau (Introduction a la philosophie économique, 1771), Guillaume-François Le Trosne (De l'ordre social, 1777), André Morellet (best known by his controversy with Galiani on the freedom of the grain trade during the Flour War), Lemercier de La Rivière, and du Pont de Nemours. Adam Smith, during his stay on the continent with the young Duke of Buccleuch in 1764–1766, spent some time in Paris, where he made the acquaintance of Quesnay and some of his followers; he paid a high tribute to their scientific services in his Wealth of Nations.

In 1717, Quesnay married Jeanne-Cathérine Dauphin, and had a son and a daughter; his grandson by the former was a member of the first Legislative Assembly. He died on 16 December 1774, having lived long enough to see his great pupil, Anne Robert Jacques Turgot, Baron de Laune, in office as minister of finance.

== Work ==
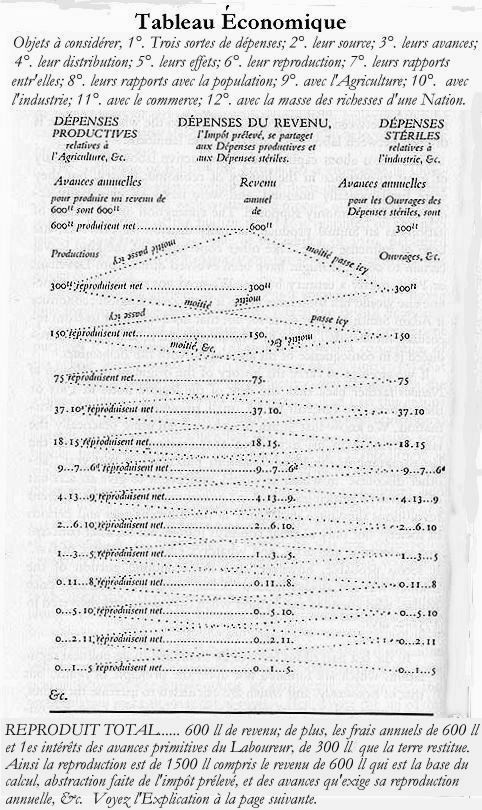
Tableau économique

His economic writings are collected in the 2nd vol. of the Principaux économistes, published by Guillaumin, Paris, with preface and notes by Eugène Daire; also his Oeuvres économiques et philosophiques were collected with an introduction and note by August Oncken (Frankfort, 1888); a facsimile reprint of the Tableau économique, from the original MS., was published by the British Economic Association (London, 1895). His other writings were the article "Évidence" in the Encyclopédie, and Recherches sur l'évidence des vérites geometriques, with a Projet de nouveaux éléments de géometrie, 1773. Quesnay's Eloge was pronounced in the Academy of Sciences by Grandjean de Fouchy (see the Recueil of that Academy, 1774, p. 134). See also F.J. Marmontel, Mémoires; Mémoires de Mme. du Hausset; H. Higgs, The Physiocrats (London, 1897).

=== Economics ===
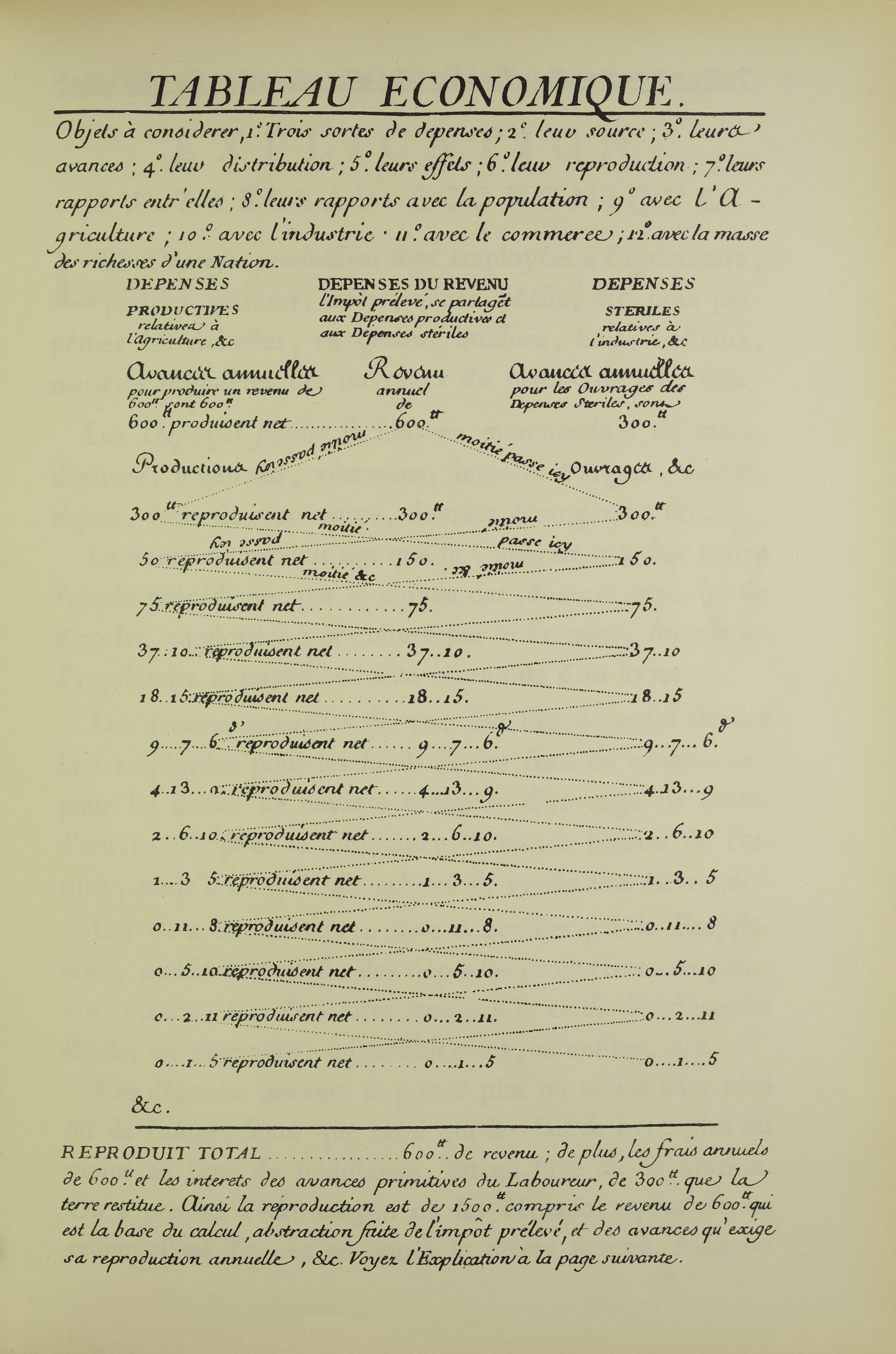
Tableau economique, 1965

In 1758 he published the Tableau économique (Economic Table), which provided the foundations of the ideas of the Physiocrats. This was perhaps the first work to attempt to describe the workings of the economy in an analytical way, and as such can be viewed as one of the first important contributions to economic thought.

The publications in which Quesnay expounded his system were the following: two articles, on "Fermiers" (Farmers) and on "Grains", in the Encyclopédie of Diderot and Jean le Rond d'Alembert (1756, 1757); a discourse on the law of nature in the Physiocratie of Dupont de Nemours (1768); Maximes générales de gouvernement economique d'un royaume agricole (1758), and the simultaneously published Tableau économique avec son explication, ou extrait des économies royales de Sully (with the celebrated motto, Pauvres paysans, pauvre royaume; pauvre royaume, pauvre roi); Dialogue sur le commerce et les travaux des artisans; and other minor pieces.

The Tableau économique, though on account of its dryness and abstract form it met with little general favor, may be considered the principal manifesto of the school. It was regarded by the followers of Quesnay as entitled to a place amongst the foremost products of human wisdom, and is named by the elder Mirabeau, in a passage quoted by Adam Smith, as one of the three great inventions which have contributed most to the stability of political societies, the other two being those of writing and of money. Its object was to exhibit by means of certain formulas the way in which the products of agriculture, which is the only source of wealth, would in a state of perfect liberty be distributed among the several classes of the community (namely, the productive classes of the proprietors and cultivators of land, and the unproductive class composed of manufacturers and merchants), and to represent by other formulas the modes of distribution which take place under systems of Governmental restraint and regulation, with the evil results arising to the whole society from different degrees of such violations of the natural order. It follows from Quesnay's theoretic views that the one thing deserving the solicitude of the practical economist and the statesman is the increase of the net product; and he infers also what Smith afterwards affirmed, on not quite the same ground, that the interest of the landowner is strictly and indissolubly connected with the general interest of the society. A small edition de luxe of this work, with other pieces, was printed in 1758 in the Palace of Versailles under the king's immediate supervision, some of the sheets, it is said, having been pulled by the royal hand. Already in 1767 the book had disappeared from circulation, and no copy of it is now procurable; but, the substance of it has been preserved in the Ami des hommes of Mirabeau, and the Physiocratie of Dupont de Nemours.

=== Orientalism and China ===
Quesnay is known for his writings on Chinese politics and society. His book Le Despotisme de la Chine, written in 1767, describes his views of the Chinese imperial system. He was supportive of the meritocratic concept of giving scholars political power, without the cumbersome aristocracy that characterized French politics, and the importance of agriculture to the welfare of a nation. Gregory Blue writes that Quesnay "praised China as a constitutional despotism and openly advocated the adoption of Chinese institutions, including a standardized system of taxation and universal education." Blue speculates that this may have influenced the 1793 establishment of the Permanent Settlement in Bengal by the British Empire. Quesnay's interests in Orientalism has also been a source of criticism. Carol Blum, in her book Strength in Numbers on 18th century France, labels Quesnay an "apologist for Oriental despotism."

Because of his admiration of Confucianism, Quesnay's followers bestowed him with the title "Confucius of Europe." Quesnay's infatuation for Chinese culture, as described by Jesuits, led him to persuade the son of Louis XV to mirror the "plowing of sacred land" by the Chinese emperor to symbolize the link between government and agriculture.

=== On taxation ===
Quesnay acknowledged three economic classes in France: the "proprietary" class consisting of only landowners, the "productive" class of agricultural workers, and the "sterile" class of merchants. Quesnay saw no benefit to the sterile class and believed the productive to be all important. Quesnay viewed France's agriculture as backward and unproductive compared to Britain during the time he was residing in the Palace of Versailles. Despite residing in the Palace, Quesnay believed agriculture was the heart of the economy and of special importance to him. Quesnay argued that taxes placed on cultivators are only harmful to society as these taxes will reduce the incentive for agricultural production. Taxing proprietors (property holders) does not destroy the means of production meaning there is no decline in output. Quesnay wanted proprietors to bear the full burden of the tax in the country as taxing cultivators is a negative consequence for everyone. Removing incentive from cultivators reduces agricultural production and the agricultural surplus Quesnay believed to be the heart of the economy. Quesnay also opposed indirect taxes in contrast to direct taxes. These "indirect taxes" are placed on the French public by proprietors whose greed demands immunity from taxation. Direct taxes on proprietors have no impact on reproduction and economic decline. Reducing indirect taxes and increasing direct taxes gives the French a surplus of agriculture and the funding the country needs. However, this opinion was not very popular among the wealthy of which Quesnay spent time regularly with. He spent some of his time fearing for his life in the Palace.

Quesnay’s taxation theory was closely linked to his broader model of economic circulation, particularly as expressed in the Tableau Économique. Tax policy was not treated as an isolated fiscal question but as a mechanism that could either preserve or disrupt the circulation of the agricultural surplus among classes. From this perspective, taxation that reduced the surplus available to agriculture risked breaking the process of reproduction that sustained the economy over time. Also note that Quesnay regarded fiscal reform as inseparable from legal and institutional reform, since privileges, exemptions, and fragmented tax administration prevented the rational allocation of the surplus. As a result, Quesnay’s proposals implied a significant restructuring of state finance rather than a marginal adjustment of existing taxes, which limited their political feasibility under the Ancient Régime. Historians interpret these limits as evidence of tension between Physiocratic theory and entrenched social hierarchies in eighteenth-century France.

== See also ==
- Contributions to liberal theory
- History of economic thought
- Liberalism
- Ronald L. Meek
- Circular flow of income
