= Laissez-faire =

Economic system free from interventionism

Laissez-faire (/ˌlɛseɪˈfɛər/ LESS-ay-FAIR, from French: laissez faire [lɛse fɛːʁ], lit. 'let do') implies that nothing restricts what happens, irrespective of the potential consequences. In the financial area, it is a type of economic system in which transactions between private individuals are free from any form of economic interventionism (such as subsidies or regulations).

Applied to a system of thought, laissez-faire implies the following axioms: "the individual is the basic unit in society, i.e., the standard of measurement in social calculus; the individual has a natural right to freedom; and the physical order of nature is a harmonious and self-regulating system." The original phrase was laissez faire, laissez passer, with the second part meaning "let (things) pass". It is generally attributed to Vincent de Gournay. In its application to markets, the principle of laissez-faire holds that markets should naturally be competitive, a rule that the early advocates of laissez-faire always emphasized.

The Physiocrats were early advocates of laissez-faire and advocated for an impôt unique, a tax on land rent to replace the "monstrous and crippling network of taxation that had grown up in 17th century France". Their view was that only land should be taxed because land is not produced but is a naturally existing resource, meaning a tax on it would not take from the labour of the taxed, unlike most other taxes.

Proponents of laissez-faire argue for a near complete separation of government from the economic sector. The phrase laissez-faire is part of a larger French phrase and literally translates to "let [it/them] do", but in this context the phrase usually means "let it be" and, as an expression, "laid back". Although never practiced with full consistency, laissez-faire capitalism emerged in the mid-18th century and was further popularized by Adam Smith's book The Wealth of Nations.

== Etymology and usage ==
The term laissez-faire likely originated in a meeting that took place around 1681 between powerful French Controller-General of Finances Jean-Baptiste Colbert and a group of French businessmen headed by M. Le Gendre. When the eager mercantilist minister asked how the French state could be of service to the merchants and help promote their commerce, Le Gendre replied simply: "Laissez-nous faire" ("Leave it to us" or "Let us do [it]", the French verb not requiring an object).

The anecdote on the Colbert–Le Gendre meeting appeared in a 1751 article in the Journal économique, written by French minister and champion of free trade René de Voyer, Marquis d'Argenson—also the first known appearance of the term in print. Argenson himself had used the phrase earlier (1736) in his own diaries in a famous outburst:

Laissez faire, telle devrait être la devise de toute puissance publique, depuis que le monde est civilisé [...]. Détestable principe que celui de ne vouloir grandir que par l'abaissement de nos voisins ! Il n'y a que la méchanceté et la malignité du cœur de satisfaites dans ce principe, et l'intérêt y est opposé. Laissez faire, morbleu ! Laissez faire !!

Let go, which should be the motto of all public power, since the world was civilized [...]. [It is] a detestable principle of those that want to enlarge [themselves] but by the abasement of our neighbours. There is but the wicked and the malignant heart[s] [who are] satisfied by this principle and [its] interest is opposed. Let go, for God's sake! Let go!!

— René Louis de Voyer de Paulmy d'Argenson

Vincent de Gournay, a French Physiocrat and intendant of commerce in the 1750s, popularized the term laissez-faire as he allegedly adopted it from François Quesnay's writings on China. Quesnay coined the phrases laissez-faire and laissez-passer, laissez-faire being a translation of the Chinese term wu wei (無為). However, this translation could be a deviation from its meaning in the original context of Classical Chinese philosophy. Gournay ardently supported the removal of restrictions on trade and the deregulation of industry in France. Delighted with the Colbert–Le Gendre anecdote, he forged it into a larger maxim all his own: "Laissez faire et laissez passer" ("Let do and let pass"). His motto has also been identified as the longer "Laissez faire et laissez passer, le monde va de lui même !" ("Let do and let pass, the world goes on by itself!"). Although Gournay left no written tracts on his economic policy ideas, he had immense personal influence on his contemporaries, notably his fellow Physiocrats, who credit both the laissez-faire slogan and the doctrine to Gournay.

Before d'Argenson or Gournay, P. S. de Boisguilbert had enunciated the phrase "On laisse faire la nature" ("Let nature run its course"). D'Argenson himself during his life was better known for the similar, but less-celebrated motto "Pas trop gouverner" ("Govern not too much").

The Physiocrats proclaimed laissez-faire in 18th-century France, placing it at the very core of their economic principles and famous economists, beginning with Adam Smith, developed the idea. It is with the Physiocrats and the classical political economy that the term laissez-faire is ordinarily associated. The book Laissez Faire and the General-Welfare State states: "The physiocrats, reacting against the excessive mercantilist regulations of the France of their day, expressed a belief in a 'natural order' or liberty under which individuals in following their selfish interests contributed to the general good. Since, in their view, this natural order functioned successfully without the aid of government, they advised the state to restrict itself to upholding the rights of private property and individual liberty, to removing all artificial barriers to trade, and to abolishing all useless laws."

The French phrase laissez-faire gained currency in English-speaking countries with the spread of Physiocratic literature in the late 18th century. George Whatley's 1774 Principles of Trade (co-authored with Benjamin Franklin) re-told the Colbert-LeGendre anecdote; this may mark the first appearance of the phrase in an English-language publication.

Herbert Spencer was opposed to a slightly different application of laissez faire—to "that miserable laissez-faire" that leads to men's ruin, saying: "Along with that miserable laissez-faire which calmly looks on while men ruin themselves in trying to enforce by law their equitable claims, there goes activity in supplying them, at other men's cost, with gratis novel-reading!"

As a product of the Enlightenment, laissez-faire was "conceived as the way to unleash human potential through the restoration of a natural system, a system unhindered by the restrictions of government". In a similar vein, Adam Smith viewed the economy as a natural system and the market as an organic part of that system. Smith saw laissez-faire as a moral program and the market its instrument to ensure men the rights of natural law. By extension, free markets become a reflection of the natural system of liberty. For Smith, laissez-faire was "a program for the abolition of laws constraining the market, a program for the restoration of order and for the activation of potential growth".

However, Smith and notable classical economists such as Thomas Malthus and David Ricardo did not use the phrase. Jeremy Bentham used the term, but it was probably James Mill's reference to the laissez-faire maxim (together with the "Pas trop gouverner" motto) in an 1824 entry for the Encyclopædia Britannica that really brought the term into wider English usage. With the advent of the Anti-Corn Law League (founded 1838), the term received much of its English meaning.

Smith first used the metaphor of an invisible hand in his book The Theory of Moral Sentiments (1759) to describe the unintentional effects of economic self-organization from economic self-interest. Although not the metaphor itself, the idea lying behind the invisible hand belongs to Bernard de Mandeville and his Fable of the Bees (1705). In political economy, that idea and the doctrine of laissez-faire have long been closely related. Some have characterized the invisible-hand metaphor as one for laissez-faire, although Smith never used the term.

American individualist anarchists such as Benjamin Tucker saw themselves as economic laissez-faire socialists and political individualists while arguing that their "anarchistic socialism" or "individual anarchism" was "consistent Manchesterism".

In Third Millennium Capitalism (2000), Wyatt M. Rogers Jr. notes a trend whereby recently "conservative politicians and economists have chosen the term 'free-market capitalism' in lieu of laissez-faire".

== History ==
=== Rome ===
Roman law developed during the 1st to 3rd centuries AD, and was divided between public and private law. Public law dealt with the administration of government, whereas private law regulated interactions between individuals. According to Rothbard, Roman "Private law developed the theory of the absolute right of private property and of freedom of trade and contract. While Roman public law theoretically allowed state interference in the life of the citizen, there was little such interference in the late Republic and early Empire. Private property rights and laissez-faire were therefore the fundamental heritage of the Roman law to later centuries, and much of it was adopted by countries of the Christian West."

=== Europe ===
In Europe, the laissez-faire movement was first widely promoted by the Physiocrats, a movement that included Vincent de Gournay (1712–1759), a successful merchant who became a political figure. Gournay is postulated to have adapted the Taoist concept wu wei, from the writings on China by François Quesnay (1694–1774). Gournay held that government should allow the laws of nature to govern economic activity, with the state only intervening to protect life, liberty and property. François Quesnay and Anne Robert Jacques Turgot, Baron de l'Aulne took up Gournay's ideas. Quesnay had the ear of Louis XV, King of France, and in 1754 persuaded him to give laissez-faire a try. On September 17, the King abolished all tolls and restraints on the sale and transport of grain. For more than a decade, the experiment appeared successful, but 1768 saw a poor harvest, and the cost of bread rose so high that there was widespread starvation while merchants exported grain to obtain the best profit. In 1770, the Comptroller-General of Finances Joseph Marie Terray revoked the edict allowing free trade in grain.

The doctrine of laissez-faire became an integral part of 19th-century European liberalism. Just as liberals supported freedom of thought in the intellectual sphere, so were they equally prepared to champion the principles of free trade and free competition in the sphere of economics, seeing the state as merely a passive policeman, protecting private property and administering justice, but not interfering with the affairs of its citizens. Businessmen, British industrialists in particular, were quick to associate these principles with their own economic interests. Many of the ideas of the physiocrats spread throughout Europe and were adopted to a greater or lesser extent in Sweden, Tuscany, Spain and in the newly created United States. Adam Smith, author of The Wealth of Nations (1776), met Quesnay and acknowledged his influence.

In Britain, the newspaper The Economist (founded in 1843) became an influential voice for laissez-faire capitalism. Some laissez-faire-oriented thinkers opposed extensive government relief for famines within the British Empire. In 1847, referring to the famine then underway in Ireland, founder of The Economist James Wilson wrote: "It is no man's business to provide for another". More specifically, in An Essay on the Principle of Population, Malthus argued that there was nothing that could be done to avoid famines because he felt he had mathematically proven that population growth tends to exceed growth in food production. However, The Economist campaigned against the Corn Laws that protected landlords in the United Kingdom of Great Britain and Ireland against competition from less expensive foreign imports of cereal products. The Great Famine in Ireland in 1845 led to the repeal of the Corn Laws in 1846. The tariffs on grain which kept the price of bread artificially high were repealed. However, repeal of the Corn Laws came too late to stop the Irish famine, partly because it was done in stages over three years.

A group that became known as the Manchester Liberals, to which Richard Cobden (1804–1865) and John Bright (1811–1889) belonged, were staunch defenders of free trade. After the death of Cobden, the Cobden Club (founded in 1866) continued their work. The breakdown of laissez-faire as practised by the British Empire was partly led by British companies eager for state support of their positions abroad, in particular British oil companies.

In Italy, philosopher Benedetto Croce created the term "liberism" (derived from the Italian term liberismo), a term for the economic doctrine of laissez-faire capitalism; it is synonymous with economic liberalism. He claimed that "Liberalism can prove only a temporary right of private propriety of land and industries." It was popularized in English by Italian political scientist Giovanni Sartori. Sartori specifically imported the term from Italian to distinguish between social liberalism, which is generally considered a political ideology often advocating extensive government intervention in the economy, and those economic liberal theories that propose to virtually eliminate such intervention. In informal usage, liberism overlaps with other concepts such as free trade, right-libertarianism, the American concept of libertarianism, and the laissez-faire doctrine of the French liberal Doctrinaires. The intention of Croce and of Sartori to attack the right to private property and to free enterprise separating them from the general philosophy of liberalism, that is primarily a theory of natural rights, was always criticised openly by the quoted philosophers and by some of the main representatives of liberalism, such as Luigi Einaudi, Friedrich Hayek, and Milton Friedman. The Austrian School economist Eugen von Böhm-Bawerk argued that the differences between the economic concept of liberism and the economic consequences of liberalism can be summarized by saying that "A market is a law system. Without it, the only possible economy is the street robbery."

=== United States ===
Frank Bourgin's study of the Constitutional Convention and subsequent decades argues that direct government involvement in the economy was intended by the Founding Fathers. The reason for this was the economic and financial chaos the nation suffered under the Articles of Confederation. The goal was to ensure that dearly won political independence was not lost by becoming economically and financially dependent on the powers and princes of Europe. The creation of a strong central government able to promote science, invention, industry and commerce was seen as an essential means of promoting the general welfare and making the economy of the United States strong enough for them to determine their own destiny. Others view Bourgin's study, written in the 1940s and not published until 1989, as an over-interpretation of the evidence, intended originally to defend the New Deal and later to counter Ronald Reagan's economic policies.

Historian Kathleen G. Donohue argues that in the 19th century liberalism in the United States had distinctive characteristics and that "at the center of classical liberal theory [in Europe] was the idea of laissez-faire. To the vast majority of American classical liberals, however, laissez-faire did not mean "no government intervention" at all. On the contrary, they were more than willing to see government provide tariffs, railroad subsidies, and internal improvements, all of which benefited producers". Notable examples of government intervention in the period prior to the American Civil War include the establishment of the Patent Office in 1802; the establishment of the Office of Standard Weights and Measures in 1830; the creation of the Survey of the Coast (later renamed the United States Coast Survey and then the United States Coast and Geodetic Survey) in 1807 and other measures to improve river and harbor navigation; the various Army expeditions to the west, beginning with Lewis and Clark's Corps of Discovery in 1804 and continuing into the 1870s, almost always under the direction of an officer from the Army Corps of Topographical Engineers and which provided crucial information for the overland pioneers that followed; the assignment of Army Engineer officers to assist or direct the surveying and construction of the early railroads and canals; and the establishment of the First Bank of the United States and Second Bank of the United States as well as various protectionist measures (e.g. the tariff of 1828). Several of these proposals met with serious opposition and required a great deal of horse-trading to be enacted into law. For instance, the First National Bank would not have reached the desk of President George Washington in the absence of an agreement that was reached between Alexander Hamilton and several Southern members of Congress to locate the capitol in the District of Columbia. In contrast to Hamilton and the Federalists was Thomas Jefferson and James Madison's opposing political party, the Democratic-Republicans.

Most of the early opponents of laissez-faire capitalism in the United States subscribed to the American School. This school of thought was inspired by the ideas of Hamilton, who proposed the creation of a government-sponsored bank and increased tariffs to favor Northern industrial interests. Following Hamilton's death, the more abiding protectionist influence in the antebellum period came from Henry Clay and his American System. In the early 19th century, "it is quite clear that the laissez-faire label is an inappropriate one" to apply to the relationship between the United States government and industry. In the mid-19th century, the United States followed the Whig tradition of economic nationalism, which included increased state regulation and macroeconomic development through infrastructure. Public works such as the provision and regulation transportation such as railroads took effect. The Pacific Railway Acts provided the development of the First transcontinental railroad. To help pay for its war effort in the Civil War, the United States government imposed its first personal income tax on 5 August 1861 as part of the Revenue Act of 1861 (3% of all incomes over US$800; rescinded in 1872).

Following the Civil War, the movement towards a mixed economy accelerated. Protectionism increased with the McKinley Tariff of 1890 and the Dingley Tariff of 1897. Government regulation of the economy expanded with the enactment of the Interstate Commerce Act of 1887 and the Sherman Antitrust Act. The Progressive Era saw the enactment of more controls on the economy as evidenced by the Woodrow Wilson administration's New Freedom program. Following World War I and the Great Depression, the United States turned to a mixed economy which combined free enterprise with a progressive income tax and in which from time to time the government stepped in to support and protect American industry from competition from overseas. For example, in the 1980s the government sought to protect the automobile industry by "voluntary" export restrictions from Japan.

In 1986, Pietro S. Nivola wrote: "By and large, the comparative strength of the dollar against major foreign currencies has reflected high U.S. interest rates driven by huge federal budget deficits. Hence, the source of much of the current deterioration of trade is not the general state of the economy, but rather the government's mix of fiscal and monetary policies – that is, the problematic juxtaposition of bold tax reductions, relatively tight monetary targets, generous military outlays, and only modest cuts in major entitlement programs. Put simply, the roots of the trade problem and of the resurgent protectionism it has fomented are fundamentally political as well as economic".

A more recent advocate of total laissez-faire has been Objectivist Ayn Rand, who described it as "the abolition of any and all forms of government intervention in production and trade, the separation of State and Economics, in the same way and for the same reasons as the separation of Church and State". Rand's political philosophy emphasized individual rights (including property rights) and she considered laissez-faire capitalism the only moral social system because in her view it was the only system based on the protection of those rights. She opposed statism, which she understood to include theocracy, absolute monarchy, Nazism, fascism, communism, socialism and dictatorship. Rand believed that natural rights should be enforced by a constitutionally limited government. Although her political views are often classified as conservative or libertarian, she preferred the term "radical for capitalism". She worked with conservatives on political projects, but disagreed with them over issues such as religion and ethics. She denounced libertarianism, which she associated with anarchism. She rejected anarchism as a naïve theory based in subjectivism that could only lead to collectivism in practice.

== Models ==
=== Capitalism ===
Laissez-faire capitalism has been presented as raw, pure, or unrestrained capitalism, capitalism free of any regulations, with low or minimal or no government and operating entirely on the profit motive. It shares a similar economic conception with anarcho-capitalism.

Advocates of laissez-faire capitalism argue that it relies on a constitutionally limited government that unconditionally bans the initiation of force and coercion, including fraud. Therefore, free market economists such as Milton Friedman and Thomas Sowell argue that, under such a system, relationships between companies and workers are purely voluntary and mistreated workers will seek better treatment elsewhere. Thus, most companies will compete for workers on the basis of pay, benefits, and work-life balance just as they compete with one another in the marketplace on the basis of the relative cost and quality of their goods.

So-called "raw" or "hyper-capitalism" is a major motif of cyberpunk in dystopian works such as Syndicate.

=== Socialism ===
Although laissez-faire has been commonly associated with capitalism, there is a similar laissez-faire economic theory and system associated with socialism called left-wing laissez-faire, or free-market anarchism, also known as free-market anti-capitalism and free-market socialism to distinguish it from laissez-faire capitalism. One first example of this is mutualism as developed by Pierre-Joseph Proudhon in the 19th century, from which emerged individualist anarchism. Benjamin Tucker is one eminent American individualist anarchist who adopted a laissez-faire system he termed anarchistic socialism in contraposition to state socialism. This tradition has been recently associated with contemporary scholars such as Kevin Carson, Roderick T. Long, Charles W. Johnson, Brad Spangler, Sheldon Richman, Chris Matthew Sciabarra and Gary Chartier, who stress the value of radically free markets, termed freed markets to distinguish them from the common conception which these left-libertarians believe to be riddled with capitalist and statist privileges. Referred to as left-wing market anarchists or market-oriented left-libertarians, proponents of this approach strongly affirm the classical liberal ideas of self-ownership and free markets while maintaining that taken to their logical conclusions these ideas support anti-capitalist, anti-corporatist, anti-hierarchical and pro-labor positions in economics; anti-imperialism in foreign policy; and thoroughly radical views regarding such cultural issues as gender, sexuality and race. Critics of laissez-faire as commonly understood argues that a truly laissez-faire system would be anti-capitalist and socialist.

Kevin Carson describes his politics as on "the outer fringes of both free market libertarianism and socialism" and has also been highly critical of intellectual property. Carson has identified the work of Benjamin Tucker, Thomas Hodgskin, Ralph Borsodi, Paul Goodman, Lewis Mumford, Elinor Ostrom, Peter Kropotkin and Ivan Illich as sources of inspiration for his approach to politics and economics. In addition to individualist anarchist Benjamin Tucker's big four monopolies (land, money, tariffs and patents), he argues that the state has also transferred wealth to the wealthy by subsidizing organizational centralization in the form of transportation and communication subsidies. Carson believes that Tucker overlooked this issue due to Tucker's focus on individual market transactions whereas he also focuses on organizational issues. As such, the primary focus of his most recent work has been decentralized manufacturing and the informal and household economies. The theoretical sections of Carson's Studies in Mutualist Political Economy are also presented as an attempt to integrate marginalist critiques into the labor theory of value.

In response to claims that he uses the term capitalism incorrectly, Carson says he is deliberately choosing to resurrect what he claims to be an old definition of the term to "make a point". He claims that "the term 'capitalism,' as it was originally used, did not refer to a free market, but to a type of statist class system in which capitalists controlled the state and the state intervened in the market on their behalf". Carson holds that "capitalism, arising as a new class society directly from the old class society of the Middle Ages, was founded on an act of robbery as massive as the earlier feudal conquest of the land. It has been sustained to the present by continual state intervention to protect its system of privilege without which its survival is unimaginable". Carson argues that in a truly laissez-faire system the ability to extract a profit from labor and capital would be negligible. Carson coined the pejorative term vulgar libertarianism, a phrase that describes the use of a free market rhetoric in defense of corporate capitalism and economic inequality. According to Carson, the term is derived from the phrase vulgar political economy which Karl Marx described as an economic order that "deliberately becomes increasingly apologetic and makes strenuous attempts to talk out of existence the ideas which contain the contradictions [existing in economic life]".

Gary Chartier offers an understanding of property rights as contingent yet tightly constrained social strategies, reflective of the importance of multiple, overlapping rationales for separate ownership and of natural law principles of practical reasonableness, defending robust yet non-absolute protections for these rights in a manner similar to that employed by David Hume. This account is distinguished both from Lockean and neo-Lockean views which deduce property rights from the idea of self-ownership and from consequentialist accounts that might license widespread ad hoc interference with the possessions of groups and individuals. Chartier uses this account to ground a clear statement of the natural law basis for the view that solidaristic wealth redistribution by individual persons is often morally required, but as a response by individuals and grass-roots networks to particular circumstances rather than as a state-driven attempt to achieve a particular distributive pattern. He advances detailed arguments for workplace democracy rooted in such natural law principles as subsidiarity, defending it as morally desirable and as a likely outcome of the elimination of injustice rather than as something to be mandated by the state.

Chartier has discussed natural law approaches to land reform and to the occupation of factories by workers. He objects on natural law grounds to intellectual property protections, drawing on his theory of property rights more generally and develops a general natural law account of boycotts. He has argued that proponents of genuinely freed markets should explicitly reject capitalism and identify with the global anti-capitalist movement while emphasizing that the abuses the anti-capitalist movement highlights result from state-tolerated violence and state-secured privilege rather than from voluntary cooperation and exchange. According to Chartier, "it makes sense for [freed-market advocates] to name what they oppose 'capitalism.' Doing so calls attention to the freedom movement's radical roots, emphasizes the value of understanding society as an alternative to the state, underscores the fact that proponents of freedom object to non-aggressive as well as aggressive restraints on liberty, ensures that advocates of freedom aren't confused with people who use market rhetoric to prop up an unjust status quo, and expresses solidarity between defenders of freed markets and workers — as well as ordinary people around the world who use "capitalism" as a short-hand label for the world-system that constrains their freedom and stunts their lives".

== Criticism ==
Over the years, a number of economists have offered critiques of laissez-faire economics. Adam Smith acknowledges some moral ambiguities towards the system of capitalism. Smith had misgivings concerning some aspects of each of the major character-types produced by modern capitalist society, namely the landlords, the workers and the capitalists. Smith claimed that "[t]he landlords' role in the economic process is passive. Their ability to reap a revenue solely from ownership of land tends to make them indolent and inept, and so they tend to be unable to even look after their own economic interests" and that "[t]he increase in population should increase the demand for food, which should increase rents, which should be economically beneficial to the landlords". According to Smith, the landlords should be in favour of policies which contribute to the growth in the wealth of nations, but they often are not in favour of these pro-growth policies because of their own indolence-induced ignorance and intellectual flabbiness. Smith stated clearly that he believed that without morality and laws, society would fail. From that perspective, it seems dubious that Smith supported a pure Laissez-Faire style of capitalism, and the ideas he supports in The Wealth of Nations is heavily dependent on the moral philosophy from his previous work, Theory of Moral Sentiment.

Many philosophers have written on the systems society has created to manage their civilizations. Thomas Hobbes used the concept of a "state of nature", which is a time before any government or laws, as a starting point to consider the question. In this time, life would be "war of all against all". Further, "In such condition, there is no place for industry; because the fruit thereof is uncertain ... continual fear and danger of violent death, and the life of man solitary, poor, nasty, brutish, and short."

Regardless of preferred political preference, all societies require shared moral values as a prerequisite on which to build laws to protect individuals from each other. Adam Smith wrote Wealth of Nations during the Enlightenment, a period of time when the prevailing attitude was, "All things can be Known." In effect, European thinkers, inspired by the likes of Isaac Newton and others, set about to "find the laws" of all things, that there existed a "natural law" underlying all aspects of life. They believed that these could be discovered and that everything in the universe could be rationally demystified and catalogued, including human interactions.

Critics and market abolitionists such as David McNally argue in the Marxist tradition that the logic of the market inherently produces inequitable outcomes and leads to unequal exchanges, arguing that Smith's moral intent and moral philosophy espousing equal exchange was undermined by the practice of the free market he championed. According to McNally, the development of the market economy involved coercion, exploitation and violence that Smith's moral philosophy could not countenance.

The British economist John Maynard Keynes condemned laissez-faire economic policy on several occasions. In The End of Laissez-faire (1926), one of the most famous of his critiques, Keynes argues that the doctrines of laissez-faire are dependent to some extent on improper deductive reasoning and says the question of whether a market solution or state intervention is better must be determined on a case-by-case basis.

The Austrian School economist Friedrich Hayek stated that a freely competitive, laissez-faire banking industry tends to be endogenously destabilizing and pro-cyclical, arguing that the need for central banking control was inescapable.

Karl Polanyi's Great Transformation criticizes self-regulating markets as aberrational, unnatural phenomena which tend towards social disruption.

In modern economics laissez-faire typically has a bad connotation, which hints towards a perceived need for restraint due to social needs and securities that can not be adequately responded to by companies with just a motive for making profit.

Robert Kuttner states that "for over a century, popular struggles in democracies have used the nation-state to temper raw capitalism. The power of voters has offset the power of capital. But as national barriers have come down in the name of freer commerce, so has the capacity of governments to manage capitalism in a broad public interest. So the real issue is not 'trade' but democratic governance".

The main issues of raw capitalism are said to lie in its disregard for quality, durability, sustainability, respect for the environment and human beings as well as a lack of morality. From this more critical angle, companies might naturally aim to maximise profits at the expense of workers' and broader social interests.

== See also ==
- Anarcho-capitalism – Political ideology and economic theory
- "Authoritarian liberalism", a term by Hermann Heller
- Libertarianism – Political philosophy based on liberty
- Crony capitalism – Capitalism featuring undue alliances between business interests and politicians
- Corporatism – Political ideology which advocates the organization of society by corporate groups
- Corporatocracy – Society controlled by business corporations
- Deregulation – Process of removing or reducing state regulations
- Economic liberalism – Political and economic ideology
- Free market – Form of market-based economy
- Free-market anarchism – Branch of anarchism
- Free trade – Absence of government restriction on international trade
- History of economic thought – Study of the development of economic thought
- Keynesian economics – Group of macroeconomic theories
- Market failure – Inefficiently allocated markets
- Market fundamentalism – Belief in an unregulated free market
- Market socialism – Economic system based on social ownership of the means of production in a market economy
- Mixed economy – Economic system with both capitalist and socialist elements
- Monopoly – Market structure with a single firm dominating the market
- Neoliberalism – Political ideology promoting free-market capitalism
- Objectivism – Philosophical system developed by Ayn Rand
- Physiocracy – School of thought in economics
- Privatization – Transferring something from the public sphere to the private
- Regulated market – Market regulated and/or controlled by the government
- Tragedy of the commons – Overuse of a shared resource
- Wu wei – Concept in Chinese philosophy favouring inaction

== Sources ==
- Branden, Barbara (1986). The Passion of Ayn Rand. Garden City, New York: Doubleday & Company. ISBN 0-385-19171-5. OCLC 12614728.
- Burns, Jennifer (2009). Goddess of the Market: Ayn Rand and the American Right. New York: Oxford University Press. ISBN 978-0-19-532487-7. OCLC 313665028.
- Den Uyl, Douglas & Rasmussen, Douglas, eds. (1986) [1984]. The Philosophic Thought of Ayn Rand (paperback ed.). Chicago: University of Illinois Press. ISBN 978-0-252-01407-9.
- Doherty, Brian (2007). Radicals for Capitalism: A Freewheeling History of the Modern American Libertarian Movement. New York: Public Affairs Press. ISBN 978-1-58648-350-0.
- Gotthelf, Allan (2000). On Ayn Rand. Wadsworth Publishing. ISBN 978-0-534-57625-7.
- Peikoff, Leonard (1991). Objectivism: The Philosophy of Ayn Rand. New York: Dutton. ISBN 978-0-452-01101-4.
- Merrill, Ronald E. (1991). The Ideas of Ayn Rand. La Salle, Illinois: Open Court Publishing. ISBN 0-8126-9157-1.
- Sciabarra, Chris Matthew (1995). Ayn Rand: The Russian Radical. University Park: Pennsylvania State University Press. ISBN 978-0-271-01440-1. OCLC 31133644.
