= Tableau économique =

18th century physiocratic economic model

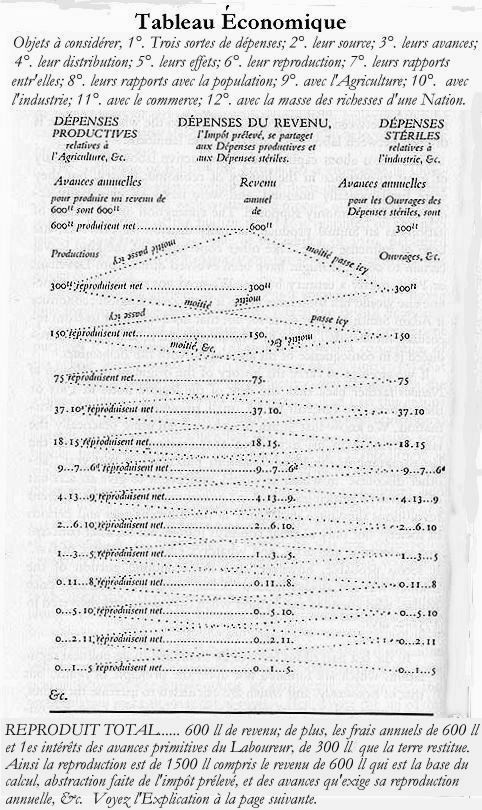
Illustration of the original visualisation of the Tableau by Quesnay, 1759

The Tableau économique (French pronunciation: [tablo ekɔnɔmik]) or Economic Table is an economic model first described by French economist François Quesnay in 1758, which laid the foundation of the physiocratic school of economics.

Quesnay believed that trade and industry were not sources of wealth, and instead in his 1758 manuscript Tableau économique (Economic Table) argued that agricultural surpluses, by flowing through the economy in the form of rent, wages, and purchases were the real economic movers.

== The model ==
The model Quesnay created consisted of three economic movers. The "Proprietary" class consisted of only landowners. The "Productive" class consisted of all agricultural laborers. The "Sterile" class is made up of artisans and merchants. The flow of production and/or cash between the three classes started with the Proprietary class because they own the land and they buy from both of the other classes. The process has these steps (consult Figure 1).

1. The farmer produces 1,500 food on land leased from the landlord. Of that 1,500, he retains 600 food to feed himself, his livestock, and any laborers he hires. He sells the remaining 900 in the market for $1 per unit of food. He keeps $300 ($150 for himself, $150 for his laborer) to buy non-farm goods (clothes, household goods, etc.) from the merchants and artisans. This produces $600 of net profit, to which Quesnay refers as product net.
2. The artisan produces 750 units of crafts. To produce at that level, he needs 300 units of food and 150 units of foreign goods. He also has subsistence need of 150 units of food and 150 units of crafts to keep himself alive during the year. The total is 450 units of food, 150 units of crafts, and 150 units of foreign goods. He buys $450 of food from the farmer and $150 of goods from the merchant, and he sells 600 units of crafts at the market for $600. Because the artisan must use the cash he made selling his crafts to buy raw materials for the next year’s production, he has no net profit.
3. The landlord is only a consumer of food and crafts and produces no product. His contribution to the production process is the redistribution of $600 in land rent the farmer pays for the use of naturally occurring land. The landlord uses $300 of the rent to buy food from the farmer in the market and $300 to buy crafts from the artisan. Because he is purely a consumer, Quesnay considers the landlord the prime mover of economic activity. It is his desire to consume which causes him to expend his entire lease income on food and crafts and which provides income to the other classes.
4. The merchant is the mechanism for exporting food in exchange for foreign imports. The merchant uses the $150 he received from the artisan to buy food from the market, and it is assumed that he takes the food out of the country to exchange it for more foreign goods.

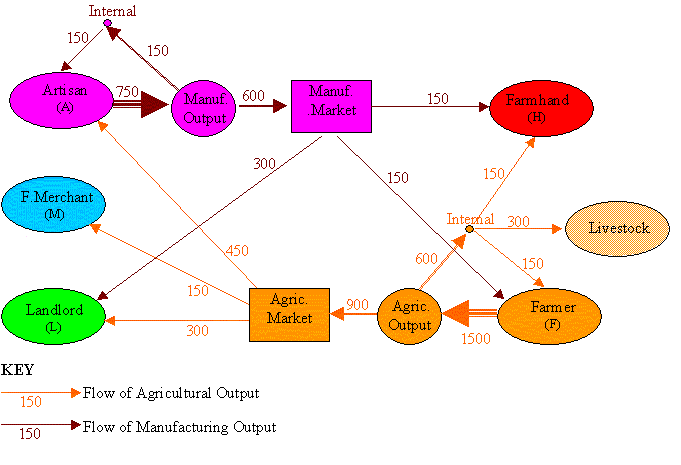

Figure 1 Production Flow Diagram for Quesnay's Tableau (4)

The Tableau shows the reason why the Physiocrats disagreed with Richard Cantillon about exporting food. The economy produces a surplus of food, and neither the farmer nor the artisan can afford to consume more than a subsistence level of food. The landlord is assumed to be consuming at a level of satiation; therefore, he cannot consume any more. Since food cannot be stored easily, it is necessary to sell it to someone who can use it. This is where the merchant provides value.

== Physiocratic interpretation ==
The merchant is not a source of wealth, however. The Physiocrats believed that “neither industry nor commerce generates wealth.” A “plausible explanation is that the Physiocrats developed their theory in light of the actual situation of the French economy…” France was an absolute monarchy with the land owners constituting 6-8% of the population and owning 50% of the land. (5, p. 859) Agriculture contributed to 80% of the country’s wealth, and the non-land owning segment of the population “practises a subsistence agriculture that produces the essential minimum, with virtually all income being absorbed by food requirements.” Additionally, exports consisted mostly of agricultural-based products, e.g. wine. Given the massive effect of agriculture on France’s economy, it was more likely they would develop an economic model that used it to the king’s advantage.

The Physiocrats were at the beginning of the anti-mercantilist movement. Quesnay’s argument against industry and international trade as alternatives to his doctrine is twofold. First, industry produces no gain in wealth; therefore, redirecting labor from agriculture to industry will in effect decrease the nation’s overall wealth. Additionally, population expands to fill available land and food supply; therefore, population must go down if the use of land does not produce food. Second, the basic premise of the Mercantilists is that a country must export more than it imports to gain wealth, but that assumes it has more of a tradeable resource than it needs for internal consumption. France did not have a colony with the ability to produce finished or semi-finished goods like England (e.g. India) or Holland (e.g. North America, Africa, South America). Its main colonial presence at the time was in the Caribbean and in North America (which was mainly wilderness), and like France, the colonies had agriculturally based economies. The only good which France had enough excess to export was food; therefore, international trade based on industrial production would not yield as much wealth.

Quesnay was not anti-industry, however. He was just realistic in his assessment that France was not in good position to incubate a strong industrial market. His argument was that artisans and manufacturers would come to France only in proportion to the size of the internal market for their goods. Quesnay believed “a country should concentrate on manufacturing only to the extent that the local availability of raw materials and suitable labor enabled it to have a cost advantage over its overseas competitors.” Anything above that amount should be purchased through trade.

== Legacy ==
The tableau économique is credited as the "first precise formulation" of interdependent systems in economics and the origin of the theory of the multiplier in economics. An analogous table is used in the theory of money creation under fractional-reserve banking by relending of deposits, leading to the money multiplier.

The wage-fund doctrine was derived from the tableau, then later rejected.

Karl Marx used Quesnay's Tableau as a basis for his theory of circulation in Capital volume 2.

== See also ==
- Agent-based computational economics
- Circular flow of income
- History of economic thought
- Mercantilism
- Political economy
