= Jacques Claude Marie Vincent de Gournay =

French economist

Jacques Claude Marie Vincent de Gournay (French: [də ɡuʁnɛ]; 28 May 1712, Saint-Malo, Province of Brittany – 27 June 1759, Cádiz), was a French economist, who became an intendant of commerce. Some historians of economics believe that he coined the phrase laissez faire, laissez passer. He is also credited with coining the term "bureaucracy". Together with François Quesnay, whose disciple he was, he was a leader of the Physiocratic School.

Gournay's father was Claude Vincent, a merchant in Saint-Malo as well as a secretary to the king. Gournay himself spent much of his early career as a merchant in Cádiz from 1729 to 1744; the death of his business partner in 1746 allowed him to withdraw from active trade two years later and devote himself to public life and the study of economics. Gournay didn't write much, but had a great influence on French economic thought through his conversations with many important theorists. He became instrumental in popularizing the work of Richard Cantillon in France.

Gournay was appointed an intendant du commerce in 1751. One of the main themes of his term in office was his opposition to government regulations because of what he saw as the way they stunted commerce. He coined the term bureaucratie (lit. 'government by desks') to describe the situation. Gournay's disdain for government regulation of commerce influenced his disciple Turgot.

Gournay's first name is often mistakenly given as "Jean", due to an error made by Turgot in his letter to Jean-François Marmontel known as In Praise of Gournay.

A street in Saint-Malo, the Rue Vincent-de-Gournay, takes its name from him.
