= Physiocracy =

School of thought in economics

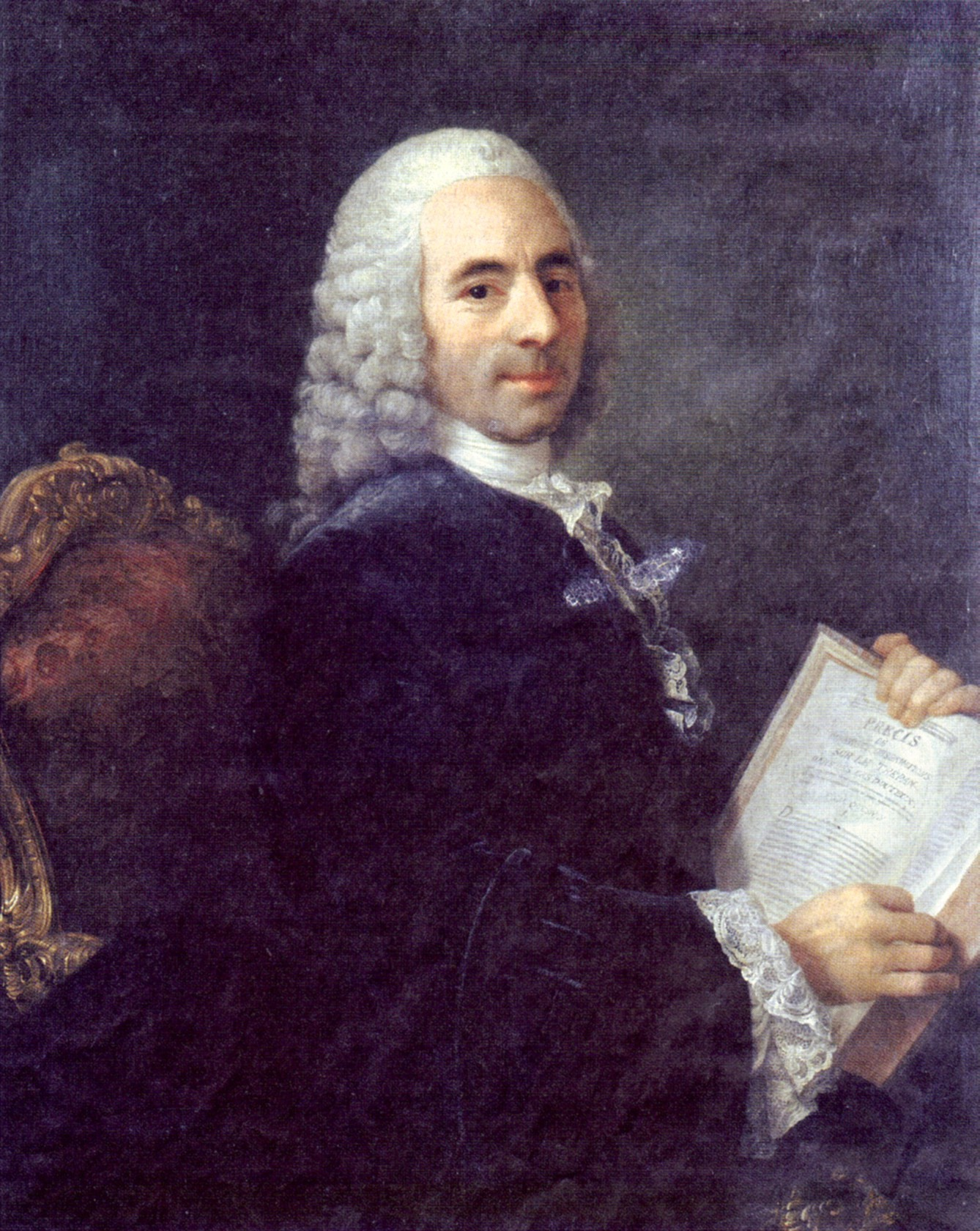
François Quesnay, a physician who is considered the founding father of physiocracy, published the "Tableau économique" (Economic Table) in 1758

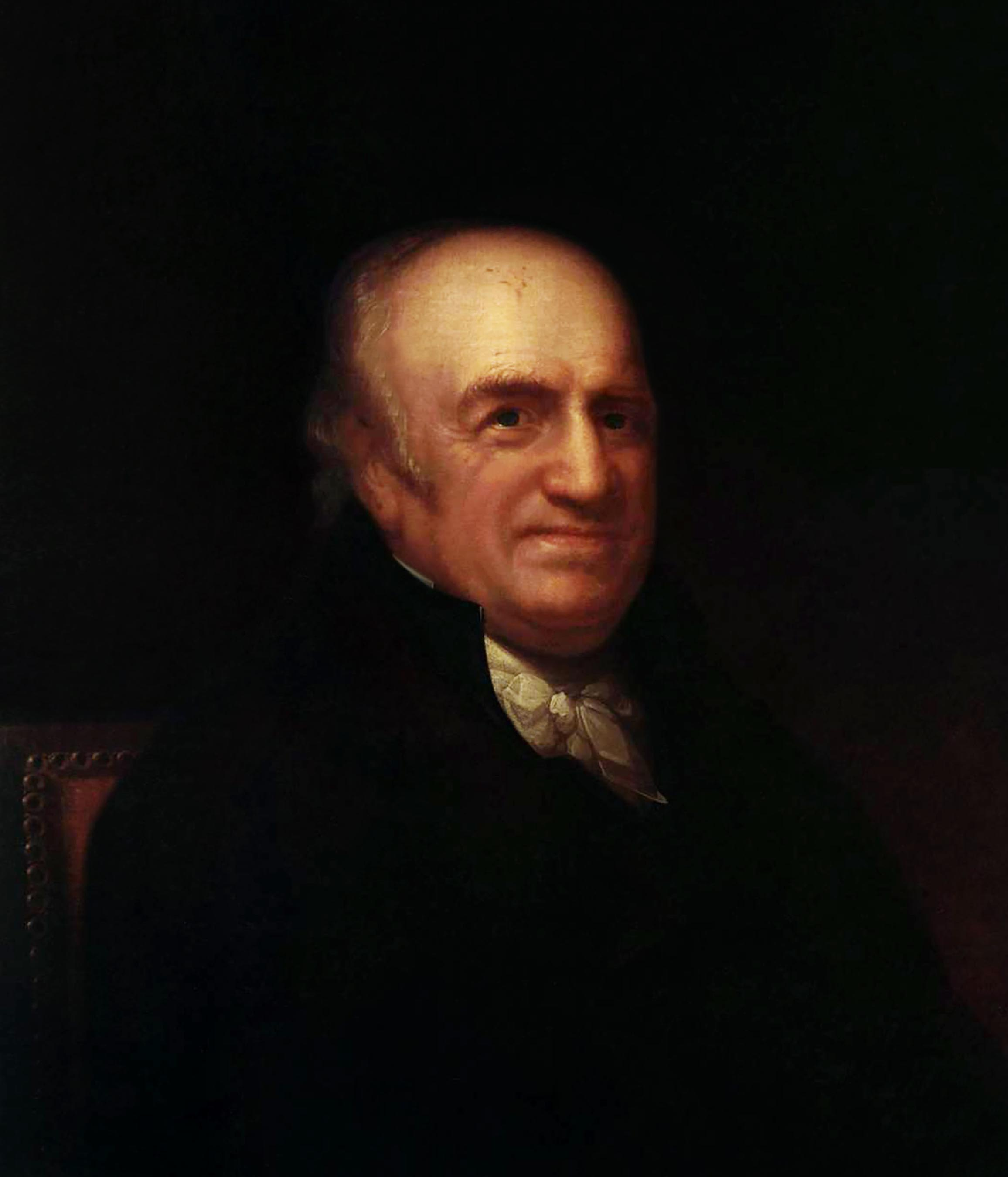
Pierre Samuel du Pont de Nemours, a prominent physiocrat. In his book La Physiocratie, du Pont advocated low tariffs and free trade.

Physiocracy (French: physiocratie; from the Greek for "government of nature") is an economic theory developed by a group of 18th-century Age of Enlightenment French economists. They believed that the wealth of nations derived solely from the value of "land agriculture" or "land development" and that agricultural products should be highly priced. Their theories originated in France and were most popular during the second half of the 18th century. Physiocracy became one of the first well-developed theories of economics. Physiocratic governments made significant positive influence on national economies by developing land for agricultural use, building roads and canals for agricultural trade and utilizing trade as a mechanism for benefiting from surplus agricultural produce; strengthening currencies and balance of payments. It is thus today known as an unintended means to an end.

François Quesnay (1694–1774), the Marquis de Mirabeau (1715–1789) and Anne-Robert-Jacques Turgot (1727–1781) dominated the movement, which immediately preceded the first modern school, classical economics, which began with the publication of Adam Smith's The Wealth of Nations in 1776.

The physiocrats made a significant contribution in their emphasis on productive work as the source of national wealth. This contrasted with earlier schools, in particular mercantilism, which often focused on the ruler's wealth, accumulation of gold, or the balance of trade. Whereas the mercantilist school of economics held that value in the products of society was created at the point of sale, by the seller exchanging his products for more money than the products had "previously" been worth, the physiocratic school of economics was the first to see labor as the sole source of value. For the physiocrats, however, only agricultural labor created this value in the products of society. All "industrial" and non-agricultural labors were "unproductive appendages" to agricultural labor.

Quesnay was likely influenced by his medical training, particularly by the work of William Harvey who explained how blood flow and the circulatory system is vital to the human body; Quesnay held that the circulation of wealth was vital to the economy. Societies at the time were also overwhelmingly agrarian. This may be why they viewed agriculture as the primary source of a nation's wealth. This is an idea that Quesnay purported to demonstrate with data, comparing a workshop to a farm. He analyzed "how money flowed between the three classes of farmers, proprietors, and artisans, in the same mechanical way that blood flows between different organs" and claimed only the farm produced a surplus that added to the nation's wealth. Physiocrats viewed the production of goods and services as equivalent to the consumption of the agricultural surplus, since human or animal muscle provided the main source of power and all energy derived from the surplus from agricultural production. Profit in capitalist production was really only the "rent" obtained by the owner of the land on which the agricultural production took place.

"The physiocrats damned cities for their artificiality and praised what they considered to be more natural styles of living. They celebrated farmers." They called themselves les Économistes, but are generally referred to as "physiocrats" to distinguish their beliefs from the many schools of economic thought that followed.

== History ==
=== Ancient precursors ===
Physiocracy is an agrarianist philosophy that developed in the context of the predominantly rural, pre-industrial European society of the time. In the late Roman Republic, the dominant senatorial class was not allowed to engage in banking or commerce but relied on their latifundia, large plantations, for income. They circumvented this rule through freedmen proxies who sold surplus agricultural goods.

Other inspiration came from China's economic system, then the largest in the world. Chinese society broadly distinguished four occupations, with scholar-bureaucrats (who were also agrarian landlords) at the top and merchants at the bottom (because they did not produce but only distributed goods made by others). Leading physiocrats like François Quesnay were avid Confucians who advocated China's agrarian policies. Some scholars have advocated connections with the school of agriculturalism, which promoted utopian communalism. One of the integral parts of physiocracy, laissez-faire, was adopted from Quesnay's writings on China, being a translation of the Chinese Taoism term wu wei. The concept natural order of physiocracy originated from "Way of Nature" of Chinese Taoism.

=== 1700s ===
The growing power of the centralized state control in the era of enlightened absolutism necessitated centralized, systematic information on the nation. A major innovation was the collection, use and interpretation of numerical and statistical data, ranging from trade statistics, harvest reports, and death notices to population censuses. Starting in the 1760s, officials in France and Germany began increasingly to rely on quantitative data for systematic planning, especially regarding long-term economic growth. It combined the utilitarian agenda of "enlightened absolutism" with the new ideas being developed in economics. In Germany the trend was especially strong in Cameralism while in France it was an important theme in physiocracy.

Pierre Le Pesant, sieur de Boisguilbert served as a member of Louis XIV's local administration of Paris, and wrote pamphlets and booklets on subjects related to his work: taxation, grain trade, and money. Le Pesant asserted that wealth came from self-interest and markets were connected by money flows (i.e. an expense for the buyer is revenue for the producer). Thus he realized that lowering prices in times of shortage – common at the time – was dangerous economically as it acted as a disincentive to production. Generally, Le Pesant advocated less government interference in the grain market, as any such interference would generate "anticipations" that would prevent the policy from working.

For instance, if the government bought corn abroad, some people would speculate that there was likely to be a shortage and would buy more corn, leading to higher prices and more of a shortage. This was an early example of advocacy of free trade. In anonymously published tracts, Vauban proposed a system known as la dîme royale ('the royal tithe'): this involved major simplification of the French tax code by switching to a relatively flat tax on property and trade. Vauban's use of statistics contrasted with earlier empirical methods in economics.

The event that led Mirabeau to devote himself to political economy was undoubtedly his work on a manuscript of Richard Cantillon's Essai sur la nature du commerce en général (Essay on the nature of commerce in general), which he had in his possession as early as 1740. He elaborated a commentary of this text that gradually became his Ami des hommes (Friend of men).

Around the time of the Seven Years' War between France and England (1756–1763), the physiocracy movement grew. Several journals appeared, signaling an increasing audience in France for new economic ideas. Among the most important were the Journal Œconomique (1721–1772), which promoted agronomy and rational husbandry, and the Journal du commerce (1759–1762), which was heavily influenced by the Irishman Richard Cantillon (1680–1734), both dominated by physiocrats; the Journal de l'agriculture, du commerce et des finances (1765–1774) and the Ephémérides du citoyen (Citizen's Ephemeris; 1767–1772 and 1774–1776).

Also, Vincent de Gournay (1712–1759), the Intendant du commerce, brought together a group of young researchers including François Véron Duverger de Forbonnais (1722–1800) and one of the two most famous physiocrats, Anne-Robert-Jacques Turgot (1727–1781). The other, François Quesnay (1694–1774), was among those writing prolifically in contemporaneous journals.

=== 1800s to present ===
The ideas of the Physiocrats had an influence on Adam Smith, David Ricardo, and John Stuart Mill, as well as Henry George and Silvio Gesell, who appear to have come to similar beliefs independently. George was the driving force behind what became known as the Single Tax movement (not to be confused with Flat Tax). The Single Tax is a proposal for the use of the annual rental value of land (land value taxation) as the principal or sole source of public revenue.

The New Physiocratic League is a modern Georgist political movement that seeks to revive elements of physiocracy.

== Tableau économique ==
The Tableau économique or Economic Table is an economic model first described by François Quesnay in 1759, which laid the foundation of the physiocrats' economic theories. It also contains the origins of modern ideas on the circulation of wealth and the nature of interrelationships in the economy.

The model Quesnay created consisted of three economic agents: the "proprietary" class consisted only of landowners; the "productive" class consisted of agricultural laborers; the "sterile" class was made up of artisans and merchants. The flow of production and cash between the three classes originated with the proprietary class because they owned the land and bought from both of the other classes.

== Characteristics ==
=== Natural order ===
The physiocrats thought there was a "natural order" that allowed human beings to live together. Men did not come together via a somewhat arbitrary "social contract." Rather, they had to discover the laws of the natural order that would allow individuals to live in society without losing significant freedoms. This concept of natural order had originated in China. The Chinese had believed that there can be good government only when a perfect harmony exists between the "Way of Man" (governmental institutions) and the "Way of Nature" (Quesnay's natural order).

=== Individualism and laissez-faire ===
The physiocrats, especially Turgot, believed that self-interest was the motivation for each segment of the economy to play its role. Each individual is best suited to determine what goods they want and what work would provide them with what they want out of life. Although a person might labor for the benefit of others, they will work harder for their own benefit; nonetheless, each person's needs are being supplied by many other people. The system works best when there is a complementary relationship between one person's needs and another person's desires, and so trade restrictions place an unnatural barrier to achieving one's goals. Laissez-faire was popularized by physiocrat Vincent de Gournay who is said to have adopted the term from François Quesnay's writings on China.

=== Private property ===
None of the theories concerning the value of land could work without strong legal support for the ownership of private property. Combined with the strong sense of individualism, private property becomes a critical component of the Tableau's functioning. The physiocrats believed in the institution of private property. They saw property as a tree and its branches, as social institutions. They actually stated that landlords must enjoy 2/5 on the land surpluses. They also advocated that landlords should be given dues, otherwise they would take the land away from the cultivators.

=== Diminishing returns ===
Turgot was one of the first to recognize that "successive applications of the variable input will cause the product to grow, first at an increasing rate, later at a diminishing rate until it reaches a maximum." This was a recognition that the productivity gains required to increase national wealth had an ultimate limit, and, therefore, wealth could not be infinite.

=== Investment capital ===
Both Quesnay and Anne Robert Jacques Turgot, Baron de Laune recognized that capital was needed by farmers to start the production process, and both were proponents of using some of each year's profits to increase productivity. Capital was also needed to sustain the laborers while they produced their product. Turgot recognizes that there is opportunity cost and risk involved in using capital for something other than land ownership, and he promotes interest as serving a "strategic function in the economy."

== See also ==
- Classical liberalism
- Flour War
- Free market
- French Liberal School
- Geolibertarianism
- Jeffersonian democracy

=== People ===
- Honoré Gabriel Riqueti, comte de Mirabeau
- Pierre-Paul Lemercier de La Rivière de Saint-Médard
- Nicolas Baudeau
- Mykola Rudenko
