= Joseph Michel Antoine Servan =

Joseph Michel Antoine Servan (November 3, 1737 – 1807) was a French publicist and lawyer.

He was born at Romans (Dauphiné). After studying law he was appointed avocat-general at the parlement of Grenoble at the age of twenty-seven. In his Discours sur l'administration de la Justice Criminelle (1767) he made an eloquent protest against legal abuses and the severity of the criminal code. In 1767 he gained great repute for his defense of a Protestant woman who, as a result of the revocation of the Edict of Nantes, had been abandoned by her Catholic husband.

In 1772, however, on the parlement refusing to accede to his request that a present made by a grand seigneur to a singer should be annulled on the ground of immorality, he resigned, and went into retirement. He excused himself on the score of ill health from sitting in the States General of 1789, to which he had been elected deputy, and refused to take his seat in the Corps Législatif under the Empire.

Among his writings may be mentioned Reflexions sur les Confessions de J.-J. Rousseau (1783) and Essai sur La formation des assemblées nationales, provinciales, et municipales (1789). His Œuvres choisies and Œuvres inédites have been published by De Portets. His brother Joseph Servan de Gerbey (1741-1808) was war minister in the Girondist ministry of 1792.

See "Lettres inédites de Servan," in Souvenirs et mémoires (vol. iv., Paris, 1900).

Michel Foucault's quotation of Servan who he mentioned as belonging to an influential group called the Idéologues in his seminal work on prisons, Discipline and Punish provides an illuminating insight into the mind of Servan:

The ideas of crime and punishment must be strongly linked and ‘follow one another without interruption… When you have thus formed the chain of ideas in the heads of your citizens, you will then be able to pride yourselves on guiding them and being their masters. A stupid despot may constrain his slaved with iron chains; but a true politician binds them even more strongly by the chain of their own ideas; it is at the stable point of reason that he secures the end of the chain; this link is all the stronger in that we do not know of what it is made and we believe it to be our own work; despair and time eat away at the bonds of iron and steel, but they are powerless against the habitual union of ideas, they can only tighten it still more’ and on the soft fibers of the brain is founded the unshakable base of the soundest empires’.
