= Nicolas Baudeau =

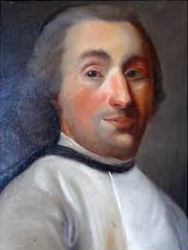
Nicolas Baudeau

Nicolas Baudeau (French: [bodo]; 25 April 1730 – 1792) was a Catholic cleric, theologian and economist, who was born in Amboise, France.

== Biography ==
Baudeau became a monk at Chancelade Abbey, where he taught theology.

In 1765 he founded the first economics periodical to be published in France, Éphémérides du citoyen, and was at first an opponent of the physiocrats. In 1766, however, he became a proponent of physiocracy. He died in Paris in 1792.

The French word "économiste" first appeared in print in a book by Baudeau. Early usage of the concept of an "entrepreneur" can also be attributed to Baudeau.

One of Baudeau's influential works, Idées d'un citoyen sur l'administration des finances du Roi, was critical of the commission established in 1764 by Clément Charles François de Laverdy for the purpose of drafting new laws on vagabonds, beggars, and the central distribution of alms. Baudeau argued that the governmental provision of alms to the poor was a more important goal than the passing of laws prohibiting poverty.

In 1768, Baudeau was recruited by Ignacy Jakub Massalski, the Bishop of Vilnius, in order to bring physiocratic ideas to Poland. The main focus of his work there had to do with facilitating exports of Polish grain to France.

Baudeau died in Paris in 1792. Nineteenth-century biographical sources, such as Coquelin and Guillaumin's *Dictionnaire de l’économie politique* (1854), reported that he died insane, while later accounts emphasize that he died in poverty and destitution during the early years of the French Revolution.

== Works ==
- Explication du tableau économique (in French). Paris: EDHIS. 1967 [1776].
