= List of people considered father or mother of a scientific field =

The following is a list of people who are considered a "father" or "mother" (or "founding father" or "founding mother") of a scientific field. Such people are generally regarded to have made the first significant contributions to and/or delineation of that field; they may also be seen as "a" rather than "the" father or mother of the field. Debate over who merits the title can be perennial.

== Science as a whole ==
| Field | Person/s considered "father" or "mother" | Rationale |
|---|---|---|
| Science (modern) | Galileo Galilei (1564–1642); Isaac Newton (1643–1727) | For systemic use of experimentation in science and contributions to scientific method, physics and observational astronomy. The work of Principia by Newton, who also refined the scientific method, and who is widely regarded as the most important figure of the Scientific Revolution. |
| Science (ancient) | Thales (c. 624/623 – c. 548/545 BCE) | Attempted to explain natural phenomena without recourse to mythology |

== Natural sciences ==
=== Biology ===
| Field | Person/s considered "father" or "mother" | Rationale |
|---|---|---|
| Zoology | Aristotle (384–322 BCE) | His contributions to the field include vast quantities of information about the variety, structure, and behavior of animals |
| Bacteriology | Robert Koch (1843–1910); Ferdinand Cohn (1828–1898); Louis Pasteur (1822–1895) | First to produce precise, correct descriptions of bacteria. |
| Bacteriology | Antonie van Leeuwenhoek (1632–1723) | First to produce precise, correct descriptions of bacteria. |
| Biogeography | Alfred Russel Wallace (1823–1913) | "... Often described as the Father of Biogeography, Wallace shows the impact of human activity on the natural world." |
| Bioinformatics | Margaret Oakley Dayhoff (1925–1983) | "... the mother and father of bioinformatics", according to David J. Lipman, former director of the National Center for Biotechnology Information. |
| Biology (Note: A name suggested in 1802 by the German naturalist Gottfried Reinhold Treviranus and introduced as a scientific term later that year by Jean-Baptiste Lamarck.) | Aristotle (384–322 BCE) | |
| Botany | Theophrastus (c. 371 – c. 287 BCE) | |
| Botany | Otto Brunfels (1488–1534); Hieronymus Bock (1498–1554); Leonhart Fuchs (1501–1566) | The three German fathers of botany. |
| Bryology | Johann Hedwig (1730–1799) | |
| Cheloniology | Archie Carr (1909–1987) | |
| Ecology | Carl Linnaeus (1707–1778); Ernst Haeckel (1834–1919); Eugenius Warming (1841–1924) | Linnaeus founded an early branch of ecology that he called The Economy of Nature (1772), Haeckel coined the term "ecology" (German: Oekologie, Ökologie) (1866), Warming authored the first book on plant ecology. Plantesamfund (1895). |
| Modern elk management | Olaus Murie (1889–1963) | |
| Entomology | Jan Swammerdam (1637–1680) | |
| Entomology | Johan Christian Fabricius (1745–1808) | Fabricius described and published information on over 10,000 insects and refined Linnaeus's system of classification. |
| Entomology | William Kirby (1759–1850) | |
| Ethology | Nikolaas Tinbergen (1907–1988); Karl von Frisch (1886–1982); Konrad Lorenz (1903–1989) | The modern discipline of ethology is generally considered to have begun during the 1930s with the work of Nikolaas Tinbergen, Konrad Lorenz and Karl von Frisch, joint awardees of the 1973 Nobel Prize in Physiology or Medicine. |
| Evolution; Natural selection | Charles Darwin (1809–1882) | On the Origin of Species (1859). |
| Genetics | Gregor Mendel (1822–1884) | For his study of the inheritance of traits in pea plants, which forms the basis for Mendelian inheritance |
| Genetics | William Bateson (1861–1926) | Proponent of Mendelism. |
| Gerontology | Élie Metchnikoff (1845–1916) | Coined the term "gerontology" (1903). He was the first to perform systematic research on the effects of certain foods on lifespan and healthspan, developed the concept of probiotic diet that promotes long healthy life. |
| Herpetology | John Edwards Holbrook (1796–1871) | "John Edwards Holbrook... was considered by many to be the Father of Herpetology." |
| Ichthyology | Peter Artedi (1705–1735) | "Far greater than either of these... was he who has been justly called the Father of Ichthyology, Petrus (Peter) Artedi (1705–1735)." |
| Immunology | Edward Jenner (1749–1823) | Pioneered the concept of vaccines including creating the smallpox vaccine, the world's first vaccine (in 1796). |
| Innate (natural) immunity | Élie Metchnikoff (1845–1916) | Research of phagocytosis by macrophages and microphages as a critical host-defense mechanism. |
| Humoral immunity | Paul Ehrlich (1854–1915) | Described the side-chain theory of antibody formation and the mechanisms of how antibodies neutralize toxins and induce bacterial lysis with the help of complement. |
| Lichenology | Erik Acharius (1757–1819) | "Erik Acharius, the father of lichenology..." |
| Microbiology | Antonie van Leeuwenhoek (1632–1723) / Louis Pasteur (1822–1895) | The first to microscopically observe micro-organisms in water and the first to see bacteria. |
| Molecular biology | Linus Pauling (1901–1994) | |
| Molecular biophysics | Gopalasamudram Narayana Iyer Ramachandran (1922–2001) | Founded the [world's first?] molecular biophysics unit (1970). |
| Paleontology | Leonardo da Vinci (1452–1519); Georges Cuvier (1769–1832) | |
| Parasitology | Francesco Redi (1626–1697) | The founder of experimental biology and the first person to challenge the theory of spontaneous generation by demonstrating that maggots come from eggs of flies. |
| Population genetics | Ronald A. Fisher, Sewall Wright, J. B. S. Haldane | |
| Protozoology | Antonie van Leeuwenhoek (1632–1723) | First to produce precise, correct descriptions of protozoa. |
| Quantitative genetics | Ronald A. Fisher | |
| Taxonomy | Carl Linnaeus (1707–1778) | Devised the system of naming living organisms that became universally accepted in the scientific world. |
| Virology | Martinus Beijerinck (1851–1931) | Studies of agricultural microbiology and industrial microbiology that yielded fundamental discoveries. |

=== Chemistry ===
| Field | Person/s considered "father" or "mother" | Rationale |
|---|---|---|
| Atomic theory (early) | Democritus (c. 460 – c. 370 BCE) | Founder of atomism in cosmology. |
| Atomic theory (modern) | Father Roger Boscovich (1711–1787) | First coherent description of atomic theory. |
| Atomic theory (modern) | John Dalton (1766–1844) | First scientific description of the atom as a building block for more complex structures. |
| Atomic bomb | J. Robert Oppenheimer (1904–1967) | Served as the director of the Manhattan Project's Los Alamos Laboratory during World War II. He is often called the "father of the atomic bomb" for his role in overseeing the development of the first nuclear weapons. |
| Chemical thermodynamics (modern) | Gilbert Lewis (1875–1946); Willard Gibbs (1839–1903); Merle Randall (1888–1950); Edward Guggenheim (1901–1970) | Thermodynamics and the Free Energy of Chemical Substances (1923) and Modern Thermodynamics by the Methods of Willard Gibbs (1933), which made a major contribution to the use of thermodynamics in chemistry. |
| Chemistry (modern) | Antoine Lavoisier (1743–1794) | Elements of Chemistry (1787) |
| Chemistry (modern) | Robert Boyle (1627–1691) | The Sceptical Chymist (1661) |
| Chemistry (modern) | Jöns Berzelius (1779–1848) | Development of chemical nomenclature (1800s) |
| Chemistry (modern) | John Dalton (1766–1844) | Revival of atomic theory (1803) |
| Green chemistry | Paul Anastas (born 1962) | Design and manufacture of chemicals that are non-hazardous and environmentally benign. |
| Nuclear chemistry | Otto Hahn (1879–1968) | Applied Radiochemistry (1936); First person to split an atomic nucleus (nuclear fission, 1938); Nobel Prize in Chemistry for this discovery (1944) |
| Periodic table | Dmitri Mendeleev (1834–1907) | Arranged the sixty-six elements known at the time in order of atomic weight by periodic intervals (1869). |
| Physical chemistry | Mikhail Lomonosov (1711–1765) | The first to read lectures in physical chemistry and coin the term (1752). |
| Physical chemistry | Jacobus van 't Hoff (1852–1911) | Jacobus van 't Hoff is considered one of the founders of the discipline of physical chemistry. His work helped found the discipline as it is today. |
| Physical chemistry | Svante Arrhenius (1859–1927) | Devised much of the theoretical foundation for physical chemistry. On the Equilibrium of Heterogeneous Substances (1876), Thermodynamik chemischer Vorgange (1882). |
| Physical chemistry | Wilhelm Ostwald (1853–1932) | "Wilhelm Ostwald is considered one of the founders of the discipline of physical chemistry..." |
| Physical chemistry | Hermann von Helmholtz (1821–1894) | |
| Theory of Chemical structure | August Kekulé (1829–1896) | Discovered the structure of the benzene ring (1865) and pioneered structural chemistry in general |

=== Earth sciences ===
| Field | Person/s considered "father" or "mother" | Rationale |
|---|---|---|
| Geochemistry (modern) | Victor Goldschmidt (1888–1947) | For developing the Goldschmidt classification of elements. |
| Early geodesy (mathematical geography) | Eratosthenes (c. 276 – 195/194 BCE) | Eratosthenes was first to write the word Geography (from Geo- and -graphy, literally "writing about the Earth") |
| Geodesy (modern) | Al-Biruni (973 – c. 1050) | |
| Geology (modern) | Georgius Agricola (1494–1555) | Wrote the first book on physical geology, De Ortu et Causis Subterraneorum (1546) |
| Geology (modern) | Nicolas Steno (1638–1686) | For setting down most of the principles of modern geology. |
| Geology (modern) | James Hutton (1726–1797) | For formulating uniformitarianism and the Plutonic theory. |
| Geotechnical engineering (Soil mechanics) | Karl von Terzaghi (1883–1963) | |
| Limnology (modern) | G. Evelyn Hutchinson (1903–1991) | |
| Mineralogy | Georgius Agricola (1494–1555) | |
| Meteorology; Naval oceanography (modern) | Matthew Fontaine Maury (1806–1873) | |
| Plate tectonics | Alfred Wegener (1880–1930) | |
| Acoustical oceanography | Leonid Brekhovskikh (1917–2005) | |
| Stratigraphy | Nicolas Steno (1638–1686) | |
| Speleology | Édouard-Alfred Martel (1859–1938) | Began the first systematic exploration of cave systems and promoted speleology as a field separate from geology. |

=== Medicine and physiology ===
| Field | Person/s considered "father" or "mother" | Rationale |
|---|---|---|
| Anatomy (modern) | Marcello Malpighi (1628–1694) | |
| Biophysics | Henri Dutrochet (1776–1847) | Discovered osmosis |
| Biophysics | Hermann von Helmholtz (1821–1894) | Explained hearing and vision. |
| Biomechanics | Christian Wilhelm Braune (1831–1892) | First to describe the methodology of human gait (walking). |
| Bioelectromagnetics | Luigi Galvani (1737–1798) | First to discover animal electricity through a series of experiments in 1780. |
| Cardiovascular physiology | Ibn al-Nafis (1213–1288) | Father of circulatory and cardiovascular physiology. |
| Cognitive therapy | Aaron T. Beck (1921–2021) | "In developing ways to do this, Beck became the father of cognitive therapy, one of the most important developments in psychotherapy in the last 50 years." |
| Cryonics | Robert Ettinger (1918–2011) | 1962 book, The Prospect of Immortality |
| Dentistry | Pierre Fauchard (1679–1761) | Widely known for writing the first complete scientific description of dentistry, Le Chirurgien Dentiste. |
| Electrophysiology | Emil du Bois-Reymond (1818–1896) | The discoverer of nerve action potential. |
| Emergency medicine | Peter Safar (1924–2003); Frank Pantridge (1916–2004) | Safar pioneered CPR, intensive-care units and developed standards for EMT, ambulance design and equipment.; Pantridge: |
| Epidemiology (modern) | John Snow (1813–1858) | Determining the cause of the 1854 Broad Street cholera outbreak with a combination of public interviews and mapping |
| Gastrointestinal physiology | William Beaumont (1785–1853) | |
| Gynaecology | J. Marion Sims (1813–1883) | |
| Histology | Marcello Malpighi (1628–1694) | |
| Human anatomy (modern) | Vesalius (1514–1564) | De humani corporis fabrica (1543) |
| Medical genetics | Victor McKusick (1921–2008) | Mendelian Inheritance in Man (started publishing in 1966) |
| Medicine (early) | Imhotep (late 27th century BCE); Charaka (3rd century BCE); Hippocrates (c. 460 – 370 BCE); Ibn-Sina (980–1037) | Historical legends following his death, with little evidence.; Wrote the Charaka Samhitā and founded the Ayurveda system of medicine.; Prescribed professional practices for physicians through the Hippocratic Oath. |
| Medicine (modern) | Sir William Osler (1849–1919) | |
| Neuroscience(modern) | Santiago Ramón y Cajal(1852–1934) | Discovered that the nervous system is made up of individual, discrete cells (neurons) rather than a continuous net, establishing the foundation of modern neuroscience. |
| Neurosurgery | Harvey Cushing (1869–1939) | Developed techniques that considerably reduced the risks involved with brain surgery in the early 20th century. |
| Nutrition (modern) | Justus von Liebig (1803–1873); Antoine-Laurent Lavoisier (1743–1794) | "Justus Von Liebig, the 'father of modern nutrition', developed the perfect infant food. It consisted of [...]"; "In addition to being known as the Father of Modern Chemistry, Lavoisier is also considered the Father of Modern Nutrition, as the first to discover the metabolism that occurs inside the human body..." |
| Organ transplantation | Thomas Starzl (1926–2017) | Performed the first human liver transplant and established the clinical utility of anti-rejection drugs including ciclosporin. Developed major advances in organ preservation, procurement and transplantation. |
| Orthopedic surgery (modern) | Hugh Owen Thomas (1834–1891) | He stressed the importance of rest in treatment and was responsible for many landmark contributions to orthopaedic surgery. He was especially celebrated for his design and use of splints; the famous Thomas knee splint was still in wide use at the end of World War II. |
| Psychology | Wilhelm Wundt (1832–1920) | Founded the first laboratory for psychological research, thereby establishing psychology as a distinct science. Wundt is also regarded as the father of experimental psychology. |
| Pediatrics | Muhammad ibn Zakarīya Rāzi ("Rhazes") (c. 865 – 925 CE) | Wrote The Diseases of Children, the first book to deal with pediatrics as an independent field. |
| Physiology | François Magendie (1783–1855) | Précis élementaire de Physiologie (1816) |
| Physical culture | Bernarr Macfadden (1868–1955) | "It delighted the heart of our old friend Bernarr Macfadden, 'the Father of Physical Culture,' when we told him how much athletic activity and good sportsmanship had to do with the rehabilitation of boys." |
| Plastic surgery | Sushruta (sixth century?); Harold Gillies (1882–1960) | Wrote the Sushruta Samhita (ancient) |
| Psychoanalysis | Sigmund Freud (1856–1939) | |
| Psychophysics | Ernst Heinrich Weber (1795–1878); Gustav Fechner (1801–1887) | Formulating the Weber–Fechner law in Elements of Psychophysics (1860). This publication is regarded as the beginning of psychophysics. Fechner also coined the term psychophysics. |
| Space medicine | Hubertus Strughold (1898–1986) | "After Wernher von Braun, he was the top Nazi scientist employed by the American government, and he was subsequently hailed by NASA as the 'father of space medicine'" |
| Surgery (early) | Sushruta (sixth century?) | Wrote the Sushruta Samhita (878 CE?) |
| Surgery (modern) | Abu al-Qasim ("Abulcasis") al-Zahrawi (936–1013); Guy de Chauliac (1300–1368); Ambroise Paré (1510–1590); John Hunter (1728–1793); Joseph Lister (1827–1912); William Stewart Halsted (1852–1922); See also Father of modern surgery | Kitab al-Tasrif (1000 CE).; Chirurgia magna; Leader in surgical techniques, especially the treatment of wounds.; Experimental, scientific approach to surgery.; Use of carbolic acid as an antiseptic.; Introduction of residency system in the United States. |
| Toxicology | Paracelsus (1493/1494 – 1541) | |

=== Physics and astronomy ===
| Field | Person/s considered "father" or "mother" | Rationale |
|---|---|---|
| Acoustics | Ernst Chladni | For important research in vibrating plates |
| Atomic bomb | Enrico Fermi; J. Robert Oppenheimer; Leslie Groves; Edward Teller | For their role in the Manhattan Project |
| Aerodynamics | Nikolai Zhukovsky; George Cayley | Zhukovsky was the first to undertake the study of airflow, was the first engineer scientist to explain mathematically the origin of aerodynamic lift. Cayley Investigated theoretical aspects of flight and experimented with flight a century before the first airplane was built |
| Civil engineering | John Smeaton | |
| Classical mechanics | Isaac Newton (founder) | Described laws of motion and law of gravity in Philosophiæ Naturalis Principia Mathematica (1687) |
| Electrical Engineering | Michael Faraday | Invented the generator, the first DC electric motor, the transformer, and also discovered Faraday's Law of Induction (1831) |
| Pre-Maxwell Electrodynamics | André-Marie Ampère | Book: Memoir on the Mathematical Theory of Electrodynamic Phenomena, Uniquely Deduced from Experience (1827) |
| Energetics | Willard Gibbs | Publication: On the Equilibrium of Heterogeneous Substances (1876) |
| Meteoritics | Ernst Chladni | First to publish in modern Western thought (in 1794) the then audacious idea that meteorites are rocks from space. |
| Modern astronomy | Nicolaus Copernicus | Developed the first explicit heliocentric model in De revolutionibus orbium coelestium (1543) |
| Nuclear astrophysics | Hans Bethe | Wrote a famous paper in 1938 on stellar nucleosynthesis |
| Nuclear physics | Ernest Rutherford | Developed the Rutherford atom model (1909) |
| Nuclear science | Marie Curie; Pierre Curie | |
| Optics | Ibn al-Haytham (Alhazen) | Correctly explained vision and carried out the first experiments on light and optics in the Book of Optics (1021). |
| Physical cosmology | Georges Lemaître (founder) Albert Einstein; Henrietta Leavitt (mother); Edwin Hubble (father) | Monsignor Lemaître is considered "the Father of the Big Bang" and the first to derive what is now known as Hubble's law. Leavitt discovered Cepheid variables, the "Standard Candle" by which Hubble later determined galactic distances. Einstein's general theory of relativity is usually recognized as the theoretic foundation of modern cosmology. |
| Physics (modern) | Galileo Galilei | His development and extensive use of experimental physics, e.g. the telescope |
| Plasma physics | Irving Langmuir; Hannes Alfvén | Langmuir first described ionised gas as plasma and observed fundamental plasma vibrations, Langmuir waves. Alfvén pioneered the theoretical description of plasma by developing magnetohydrodynamics. |
| Quantum mechanics | Max Planck | Stated that electromagnetic energy could be emitted only in quantized form |
| Relativity | Albert Einstein (founder) | Pioneered special relativity (1905) and general relativity (1915) |
| Spaceflight (rocketry) | Robert Hutchings Goddard; Konstantin Tsiolkovsky; Hermann Oberth; Wernher von Braun | Goddard launched the first liquid-fueled rocket. Tsiolkovsky created the Tsiolkovsky rocket equation. Oberth was the first to present mathematically analyzed concepts and designs of space ships. Braun´s V2 rocket was the first man made object in space. He led the Apollo program. |
| Thermodynamics | Sadi Carnot (founder); Rudolf Clausius (one of the founding fathers) | Publication: On the Motive Power of Fire and Machines Fitted to Develop that Power (1824); Restated Carnot's principle known as the Carnot cycle and gave the theory of heat a truer and sounder basis. His most important paper, "On the Moving Force of Heat", published in 1850, first stated the second law of thermodynamics. In 1865 he introduced the concept of entropy. In 1870 he introduced the virial theorem, which applied to heat. |

== Formal sciences ==
=== Mathematics ===
| Field | Person/s considered "father" or "mother" | Rationale |
|---|---|---|
| Algebra (see also The father of algebra) | Muhammad Al-Khwarizmi (Algorismi); Diophantus | Full exposition of solving quadratic equations in his Al-Jabr and recognized algebra as an independent discipline. First use of symbolism (syncopation) in his Arithmetica, influenced Arabic development of algebra. |
| Algebraic topology | Henri Poincaré | Published Analysis Situs in 1895, introducing the concepts of homotopy and homology, which are now considered part of algebraic topology. |
| Analysis | Augustin-Louis Cauchy; Karl Weierstrass | |
| Analytic geometry | René Descartes; Pierre de Fermat (founders) | For their independent invention of the Cartesian Coordinate System |
| Artificial intelligence | Alan Turing, Claude Shannon, John McCarthy, Allen Newell, Marvin Minsky, Herbert A. Simon, Nathaniel Rochester | For their numerous contributions to the field, such as Turing's 1950 paper on AI, or Shannon's 1950 paper on how to program a computer for chess. Also for either the organization of or participation in the famous 1956 Dartmouth workshop, the founding event of AI. |
| Calculus | Isaac Newton; Gottfried Leibniz | See Leibniz and Newton calculus controversy. |
| Computer science | Charles Babbage; Alan Turing | In the history of computer science Babbage is often regarded as one of the first pioneers of computing and Turing invented the principle of the modern computer and the stored program concept that almost all modern day computers use. |
| Computer programming | Ada Lovelace; Charles Babbage | Work on Charles Babbage's proposed mechanical general-purpose computer, the Analytical Engine |
| Cryptanalysis | Al-Kindi | Developed the first code breaking algorithm based on frequency analysis. He wrote a book entitled "Manuscript on Deciphering Cryptographic Messages", containing detailed discussions on statistics. |
| Cryptography (modern) | Claude Shannon | Wrote a revolutionary paper that was released in 1949, and did work during WWII |
| Descriptive geometry | Gaspard Monge (founder) | Developed a graphical protocol that creates three-dimensional virtual space on a two-dimensional plane |
| Fractal geometry | Benoit Mandelbrot | |
| Geometry | Euclid | Euclid's Elements deduced the principles of Euclidean geometry from a set of axioms. |
| Graph theory | Leonhard Euler | See Seven Bridges of Königsberg |
| Italian school of algebraic geometry | Corrado Segre | Publications and students developing algebraic geometry |
| Modern algebra | Emmy Noether; Emil Artin | Provided the first general definitions of a commutative ring, and suggested that topology be studied algebraically. Combined the structure theory of associative algebras and the representation theory of groups into a single arithmetic theory of modules and ideals in rings satisfying ascending chain conditions. |
| Non-Euclidean geometry | Carl Friedrich Gauss, János Bolyai, Nikolai Lobachevsky (founders) | Independent development of hyperbolic geometry in which Euclid's fifth postulate is not true |
| Number theory | Pythagoras | |
| Probability | Gerolamo Cardano; Pierre de Fermat; Blaise Pascal; Christiaan Huygens (founders) | Fermat and Pascal co-founded probability theory, about which Huygens wrote the first book |
| Projective geometry | Girard Desargues (founder) | By generalizing the use of vanishing points to include the case when these are infinitely far away |
| Set theory | Georg Cantor | |
| Statistics (modern) | Ronald A. Fisher | |
| Tensor calculus | Gregorio Ricci-Curbastro (founder) | Book: The Absolute Differential Calculus |
| Topology | Leonard Euler | Seven Bridges of Königsberg and Euler's polyhedron formula |
| Trigonometry | Hipparchus | Constructed the first trigonometric table. |
| Vector algebra, vector calculus | Willard Gibbs; Oliver Heaviside (founders) | For their development and use of vectors in algebra and calculus |
| Mathematical logic | Aristotle, George Boole, Augustus De Morgan | Aristotle’s logical works contain the earliest formal study of logic that we have. |

=== Systems theory ===
| Field | Person/s considered "father" or "mother" | Rationale |
|---|---|---|
| Chaos theory | Henri Poincaré; Mary Cartwright; Edward Lorenz | Poincaré's work on the three-body problem was the first discovered example of a chaotic dynamical system. Cartwright made the first mathematical analysis of dynamical systems with chaos. Lorenz introduced strange attractor notation. |
| Cybernetics | Norbert Wiener | Book Cybernetics: Or the Control and Communication in the Animal and the Machine. 1948. |
| Dynamic programming | Richard E. Bellman | |
| Fuzzy logic | Lotfi Asker Zadeh | |
| Information theory | Claude Shannon | Article: A Mathematical Theory of Communication (1948) |
| Robust control | George Zames | Small gain theorem and H infinity control. |
| Stability theory | Alexander Lyapunov | Lyapunov function |
| System dynamics | Jay Wright Forrester | Book: Industrial dynamics (1961) |

== Social sciences ==
| Field | Person/s considered "father" or "mother" | Rationale |
|---|---|---|
| Anthropology | Herodotus; Abū Rayhān al-Bīrūnī | |
| Bibliometrics | Paul Otlet | The term bibliométrie was first used by Paul Otlet in 1934 and defined as "the measurement of all aspects related to the publication and reading of books and documents". |
| Egyptology | Father Athanasius Kircher Jean-François Champollion | First to identify the phonetic importance of the hieroglyph, and he demonstrated Coptic as a vestige of early Egyptian, before the Rosetta Stone's discovery. Translated parts of the Rosetta Stone. |
| Ethnography | Gerhard Friedrich Müller (1705–1783) | Described and categorized clothing, religions and rituals of the Siberian ethnic groups. |
| Historiography | Thucydides | Thucydides has been dubbed the father of "scientific history" by those who accept his claims to have applied strict standards of impartiality and evidence-gathering and analysis of cause and effect, without reference to intervention by the deities, as outlined in his introduction to his work. |
| History | Herodotus (who also coined the term) | The first writer to apply a scientific method to historical events. |
| Indology | Al-Biruni | Wrote the Indica |
| International law | Alberico Gentili; Francisco de Vitoria; Hugo Grotius | Influential contributions to the theory of international law, war and human rights |
| Linguistics (early) | Panini | Wrote the first descriptive grammar (of Sanskrit) |
| Linguistics (modern) | Ferdinand de Saussure | |
| Media studies | Marshall McLuhan | Emphasized the importance of medium, and coined terms like "global village" and "the medium is the message" |
| Political science | Aristotle; Niccolò Machiavelli*; Thomas Hobbes** | Aristotle is called the father of political science largely because of his work entitled Politics. This treatise is divided into eight books, and deals with subjects such as citizenship, democracy, oligarchy and the ideal state. *Machiavelli is considered the 'modern father of political science' **Hobbes is considered the Father of Modern Political Philosophy for his postulation of the State of Nature in Leviathan. |
| Sociology | Ibn Khaldun; Adam Ferguson; Auguste Comte (who also coined the term); Marquis de Condorcet (founder) | Wrote the first sociological book, the Muqaddimah (Prolegomena). "Father of modern sociology" Introduced the scientific method into sociology. |

=== Economics ===
| Field | Person(s) considered "father" or "mother" | Rationale |
|---|---|---|
| Accounting and bookkeeping | Luca Pacioli (c. 1447–1517) | Establisher of accounting and the first person to publish a work on bookkeeping. |
| Economics (early) | Ibn Khaldun (1332–1406); Chanakya / Kautilya (375 – 283 BCE) | Publication: Muqaddimah (1370); Publication: Arthashastra (400 BCE – 200 CE) |
| Economics (modern) | Richard Cantillon (1680s – 1734); Anders Chydenius (1729–1803); Adam Smith (c. 1723–1790) | First specific treatise on economics.; The National Gain (1765), a pamphlet that included key ideas about free trade.; The Wealth of Nations (1776). |
| Evolutionary economics; Ecological economics; Thermoeconomics; bioeconomics | Nicholas Georgescu-Roegen (1906–1994) | The Entropy Law and the Economic Process (1971) |
| Macroeconomics | John Maynard Keynes (1883–1946) | Author of The General Theory of Employment, Interest and Money and groundbreaking economist, Keynes spearheaded a revolution in economic thinking. Prior to Keynes, the general consensus among economists was that the economy was self-fixing. During the Great Depression, when people began to realize that the economy would not fix itself, Keynes proposed that the government needed to intervene to combat excessive boom and bust. This idea was the largest influence in U.S. President Franklin D. Roosevelt's New Deal. |
| Mathematical economics | Daniel Bernoulli (1700–1782) | Forerunner of the Tableau économique. |
| Monetary economics | Nicole Oresme (c. 1322–1382); Irving Fisher (1867–1947); Milton Friedman (1912–2006) | Oresme's De Moneta.; "Irving Fisher [...] spent his career studying questions about money and the economy - how money affects interest rates, how money affects inflation, and the impact of money on overall economic activity. For this work, he is regarded as the father of monetary economics."; "[...] no less an authority than the University of Chicago's Milton Friedman, the father of monetary economics, [...]" |
| Microcredit | Muhammad Yunus (born 1940) | Founded Grameen Bank |
| Personnel economics | Edward Lazear (1948–2020) | Published the first paper in the field. |
| Family and consumer science | Ellen Swallow Richards (1842–1911) | Founded the American Association of Home Economics, currently the American Association of Family & Consumer Sciences. "Bringing science into the home, Richards hoped to '...attain the best physical, mental, and moral development' for the family, which she believed was the basic unit of civilization." |

==== Schools of thought ====
| Field | Person(s) considered "father" or "mother" | Rationale |
|---|---|---|
| Austrian School | Carl Menger (1840–1921) | |
| School of Salamanca | Francisco de Vitoria (c. 1483–1546) | Highly influential teacher and lecturer on commercial morality |

==== Theories ====
| Field | Person(s) considered "father" or "mother" | Rationale |
|---|---|---|
| Expectations theory | Thomas Cardinal Cajetan (1469–1534) | Recognised the effect of market expectations on the value of money |
| Modern portfolio theory | Harry Markowitz (1927–2023) | |
| Social choice theory | Kenneth Arrow (1921–2017) | Created the field with his 1951 book Social Choice and Individual Values. |
| Game theory | John von Neumann (1903–1957); Oskar Morgenstern (1902–1977); John Forbes Nash Jr. (1928–2015) | Von Neumann and Morgenstern created the field with their 1944 book Theory of Games and Economic Behavior.; Nash created the Nash equilibrium. |

== See also ==
- Founders of statistics
