= The Wealth of Nations =

1776 economics book by Adam Smith

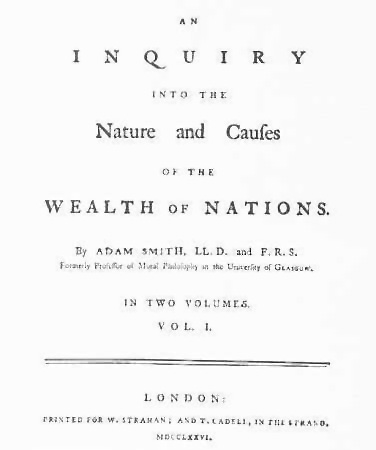
- Title-page of the 1776 London edition
- Author: Adam Smith
- Language: English
- Genre: Economics, philosophy
- Publisher: W. Strahan and T. Cadell, London
- Publication date: 9 March 1776
- Publication place: Scotland, Kingdom of Great Britain
- Text: The Wealth of Nations at Wikisource

An Inquiry into the Nature and Causes of the Wealth of Nations, usually referred to by its shortened title The Wealth of Nations, is a book by Scottish economist and moral philosopher Adam Smith. Published on 9 March 1776 as Smith's central intellectual project, the treatise sought to examine and explain the underlying political and economic principles by which commercial and industrial societies generate wealth. It has become a fundamental work in classical economics, and been described as "the first formulation of a comprehensive system of political economy". Smith radically transformed economic thought, laying the foundations for policies that would produce unprecedented increases in productivity and wealth.

By the eighteenth century, much of the emerging world economy was dominated by the feudal and mercantilist institutions of the European powers. In Europe itself, feudalism still shaped economic life through hereditary privilege, guilds, and restrictions on labour and commerce, while internationally, mercantilism sought to increase national wealth through state intervention, colonial trading monopolies, protective tariffs, and restrictions on international trade. A product of the ideas of the stadial conception of history, spontaneous order and the empiricism of the Scottish Enlightenment, the treatise attempted to illustrate the growing contradiction between the inherited institutions and assumptions of Europe's feudal and mercantilist economic order and the changing realities of an increasingly commercial and industrial society. Smith argued that these policies rested upon fundamentally mistaken political and economic conceptions among European political and economic elites, arguing that they inadvertently hindered rather than promoted the creation of wealth. He rejected the prevailing view that wealth was acquired through zero-sum competition between imperial states, instead arguing that the creation of wealth was enabled through free exchange and competition between individuals, and the increasing productivity made possible by the division of labour.

Smith employed the now famous metaphor of an "invisible hand", whereby he imagined that individuals within a free market were moved by the "invisible hand" force of supply and demand, rather than the 'heavy hand' of the state. And that by doing so, these self-interested individuals moved towards unintended positive consequences, namely community welfare in the form of national wealth. Smith wrote: "By pursuing his own interest he frequently promotes that of the society."

In the treatise, Smith not only critiqued the policies attributed to feudalism and mercantilism, but also other political and economic phenomena. He vehemently criticized slavery, rent-seeking by landed interests and landlords (for which he instead suggested a land value tax), primogeniture, entails, public debt, and military expenditure for imperialistic purposes.

Although The Wealth of Nations did not immediately transform policy, the book became one of the most influential books in modern history. The work represented a clear paradigm shift from the previous economic thought. Although Smith did not use the term "capitalism", the book fundamentally shaped the field of economics and provided the theoretical foundation for capitalism and economic policies that later prevailed in the 19th century. Karl Marx would later go on to write "...the Wealth of Nations is the true Bible of the classical political economy of the 18th century." The treatise is widely regarded as a foundational work of economic liberalism, with virtually all liberal economic schools embracing, reinterpretating or synthesizing Smith's concepts. Beyond the liberal tradition, Marxian economics developed as a critique of the tradition of classical political economy established in The Wealth of Nations, while adapting many of Smith's analytical concepts, such as the division of labour, economic classes, the labour theory of value, capital accumulation, the hypothesis of the tendency of the rate of profit to fall, and the distinction between wages, profit, and rent.

== History ==
The Wealth of Nations was published in two volumes on 9 March 1776 (with books I–III included in the first volume and books IV and V included in the second), during the Scottish Enlightenment and the Scottish Agricultural Revolution. It influenced several authors and economists, such as Karl Marx, as well as governments and organizations, setting the terms for economic debate and discussion for the next century and a half. For example, Alexander Hamilton was influenced in part by The Wealth of Nations to write his Report on Manufactures, in which he argued against many of Smith's policies. Hamilton based much of this report on the ideas of Jean-Baptiste Colbert, and it was, in part, Colbert's ideas that Smith responded to, and criticised, with The Wealth of Nations.

The Wealth of Nations was the product of seventeen years of notes and earlier studies, as well as an observation of conversation among economists of the time (like Nicholas Magens) concerning economic and societal conditions during the beginning of the Industrial Revolution, and it took Smith some ten years to produce. The result was a treatise which sought to offer a practical application for reformed economic theory to replace the mercantilist and physiocratic economic theories that were becoming less relevant in the time of industrial progress and innovation. It provided the foundation for economists, politicians, mathematicians, and thinkers of all fields to build upon. Irrespective of historical influence, The Wealth of Nations represented a clear paradigm shift in the field of economics, comparable to what Immanuel Kant's Critique of Pure Reason was for philosophy.

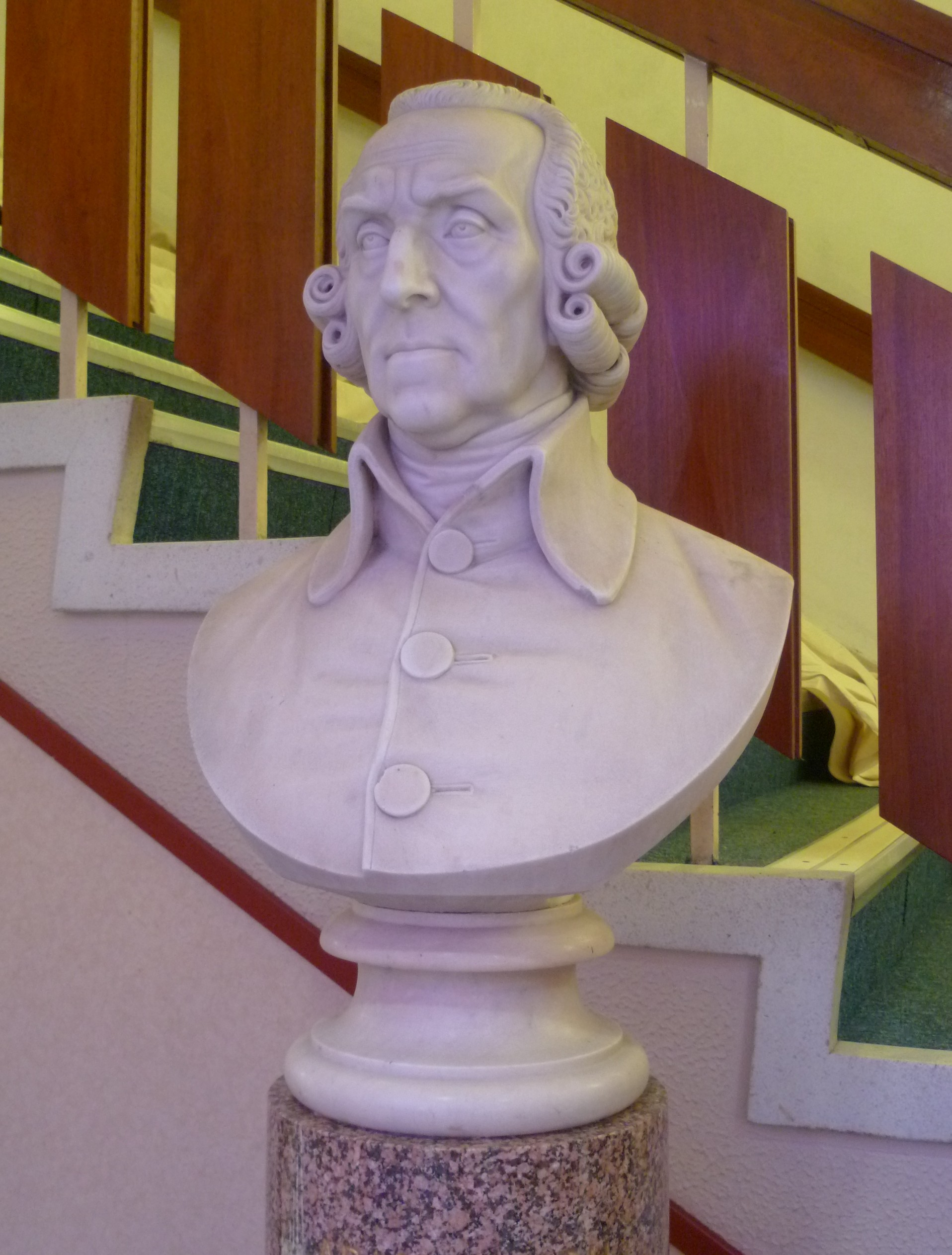
Bust of Smith in the Adam Smith Theatre, Kirkcaldy

Five editions of The Wealth of Nations were published during Smith's lifetime: in 1776, 1778, 1784, 1786 and 1789. Numerous editions appeared after Smith's death in 1790. To better understand the evolution of the work under Smith's hand, a team led by Edwin Cannan collated the first five editions. The differences were published along with an edited sixth edition in 1904. They found minor but numerous differences (including the addition of many footnotes) between the first and the second editions; the differences between the second and third editions are major. In 1784, Smith annexed these first two editions with the publication of Additions and Corrections to the First and Second Editions of Dr. Adam Smith's Inquiry into the Nature and Causes of the Wealth of Nations, and he also had published the three-volume third edition of the Wealth of Nations, which incorporated Additions and Corrections and, for the first time, an index. Among other things, the Additions and Corrections included entirely new sections, particularly to book 4, chapters 4 and 5, and to book 5, chapter 1, as well as an additional chapter (8), "Conclusion of the Mercantile System", in book 4.

The fourth edition, published in 1786, had only slight differences from the third edition, and Smith himself says in the Advertisement at the beginning of the book, "I have made no alterations of any kind." Finally, Cannan notes only trivial differences between the fourth and fifth editions—a set of misprints being removed from the fourth and a different set of misprints being introduced.

== Synopsis ==
=== Book I: Of the Causes of Improvement in the productive Powers of Labour ===
Of the Division of Labour: Division of labour has caused a greater increase in production than any other factor. This diversification is greatest for nations with more industry and improvement, and is responsible for "universal opulence" in those countries. This is in part due to increased quality of production, but more importantly because of increased efficiency of production, leading to a higher nominal output of units produced per time unit. Agriculture is less amenable than manufacturing to division of labour; hence, rich nations are not so far ahead of poor nations in agriculture as in manufacturing.

Of the Principle which gives Occasion to the Division of Labour: Division of labour arises not from innate wisdom, but from humans' propensity to barter.

That the Division of Labour is Limited by the Extent of the Market: Limited opportunity for exchange discourages division of labour. Because "water-carriage" (i.e. transportation) extends the market, division of labour, with its improvements, comes earliest to cities near waterways. Civilization began around the highly navigable Mediterranean Sea.

Of the Origin and Use of Money: With division of labour, the produce of one's own labour can fill only a small part of one's needs. Different commodities have served as a common medium of exchange, but all nations have finally settled on metals, which are durable and divisible, for this purpose. Before coinage, people had to weigh and assay with each exchange, or risk "the grossest frauds and impositions." Thus nations began stamping metal, on one side only, to ascertain purity, or on all sides, to stipulate purity and amount. The quantity of real metal in coins has diminished, due to the "avarice and injustice of princes and sovereign states," enabling them to pay their debts in appearance only, and to the defraudment of creditors.

Of the Wages of Labour: In this section, Smith describes how the wages of labour are dictated primarily by the competition among labourers and masters. When labourers bid against one another for limited employment opportunities, the wages of labour collectively fall, whereas when employers compete against one another for limited supplies of labour, the wages of labour collectively rise. However, this process of competition is often circumvented by combinations among labourers and among masters.

Smith himself wrote about the "severity" of such laws against worker actions, and made a point to contrast the "clamour" of the "masters" against workers' associations, while associations and collusions of the masters "are never heard by the people" though such actions are "always" and "everywhere" taking place:

We rarely hear, it has been said, of the combinations of masters, though frequently of those of workmen. But whoever imagines, upon this account, that masters rarely combine, is as ignorant of the world as of the subject. Masters are always and everywhere in a sort of tacit, but constant and uniform, combination, not to raise the wages of labour above their actual rate [...] Masters, too, sometimes enter into particular combinations to sink the wages of labour even below this rate. These are always conducted with the utmost silence and secrecy till the moment of execution; and when the workmen yield, as they sometimes do without resistance, though severely felt by them, they are never heard of by other people". In contrast, when workers combine, "the masters [...] never cease to call aloud for the assistance of the civil magistrate, and the rigorous execution of those laws which have been enacted with so much severity against the combination of servants, labourers, and journeymen.

In societies where the amount of labour exceeds the amount of revenue available for waged labour, competition among workers is greater than the competition among employers, and wages fall. Conversely, where revenue is abundant, labour wages rise. Smith argues that, therefore, labour wages only rise as a result of greater revenue disposed to pay for labour. Smith thought of labour as being like any other commodity in this respect:

the demand for men, like that for any other commodity, necessarily regulates the production of men; quickens it when it goes on too slowly, and stops it when it advances too fast. It is this demand which regulates and determines the state of propagation in all the different countries of the world, in North America, in Europe, and in China; which renders it rapidly progressive in the first, slow and gradual in the second, and altogether stationary in the last.

However, the amount of revenue must increase constantly in proportion to the amount of labour for wages to remain high. Smith illustrates this by juxtaposing England with the North American colonies. In England, there is more revenue than in the colonies, but wages are lower, because more workers flock to new employment opportunities caused by the large amount of revenue – so workers eventually compete against each other as much as they did before. By contrast, as capital continues to flow to the colonial economies at least at the same rate that population increases to "fill out" this excess capital, wages there stay higher than in England.

Smith was highly concerned about the problems of poverty. He writes:

poverty, though it does not prevent the generation, is extremely unfavourable to the rearing of children [...] It is not uncommon [...] in the Highlands of Scotland for a mother who has borne twenty children not to have two alive [...] In some places one half the children born die before they are four years of age; in many places before they are seven; and in almost all places before they are nine or ten. This great mortality, however, will every where be found chiefly among the children of the common people, who cannot afford to tend them with the same care as those of better station.

The only way to determine whether a man is rich or poor is to examine the amount of labour he can afford to purchase. "Labour is the real exchange for commodities".

Smith also describes the relation of cheap years and the production of manufactures versus the production in dear years. He argues that while some examples, such as the linen production in France, show a correlation, another example in Scotland shows the opposite. He concludes that there are too many variables to make any statement about this.

Of the Profits of Stock: In this chapter, Smith uses interest rates as an indicator of the profits of stock. This is because interest can only be paid with the profits of stock, and so creditors will be able to raise rates in proportion to the increase or decrease of the profits of their debtors.

Smith argues that the profits of stock are inversely proportional to the wages of labour, because as more money is spent compensating labour, there is less remaining for personal profit. It follows that, in societies where competition among labourers is greatest relative to competition among employers, profits will be much higher. Smith illustrates this by comparing interest rates in England and Scotland. In England, government laws against usury had kept maximum interest rates very low, but even the maximum rate was believed to be higher than the rate at which money was usually loaned. In Scotland, however, interest rates are much higher. This is the result of a greater proportion of capitalists in England, which offsets some competition among labourers and raises wages.

However, Smith notes that, curiously, interest rates in the colonies are also remarkably high (recall that, in the previous chapter, Smith described how wages in the colonies are higher than in England). Smith attributes this to the fact that, when an empire takes control of a colony, prices for a huge abundance of land and resources are extremely cheap. This allows capitalists to increase their profits, but simultaneously draws many capitalists to the colonies, increasing the wages of labour. As this is done, however, the profits of stock in the mother country rise (or at least cease to fall), as much of it has already flocked offshore.

Of Wages and Profit in the Different Employments of Labour and Stock: Smith repeatedly attacks groups of politically aligned individuals who attempt to use their collective influence to manipulate the government into doing their bidding. At the time, these were referred to as "factions", but are now more commonly called "special interests", a term that can comprise international bankers, corporate conglomerations, outright oligopolies, trade unions and other groups. Indeed, Smith had a particular distrust of the tradesman class. He felt that the members of this class, especially acting together within the guilds they want to form, could constitute a power block and manipulate the state into regulating for special interests against the general interest:

People of the same trade seldom meet together, even for merriment and diversion, but the conversation ends in a conspiracy against the public, or in some contrivance to raise prices. It is impossible indeed to prevent such meetings, by any law which either could be executed, or would be consistent with liberty and justice. But though the law cannot hinder people of the same trade from sometimes assembling together, it ought to do nothing to facilitate such assemblies; much less to render them necessary.

Smith also argues against government subsidies of certain trades, because this will draw many more people to the trade than what would otherwise be normal, collectively lowering their wages.

Of the Rent of the Land: Chapter 10, part ii, motivates an understanding of the idea of feudalism. Rent, considered as the price paid for the use of land, is naturally the highest the tenant can afford in the actual circumstances of the land. In adjusting lease terms, the landlord endeavours to leave him no greater share of the produce than what is sufficient to keep up the stock from which he furnishes the seed, pays the labour, and purchases and maintains the cattle and other instruments of husbandry, together with the ordinary profits of farming stock in the neighbourhood.

This is evidently the smallest share with which the tenant can content himself without being a loser, and the landlord seldom means to leave him any more. Whatever part of the produce, or, what is the same thing, whatever part of its price, is over and above this share, he naturally endeavours to reserve to himself as the rent of his land, which is evidently the highest the tenant can afford to pay in the actual circumstances of the land. Sometimes, indeed, the liberality, more frequently the ignorance, of the landlord, makes him accept of somewhat less than this portion; and sometimes too, though more rarely, the ignorance of the tenant makes him undertake to pay somewhat more, or to content himself with somewhat less, than the ordinary profits of farming stock in the neighbourhood. This portion, however, may still be considered as the natural rent of land, or the rent for which it is naturally meant that land should for the most part be let.

=== Book II: Of the Nature, Accumulation, and Employment of Stock ===
Of the Division of Stock:

When the stock which a man possesses is no more than sufficient to maintain him for a few days or a few weeks, he seldom thinks of deriving any revenue from it. He consumes it as sparingly as he can, and endeavours by his labour to acquire something which may supply its place before it is consumed altogether. His revenue is, in this case, derived from his labour only. This is the state of the greater part of the labouring poor in all countries. But when he possesses stock sufficient to maintain him for months or years, he naturally endeavours to derive a revenue from the greater part of it; reserving only so much for his immediate consumption as may maintain him till this revenue begins to come in. His whole stock, therefore, is distinguished into two parts. That part which, he expects, is to afford him this revenue, is called his capital.

Of Money Considered as a particular Branch of the General Stock of the Society:

From references of the first book, that the price of the greater part of commodities resolves itself into three parts, of which one pays the wages of the labour, another the profits of the stock, and a third the rent of the land which had been employed in producing and bringing them to market: that there are, indeed, some commodities of which the price is made up of two of those parts only, the wages of labour, and the profits of stock: and a very few in which it consists altogether in one, the wages of labour: but that the price of every commodity necessarily resolves itself into some one, or other, or all of these three parts; every part of it which goes neither to rent nor to wages, being necessarily profit to somebody.

Of the Accumulation of Capital, or of Productive and Unproductive Labour:

One sort of labour adds to the value of the subject upon which it is bestowed: there is another which has no such effect. The former, as it produces a value, may be called productive; the latter, unproductive labour. Thus the labour of a manufacturer adds, generally, to the value of the materials which he works upon, that of his own maintenance, and of his master's profit. The labour of a menial servant, on the contrary, adds to the value of nothing.

Of Stock Lent at Interest:

The stock which is lent at interest is always considered as a capital by the lender. He expects that in due time it is to be restored to him, and that in the meantime the borrower is to pay him a certain annual rent for the use of it. The borrower may use it either as a capital, or as a stock reserved for immediate consumption. If he uses it as a capital, he employs it in the maintenance of productive labourers, who reproduce the value with a profit. He can, in this case, both restore the capital and pay the interest without alienating or encroaching upon any other source of revenue. If he uses it as a stock reserved for immediate consumption, he acts the part of a prodigal, and dissipates in the maintenance of the idle what was destined for the support of the industrious. He can, in this case, neither restore the capital nor pay the interest without either alienating or encroaching upon some other source of revenue, such as the property or the rent of land. The stock which is lent at interest is, no doubt, occasionally employed in both these ways, but in the former much more frequently than in the latter.

Of the different employment of Capital:

A capital may be employed in four different ways; either, first, in procuring the rude produce annually required for the use and consumption of the society; or, secondly, in manufacturing and preparing that rude produce for immediate use and consumption; or, thirdly in transporting either the rude or manufactured produce from the places where they abound to those where they are wanted; or, lastly, in dividing particular portions of either into such small parcels as suit the occasional demands of those who want them.

=== Book III: Of the different Progress of Opulence in different Nations ===
==== Long-term economic growth ====
Adam Smith uses this example to address long-term economic growth. Smith states, "As subsistence is, in the nature of things, prior to conveniency and luxury, so the industry which procures the former, must necessarily be prior to that which ministers to the latter". In order for industrial success, subsistence is required first from the countryside. Industry and trade occur in cities while agriculture occurs in the countryside.

==== Agricultural jobs ====
Agricultural work is a more desirable situation than industrial work because the owner is in complete control. Smith states that:

In our North American colonies, where uncultivated land is still to be had upon easy terms, no manufactures for distant sale have ever yet been established in any of their towns. When an artificer has acquired a little more stock than is necessary for carrying on his own business in supplying the neighbouring country, he does not, in North America, attempt to establish with it a manufacture for more distant sale, but employs it in the purchase and improvement of uncultivated land. From artificer he becomes planter, and neither the large wages nor the easy subsistence which that country affords to artificers, can bribe him rather to work for other people than for himself. He feels that an artificer is the servant of his customers, from whom he derives his subsistence; but that a planter who cultivates his own land, and derives his necessary subsistence from the labour of his own family, is really a master, and independent of all the world.

Where there is open countryside agriculture is much preferable to industrial occupations and ownership.

Adam Smith goes on to say "According to the natural course of things, therefore, the greater part of the capital of every growing society is, first, directed to agriculture, afterwards to manufactures, and last of all to foreign commerce". This sequence leads to growth, and therefore opulence.

The great commerce of every civilised society is that carried on between the inhabitants of the town and those of the country. It consists in the exchange of crude for manufactured produce, either immediately, or by the intervention of money, or of some sort of paper which represents money. The country supplies the town with the means of subsistence and the materials of manufacture. The town repays this supply by sending back a part of the manufactured produce to the inhabitants of the country. The town, in which there neither is nor can be any reproduction of substances, may very properly be said to gain its whole wealth and subsistence from the country. We must not, however, upon this account, imagine that the gain of the town is the loss of the country. The gains of both are mutual and reciprocal, and the division of labour is in this, as in all other cases, advantageous to all the different persons employed in the various occupations into which it is subdivided.

Of the Discouragement of Agriculture: Chapter 2's long title is "Of the Discouragement of Agriculture in the Ancient State of Europe after the Fall of the Roman Empire".

When the German and Scythian nations overran the western provinces of the Roman empire, the confusions which followed so great a revolution lasted for several centuries. The rapine and violence which the barbarians exercised against the ancient inhabitants interrupted the commerce between the towns and the country. The towns were deserted, and the country was left uncultivated, and the western provinces of Europe, which had enjoyed a considerable degree of opulence under the Roman empire, sunk into the lowest state of poverty and barbarism. During the continuance of those confusions, the chiefs and principal leaders of those nations acquired or usurped to themselves the greater part of the lands of those countries. A great part of them was uncultivated; but no part of them, whether cultivated or uncultivated, was left without a proprietor. All of them were engrossed, and the greater part by a few great proprietors. This original engrossing of uncultivated lands, though a great, might have been but a transitory evil. They might soon have been divided again, and broke into small parcels either by succession or by alienation. The law of primogeniture hindered them from being divided by succession: the introduction of entails prevented their being broke into small parcels by alienation.

Of the Rise and Progress of Cities and Towns, after the Fall of the Roman Empire:

The inhabitants of cities and towns were, after the fall of the Roman empire, not more favoured than those of the country. They consisted, indeed, of a very different order of people from the first inhabitants of the ancient republics of Greece and Italy. These last were composed chiefly of the proprietors of lands, among whom the public territory was originally divided, and who found it convenient to build their houses in the neighbourhood of one another, and to surround them with a wall, for the sake of common defence. After the fall of the Roman empire, on the contrary, the proprietors of land seem generally to have lived in fortified castles on their own estates, and in the midst of their own tenants and dependants. The towns were chiefly inhabited by tradesmen and mechanics, who seem in those days to have been of servile, or very nearly of servile condition. The privileges which we find granted by ancient charters to the inhabitants of some of the principal towns in Europe sufficiently show what they were before those grants. The people to whom it is granted as a privilege that they might give away their own daughters in marriage without the consent of their lord, that upon their death their own children, and not their lord, should succeed to their goods, and that they might dispose of their own effects by will, must, before those grants, have been either altogether or very nearly in the same state of villanage with the occupiers of land in the country.

How the Commerce of the Towns Contributed to the Improvement of the Country: Smith often harshly criticised those who act purely out of self-interest and greed, and warns that,

...[a]ll for ourselves, and nothing for other people, seems, in every age of the world, to have been the vile maxim of the masters of mankind.

=== Book IV: Of Systems of political Economy ===
Smith vigorously attacked the antiquated government restrictions he thought hindered industrial expansion. In fact, he attacked most forms of government interference in the economic process, including tariffs, arguing that this creates inefficiency and high prices in the long run. It is believed that Smith's theory influenced government legislation in later years, especially during the 19th century.

Smith advocated a government that was active in sectors other than the economy. He advocated public education for poor adults, a judiciary, and a standing army—institutional systems not directly profitable for private industries.

Of the Principle of the Commercial or Mercantile System: The book has sometimes been described as a critique of mercantilism and a synthesis of the emerging economic thinking of Smith's time. Specifically, The Wealth of Nations attacks, inter alia, two major tenets of mercantilism:

1. The idea that protectionist tariffs serve the economic interests of a nation (or indeed any purpose whatsoever) and
2. The idea that large reserves of gold bullion or other precious metals are necessary for a country's economic success. This critique of mercantilism was later used by David Ricardo when he laid out his Theory of Comparative Advantage.

Of Restraints upon the Importation: Chapter 2's full title is "Of Restraints upon the Importation from Foreign Countries of such Goods as can be Produced at Home". The "invisible hand" is a frequently referenced theme from the book, although it is specifically mentioned only once.

As every individual, therefore, endeavours as much as he can both to employ his capital in the support of domestic industry, and so to direct that industry that its produce may be of the greatest value; every individual necessarily labours to render the annual revenue of the society as great as he can. He generally, indeed, neither intends to promote the public interest, nor knows how much he is promoting it. By preferring the support of domestic to that of foreign industry, he intends only his own security; and by directing that industry in such a manner as its produce may be of the greatest value, he intends only his own gain, and he is in this, as in many other cases, led by an invisible hand to promote an end which was no part of his intention. Nor is it always the worse for the society that it was no part of it. By pursuing his own interest he frequently promotes that of the society more effectually than when he really intends to promote it. (Book 4, Chapter 2)

The metaphor of the "invisible hand" has been widely used out of context. In the passage above Smith is referring to "the support of domestic industry" and contrasting that support with the importation of goods. Neoclassical economic theory has expanded the metaphor beyond the domestic/foreign manufacture argument to encompass nearly all aspects of economics.

Of the extraordinary Restraints: Chapter 3's long title is "Of the extraordinary Restraints upon the Importation of Goods of almost all Kinds, from those Countries with which the Balance is supposed to be Disadvantageous".

Of Drawbacks: Merchants and manufacturers are not contented with the monopoly of the home market, but desire likewise the most extensive foreign sale for their goods. Their country has no jurisdiction in foreign nations, and therefore can seldom procure them any monopoly there. They are generally obliged, therefore, to content themselves with petitioning for certain encouragements to exportation.

Of these encouragements what are called Drawbacks seem to be the most reasonable. To allow the merchant to draw back upon exportation, either the whole or a part of whatever excise or inland duty is imposed upon domestic industry, can never occasion the exportation of a greater quantity of goods than what would have been exported had no duty been imposed. Such encouragements do not tend to turn towards any particular employment a greater share of the capital of the country than what would go to that employment of its own accord, but only to hinder the duty from driving away any part of that shares to other employments.

Of Bounties: Bounties upon exportation are, in Great Britain, frequently petitioned for, and sometimes granted to the produce of particular branches of domestic industry. By means of them our merchants and manufacturers, it is pretended, will be enabled to sell their goods as cheap, or cheaper than their rivals in the foreign market. A greater quantity, it is said, will thus be exported, and the balance of trade consequently turned more in favour of our own country. We cannot give our workmen a monopoly in the foreign as we have done in the home market. We cannot force foreigners to buy their goods as we have done our own countrymen. The next best expedient, it has been thought, therefore, is to pay them for buying. It is in this manner that the mercantile system proposes to enrich the whole country, and to put money into all our pockets by means of the balance of trade.

Of Treaties of Commerce:

When a nation binds itself by treaty either to permit the entry of certain goods from one foreign country which it prohibits from all others, or to exempt the goods of one country from duties to which it subjects those of all others, the country, or at least the merchants and manufacturers of the country, whose commerce is so favoured, must necessarily derive great advantage from the treaty. Those merchants and manufacturers enjoy a sort of monopoly in the country which is so indulgent to them. That country becomes a market both more extensive and more advantageous for their goods: more extensive, because the goods of other nations being either excluded or subjected to heavier duties, it takes off a greater quantity of theirs: more advantageous, because the merchants of the favoured country, enjoying a sort of monopoly there, will often sell their goods for a better price than if exposed to the free competition of all other nations. Such treaties, however, though they may be advantageous to the merchants and manufacturers of the favoured, are necessarily disadvantageous to those of the favouring country. A monopoly is thus granted against them to a foreign nation; and they must frequently buy the foreign goods they have occasion for dearer than if the free competition of other nations was admitted.

Of Colonies:

Of the Motives for establishing new Colonies:

The interest which occasioned the first settlement of the different European colonies in America and the West Indies was not altogether so plain and distinct as that which directed the establishment of those of ancient Greece and Rome. All the different states of ancient Greece possessed, each of them, but a very small territory, and when the people in any one of them multiplied beyond what that territory could easily maintain, a part of them were sent in quest of a new habitation in some remote and distant part of the world; warlike neighbours surrounded them on all sides, rendering it difficult for any of them to enlarge their territory at home. The colonies of the Dorians resorted chiefly to Italy and Sicily, which, in the times preceding the foundation of Rome, were inhabited by barbarous and uncivilised nations: those of the Ionians and Eolians, the two other great tribes of the Greeks, to Asia Minor and the islands of the Aegean Sea, of which the inhabitants seem at that time to have been pretty much in the same state as those of Sicily and Italy. The mother city, though she considered the colony as a child, at all times entitled to great favour and assistance, and owing in return much gratitude and respect, yet considered it as an emancipated child over whom she pretended to claim no direct authority or jurisdiction. The colony settled its own form of government, enacted its own laws, elected its own magistrates, and made peace or war with its neighbours as an independent state, which had no occasion to wait for the approbation or consent of the mother city. Nothing can be more plain and distinct than the interest which directed every such establishment.

Causes of Prosperity of new Colonies:

The colony of a civilised nation which takes possession either of a waste country, or of one so thinly inhabited that the natives easily give place to the new settlers, advances more rapidly to wealth and greatness than any other human society. The colonists carry out with them a knowledge of agriculture and of other useful arts superior to what can grow up of its own accord in the course of many centuries among savage and barbarous nations. They carry out with them, too, the habit of subordination, some notion of the regular government which takes place in their own country, of the system of laws which supports it, and of a regular administration of justice; and they naturally establish something of the same kind in the new settlement.

Of the Advantages which Europe has derived from the Discovery of America, and from that of a Passage to the East Indies by the Cape of Good Hope:

Such are the advantages which the colonies of America have derived from the policy of Europe. What are those which Europe has derived from the discovery and colonisation of America? Those advantages may be divided, first, into the general advantages which Europe, considered as one great country, has derived from those great events; and, secondly, into the particular advantages which each colonising country has derived from the colonies which particularly belong to it, in consequence of the authority or dominion which it exercises over them.

The general advantages which Europe, considered as one great country, has derived from the discovery and colonisation of America, consist, first, in the increase of its enjoyments; and, secondly, in the augmentation of its industry.

The surplus produce of America, imported into Europe, furnishes the inhabitants of this great continent with a variety of commodities which they could not otherwise have possessed; some for conveniency and use, some for pleasure, and some for ornament, and thereby contributes to increase their enjoyments.

Conclusion of the Mercantile System: Smith's argument about the international political economy opposed the idea of mercantilism. While the Mercantile System encouraged each country to hoard gold, while trying to grasp hegemony, Smith argued that free trade eventually makes all actors better off. This argument is the modern 'Free Trade' argument.

Of the Agricultural Systems: Chapter 9's long title is "Of the Agricultural Systems, or of those Systems of Political Economy, which Represent the Produce of Land, as either the Sole or the Principal, Source of the Revenue and Wealth of Every Country".

That system which represents the produce of land as the sole source of the revenue and wealth of every country has, so far as by that time, never been adopted by any nation, and it at present exists only in the speculations of a few men of great learning and ingenuity in France. It would not, surely, be worthwhile to examine at great length the errors of a system which never has done, and probably never will do, any harm in any part of the world.

=== Book V: Of the Revenue of the Sovereign or Commonwealth ===
Smith postulated four "maxims" of taxation: proportionality, transparency, convenience, and efficiency. Some economists interpret Smith's opposition to taxes on transfers of money, such as the Stamp Act, as opposition to capital gains taxes, which did not exist in the 18th century. Other economists credit Smith as one of the first to advocate a progressive tax. Smith wrote, "The necessaries of life occasion the great expense of the poor. They find it difficult to get food, and the greater part of their little revenue is spent in getting it. The luxuries and vanities of life occasion the principal expense of the rich, and a magnificent house embellishes and sets off to the best advantage all the other luxuries and vanities which they possess. A tax upon house-rents, therefore, would in general fall heaviest upon the rich; and in this sort of inequality there would not, perhaps, be anything very unreasonable. It is not very unreasonable that the rich should contribute to the public expense, not only in proportion to their revenue, but something more than in that proportion." Smith believed that an even "more proper" source of progressive taxation than property taxes was ground rent. Smith wrote that "nothing [could] be more reasonable" than a land value tax.

Of the Expenses of the Sovereign or Commonwealth: Smith uses this chapter to comment on the concept of taxation and expenditure by the state. On taxation, Smith wrote,

The subjects of every state ought to contribute towards the support of the government, as nearly as possible, in proportion to their respective abilities; that is, in proportion to the revenue which they respectively enjoy under the protection of the state. The expense of government to the individuals of a great nation is like the expense of management to the joint tenants of a great estate, who are all obliged to contribute in proportion to their respective interests in the estate. In the observation or neglect of this maxim consists what is called the equality or inequality of taxation.

Smith advocates a tax naturally attached to the "abilities" and habits of each echelon of society.

For the lower echelon, Smith recognised the intellectually erosive effect that the otherwise beneficial division of labour can have on workers, what Marx, though he mainly opposes Smith, later named "alienation"; therefore, Smith warns of the consequence of government failing to fulfill its proper role, which is to preserve against the innate tendency of human society to fall apart.

..."the understandings of the greater part of men are necessarily formed by their ordinary employments. The man whose whole life is spent in performing a few simple operations, of which the effects are perhaps always the same, or very nearly the same, has no occasion to exert his understanding or to exercise his invention in finding out expedients for removing difficulties which never occur. He naturally loses, therefore, the habit of such exertion, and generally becomes as stupid and ignorant as it is possible for a human creature to become. The torpor of his mind renders him not only incapable of relishing or bearing a part in any rational conversation, but of conceiving any generous, noble, or tender sentiment, and consequently of forming any just judgment concerning many even of the ordinary duties of private life... But in every improved and civilized society this is the state into which the labouring poor, that is, the great body of the people, must necessarily fall, unless government takes some pains to prevent it."

Under Smith's model, government involvement in any area other than those stated above negatively impacts economic growth. This is because economic growth is determined by the needs of a free market and the entrepreneurial nature of private persons. A shortage of a product makes its price rise, and so stimulates producers to produce more and attracts new people to that line of production. An excess supply of a product (more of the product than people are willing to buy) drives prices down, and producers refocus energy and money to other areas where there is a need.

Of the Sources of the General or Public Revenue of the Society: In his discussion of taxes in Book Five, Smith wrote:

The necessaries of life occasion the great expense of the poor. They find it difficult to get food, and the greater part of their little revenue is spent in getting it. The luxuries and vanities of life occasion the principal expense of the rich, and a magnificent house embellishes and sets off to the best advantage all the other luxuries and vanities which they possess. A tax upon house-rents, therefore, would in general fall heaviest upon the rich; and in this sort of inequality there would not, perhaps, be anything very unreasonable. It is not very unreasonable that the rich should contribute to the public expense, not only in proportion to their revenue, but something more than in that proportion.

He also introduced the distinction between a direct tax, and by implication an indirect tax (although he did not use the word "indirect"):

Capitation taxes, so far as they are levied upon the lower ranks of people, are direct taxes upon the wages of labour, and are attended with all the inconveniences of such taxes.

And further:

It is thus that a tax upon the necessaries of life operates exactly in the same manner as a direct tax upon the wages of labour.

This term was later used in United States, Article I, Section 2, Clause 3 of the U.S. Constitution, and James Madison, who wrote much of the Constitution, is known to have read Smith's book.

Of War and Public Debts:

...when war comes [politicians] are both unwilling and unable to increase their [tax] revenue in proportion to the increase of their expense. They are unwilling for fear of offending the people, who, by so great and so sudden an increase of taxes, would soon be disgusted with the war [...] The facility of borrowing delivers them from the embarrassment [...] By means of borrowing they are enabled, with a very moderate increase of taxes, to raise, from year to year, money sufficient for carrying on the war, and by the practice of perpetually funding they are enabled, with the smallest possible increase of taxes [to pay the interest on the debt], to raise annually the largest possible sum of money [to fund the war]. ...The return of peace, indeed, seldom relieves them from the greater part of the taxes imposed during the war. These are mortgaged for the interest of the debt contracted in order to carry it on.

Smith then goes on to say that even if money was set aside from future revenues to pay for the debts of war, it seldom actually gets used to pay down the debt. Politicians are inclined to spend the money on some other scheme that will win the favour of their constituents. Hence, interest payments rise and war debts continue to grow larger, well beyond the end of the war.

Summing up, if governments can borrow without check, then they are more likely to wage war without check, and the costs of the war spending will burden future generations, since war debts are almost never repaid by the generations that incurred them.

== Reception and impact ==
=== Greater Britain ===
==== Intellectuals, critics, and reviewers ====
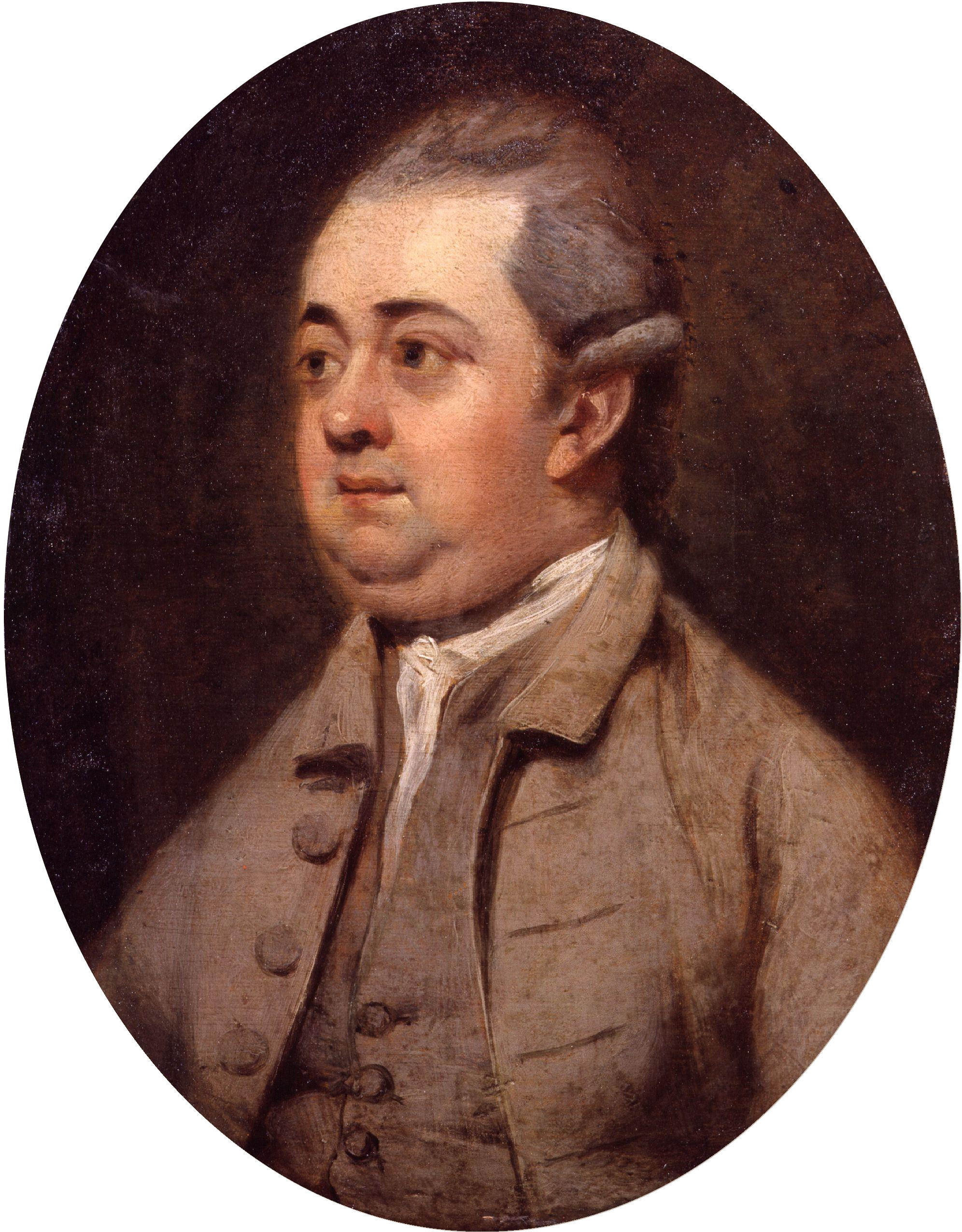
Edward Gibbon praised The Wealth of Nations.

The first edition of the book sold out in six months. The printer William Strahan wrote on 12 April 1776 that David Hume said The Wealth of Nations required too much thought to be as popular as Edward Gibbon's The History of the Decline and Fall of the Roman Empire. Strahan also wrote: "What you say of Mr. Gibbon's and Dr. Smith's book is exactly just. The former is the most popular work; but the sale of the latter, though not near so rapid, has been more than I could have expected from a work that requires much thought and reflection (qualities that do not abound among modern readers) to peruse to any purpose." Gibbon wrote to Adam Ferguson on 1 April: "What an excellent work is that with which our common friend Mr. Adam Smith has enriched the public! An extensive science in a single book, and the most profound ideas expressed in the most perspicuous language". The review of the book in the Annual Register was probably written by Whig MP Edmund Burke. In 1791, the English-born radical Thomas Paine wrote in his Rights of Man that "Had Mr. Burke possessed talents similar to the author 'On the Wealth of Nations,' he would have comprehended all the parts which enter into, and, by assemblage, form a constitution."

One of the earliest published extended criticisms of Adam Smith's economic theory came in an unlikely medium: footnotes to the introduction to a translation of Luís de Camões's The Lusiads, the Portuguese epic poem of 1572 about the discovery by Europeans of a sea route to Asia, by Scottish poet William Julius Mickle. In the introduction to the first edition, 1776, Mickle described the poem as "the Epic Poem of the Birth of Commerce", having direct interest to contemporary discussions of "the true spirit of commerce"; the second edition, published 1778, featured an expanded introduction in which Mickle launched a violent attack on Smith and his laissez-faire doctrines as applied to the East India Company issue, as opposed to Mickle's views of an ideal Christian, righteous, and naturally superior empire. Mickle's dislike of Smith appears to have been political but personal as well: he believed that Smith had advised his former pupil, the Duke of Buccleuch, against becoming the patron of the first edition of The Lusiads.

In 1800, the Anti-Jacobin Review criticized The Wealth of Nations. In 1803, The Times argued against war with Spain:

She is our best customer; and by the gentle and peaceable stream of commerce, the treasures of the new world flow with greater certainty into English reservoirs, than it could do by the most successful warfare. They come in this way to support our manufactures, to encourage industry, to feed our poor, to pay taxes, to reward ingenuity, to diffuse riches among all classes of people. But for the full understanding of this beneficial circulation of wealth, we must refer to Dr. Adam Smith's incomparable Treatise on the Wealth of Nations.

In 1810, a correspondent writing under the pseudonym of Publicola included at the head of his letter Smith's line that "Exclusive Companies are nuisances in every respect" and called him "that learned writer". In 1812, Robert Southey of the Quarterly Review condemned The Wealth of Nations as a "tedious and hard-hearted book". In 1821, The Times quoted Smith's opinion that the interests of corn dealers and the people were the same. In 1826, the English radical William Cobbett criticised in his Rural Rides the political economists' hostility to the Poor Law: "Well, amidst all this suffering, there is one good thing; the Scotch political economy is blown to the devil, and the Edinburgh Review and Adam Smith along with it". In 1829, Thomas Carlyle named Smith as one of the philosophers of the age who taught that "our happiness depends entirely on external circumstances" and to whose eye "all is well that works quietly."

The Liberal statesman William Ewart Gladstone chaired the meeting of the Political Economy Club to celebrate the centenary of the publication of The Wealth of Nations. The Liberal historian Lord Acton believed that The Wealth of Nations gave a "scientific backbone to liberal sentiment" and that it was the "classic English philosophy of history".

==== Public policy ====
Smith's biographer John Rae contended that The Wealth of Nations shaped government policy soon after it was published.

===== 18th century =====
In 1777, in the first budget after the book was published, Prime Minister Lord North got the idea for two new taxes from the book: one on man-servants and the other on property sold at auction. The budget of 1778 introduced the inhabited house duty and the malt tax, both recommended by Smith. In 1779, Smith was consulted by politicians Henry Dundas and Lord Carlisle on the subject of giving Ireland free trade.

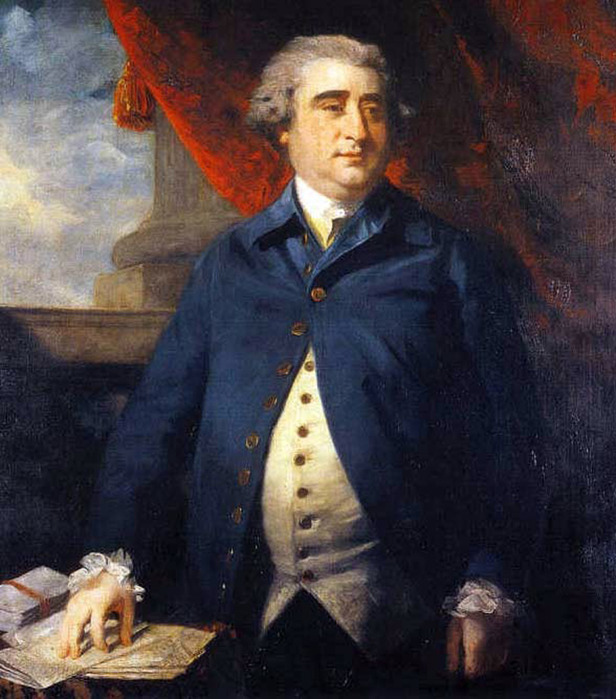
Charles James Fox was the first person to mention The Wealth of Nations in Parliament.

The Wealth of Nations was first mentioned in Parliament by the Whig leader Charles James Fox on 11 November 1783:

There was a maxim laid down in an excellent book upon the Wealth of Nations which had been ridiculed for its simplicity, but which was indisputable as to its truth. In that book it was stated that the only way to become rich was to manage matters so as to make one's income exceed one's expenses. This maxim applied equally to an individual and to a nation. The proper line of conduct therefore was by a well-directed economy to retrench every current expense, and to make as large a saving during the peace as possible.

However Fox once told Charles Butler sometime after 1785 that he had never read the book and that "There is something in all these subjects which passes my comprehension; something so wide that I could never embrace them myself nor find any one who did." When Fox was dining with Lord Lauderdale in 1796, Lauderdale remarked that they knew nothing of political economy before Adam Smith wrote. "Pooh," replied Fox, "your Adam Smiths are nothing, but" (he added, turning to the company) "that is his love; we must spare him there." Lauderdale replied: "I think he is everything", to which Fox rejoined: "That is a great proof of your affection". Fox also found Adam Smith "tedious" and believed that one half of The Wealth of Nations could be "omitted with much benefit to the subject".

The Wealth of Nations was next mentioned in Parliament by Robert Thornton MP in 1787 to support the Commercial Treaty with France. In the same year George Dempster MP referenced it in the debate on the proposal to farm the post-horse duties and in 1788 by a Mr. Hussy on the Wool Exportation Bill.

The prime minister, William Pitt, praised Smith in the House of Commons on 17 February 1792: "…an author of our own times now unfortunately no more (I mean the author of a celebrated treatise on the Wealth of Nations), whose extensive knowledge of detail, and depth of philosophical research will, I believe, furnish the best solution to every question connected with the history of commerce, or with the systems of political economy." In the same year it was quoted by Samuel Whitbread MP and Fox (on the division of labour) in the debate on the armament against Russia and also by William Wilberforce in introducing his Bill against the slave trade. The book was not mentioned in the House of Lords until a debate in 1793 between Lord Lansdowne and Lord Loughborough about revolutionary principles in France. On 16 May 1797, Pitt said in the debate on the suspension of cash payments by the Bank of England that Smith was "that great author" but his arguments, "though always ingenious", were "sometimes injudicious". In 1798, Sir John Mitford, the Solicitor-General, cited the book in his criticism of bills of exchange given in consideration of other bills.

During a debate on the price of corn in 1800 Lord Warwick said:

There was hardly any kind of property on which the law did not impose some restraints and regulations with regard to the sale of them, except that of provisions. This was probably done on the principles laid down by a celebrated and able writer, Doctor Adam Smith, who had maintained that every thing ought to be left to its own level. He knew something of that Gentleman, whose heart he knew was as sound as his head; and he was sure that had he lived to this day and beheld the novel state of wretchedness to which the country was now reduced ...; that Great Man would have reason to blush for some of the doctrines he had laid down. He would now have abundant opportunities of observing that all those artificial means of enhancing the price of provisions, which he had considered as no way mischievous, were practised at this time to a most alarming extent. He would see the Farmer keeping up his produce while the poor were labouring under all the miseries of want, and he would see Forestallers, Regraters, and all kinds of Middle-men making large profits upon it.

Lord Grenville replied:

[W]hen that great man lived, ... his book was first published at a period, previous to which there had been two or three seasons of great dearth and distress; and during those seasons there were speculators without number, who ... proposed that a certain price should be fixed on every article: but all their plans were wisely rejected, and the Treatise on the Wealth of Nations, which came forward soon after, pointed out in the clearest light how absurd and futile they must have been.

===== 19th century =====
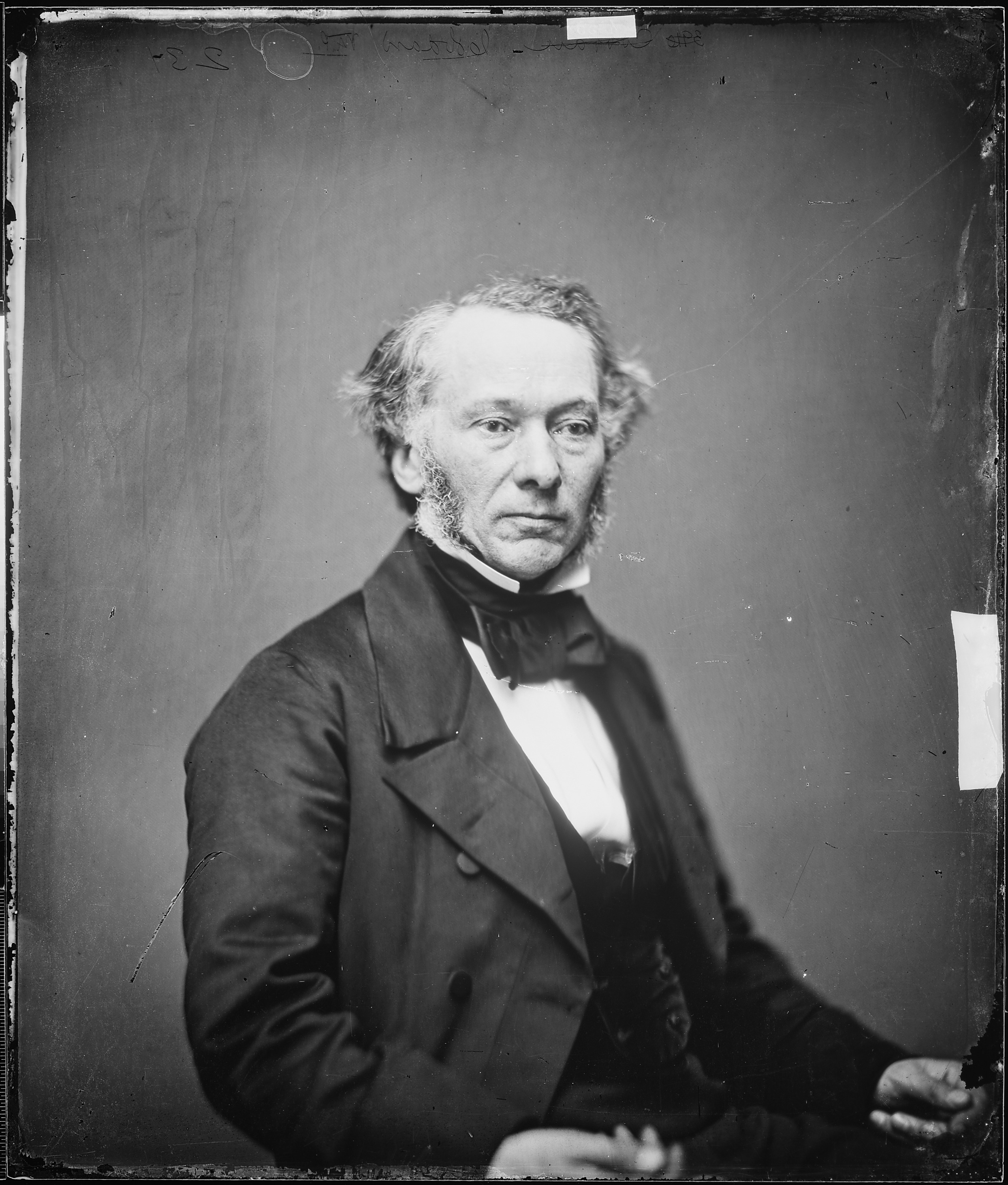
The Wealth of Nations influenced Richard Cobden.

The Radical MP Richard Cobden studied The Wealth of Nations as a young man; his copy is still in the library of his home at Dunford House and there are marginal notes on the places where Smith criticizes British colonial policies. There are none on the passage about the invisible hand. Cobden campaigned for free trade in his agitation against the Corn Laws. In 1843, Cobden quoted Smith's protest against the "plain violation of the most sacred property" of every man derived from his labour. In 1844, he cited Smith's opposition to slave labour and claimed that Smith had been misrepresented by protectionists as a monopolist. In 1849, Cobden claimed that he had "gone through the length and breadth of this country, with Adam Smith in my hand, to advocate the principles of Free Trade." He also said he had tried "to popularise to the people of this country, and of the Continent, those arguments with which Adam Smith ... and every man who has written on this subject, have demonstrated the funding system to be injurious to mankind."

Cobden believed it to be morally wrong to lend money to be spent on war. In 1849, when The Times claimed political economists were against Cobden on this, Cobden wrote: "I can quote Adam Smith whose authority is without appeal now in intellectual circles, it gives one the basis of science upon which to raise appeals to the moral feelings." In 1850, when the Russian government attempted to raise a loan to cover the deficit brought about by its war against Hungary, Cobden said: "I take my stand on one of the strongest grounds in stating that Adam Smith and other great authorities on political economy are opposed to the very principle of such loans." In 1863, during Cobden's dispute with The Times over its claims that his fellow Radical John Bright wanted to divide the land of the rich amongst the poor, Cobden read to a friend the passage in the Wealth of Nations which criticized primogeniture and entail. Cobden said that if Bright had been as plain-speaking as Smith, "how he would have been branded as an incendiary and Socialist". In 1864, Cobden proclaimed, "If I were five-and-twenty or thirty, ... I would take Adam Smith in hand, and I would have a League for free trade in Land just as we had a League for free trade in Corn. You will find just the same authority in Adam Smith for the one as for the other."

=== United States ===
After the conquest of New France in 1760 during the French and Indian War, Charles Townshend suggested that the American colonists provide help to pay for the war debt by paying an additional tax on tea. During this time, Adam Smith was working for Townshend and developed a relationship with Benjamin Franklin, who played a vital role in the American Revolution three months after Smith's The Wealth of Nations book was released.

James Madison, in a speech delivered in Congress on 2 February 1791, cited The Wealth of Nations while opposing a national bank: "The principal disadvantages consisted in, 1st. banishing the precious metals, by substituting another medium to perform their office: This effect was inevitable. It was admitted by the most enlightened patrons of banks, particularly by Smith in the Wealth of Nations." Thomas Jefferson, writing to John Norvell on 14 June 1807, claimed that, on "the subjects of money & commerce, Smith's Wealth of Nations is the best book to be read, unless Say's Political Economy can be had, which treats the same subject on the same principles, but in a shorter compass & more lucid manner."

=== Translations ===
The Wealth of Nations was translated into French, German and Spanish in the late 18th century. The French version by Germain Garnier was not the first to appear, but is regarded as better than earlier translations. In the 1840s, famous economist and free trader Adolphe Blanqui supplemented Garnier's translation with notes and comments by the principal economists in Europe. The Spanish Inquisition banned The Wealth of Nations in French translation, but José Alonso Ortiz was able to publish a virtually complete Spanish translation (although he appears to have self-censored the text as it relates to usury). This translation, which was dedicated to Manuel Godoy, has remained in print, although it has been modernised by later editors.

== Modern evaluation ==
With 36,331 citations, it is the second most cited book in economics published before 1950, behind Karl Marx's Das Kapital.

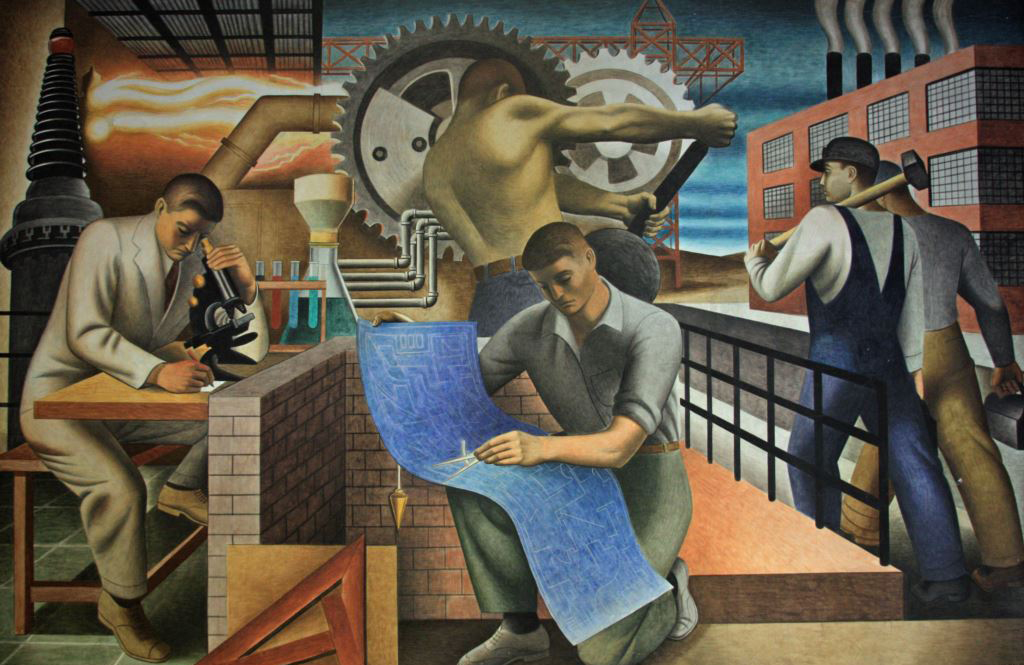
1938 mural "The Wealth of the Nation" by Seymour Fogel is an interpretation of the theme of Social Security.

George Stigler attributes to Smith "the most important substantive proposition in all of economics" and foundation of resource-allocation theory. It is that, under competition, owners of resources (labour, land, and capital) will use them most profitably, resulting in an equal rate of return in equilibrium for all uses (adjusted for apparent differences arising from such factors as training, trust, hardship, and unemployment). He also describes Smith's theorem that "the division of labour is limited by the extent of the market" as the "core of a theory of the functions of firm and industry" and a "fundamental principle of economic organisation."

Paul Samuelson finds in Smith's pluralist use of supply and demand—as applied to wages, rents, and profit—a valid and valuable anticipation of the general equilibrium modelling of Walras a century later. Moreover, Smith's allowance for wage increases in the short and intermediate term from capital accumulation and invention added a realism missed later by Malthus and Ricardo in their propounding a rigid subsistence-wage theory of labour supply.

Modern scholarship emphasizes that Adam Smith used the metaphor of the "invisible hand" sparingly and in specific contexts, rather than as a universal law of market harmony. Smith highlighted the unintended consequences of individual self‑interest, but he also acknowledged the dangers of monopolies and supported certain forms of state intervention. Later economists developed related interpretations: Friedrich Hayek, for example, argued that prices function as information signals that coordinate dispersed knowledge in society, allowing individuals to adjust their actions without central direction.

In noting the last words of the Wealth of Nations,

If any of the provinces of the British empire cannot be made to contribute towards the support of the whole empire, it is surely time that Great Britain should free herself from the expence of defending those provinces in time of war, and of supporting any part of their civil or military establishments in time of peace, and endeavour to accommodate her future views and designs to the real mediocrity of her circumstances.

Ronald Coase suggests that if Smith's earlier proposal of granting colonies representation in the British parliament proportional to their contributions to public revenues had been followed, "there would have been no 1776, … America would now be ruling England, and we [in America] would be today celebrating Adam Smith not simply as the author of the Wealth of Nations, but hailing him as a founding father."

Mark Blaug argues that it was Smith's achievement to shift the burden of proof against those maintaining that the pursuit of self-interest does not achieve social good. But he notes Smith's relevant attention to definite institutional arrangements and process as disciplining self-interest to widen the scope of the market, accumulate capital, and grow income.

Economic anthropologist David Graeber argues that throughout antiquity one can identify many different systems of credit and later monetary exchange, drawing evidence for his argument from historical and also ethnographical records, that the traditional explanation for the origins of monetary economies from primitive bartering systems, as laid out by Adam Smith, does not find empirical support. The author argues that credit systems developed as means of account long before the advent of coinage around 600 BCE, and can still be seen operating in non-monetary economies. The idea of barter, on the other hand, seems only to apply to limited exchanges between societies that had infrequent contact and often in a context of ritualised warfare, rendering its conceptualisation among economists as a myth. As an alternative explanation for the creation of economic life, the author suggests that it originally related to social currencies, closely related to non-market quotidian interactions among a community and based on the "everyday communism" that is based on mutual expectations and responsibilities among individuals. This type of economy is, then, contrasted with the moral foundations of exchange based on formal equality and reciprocity (but not necessarily leading to market relations) and hierarchy, based on clear inequalities that tend to crystallise in customs and castes.

== See also ==
- The Theory of Moral Sentiments (1759), Adam Smith's other major work
- The National Gain, a pamphlet by Finnish–Swedish economist and politician Anders Chydenius which preceded The Wealth of Nations and which had similar ideas.
- The Big Myth, a book by Naomi Oreskes and Erik M. Conway which details how nascent electricity industry associations commissioned George Stigler to rewrite The Wealth of Nations by redacting 1,000 pages that detail the shortcomings of laissez faire capitalism and the need for government intervention to prevent capitalism's harsh effects on people who have no capital.
