= The National Gain =

Economic pamphlet promoting liberalism

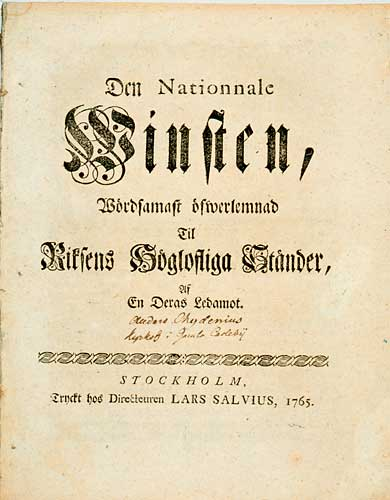
The frontpage of the first edition of The National Gain.

The National Gain (Swedish title: Den Nationnale Winsten) is the main work of the Swedish-Finnish scientist, philosopher and politician Anders Chydenius, published in 1765. In this thesis Chydenius argues in favour of free export trade rights for the province of Ostrobothnia and lays down the principles of liberalism and the free markets – for example, free trade and industry – eleven years before Adam Smith in The Wealth of Nations (1776). The book also includes a description of what Smith later dubbed the "invisible hand". In the book, Chydenius attacks the export subsidy as an example of the harmful effects of government intervention on the domestic economy.
