= Anders Chydenius =

Swedish-Finnish priest, politician, enlightenment thinker and economist (1729–1803)

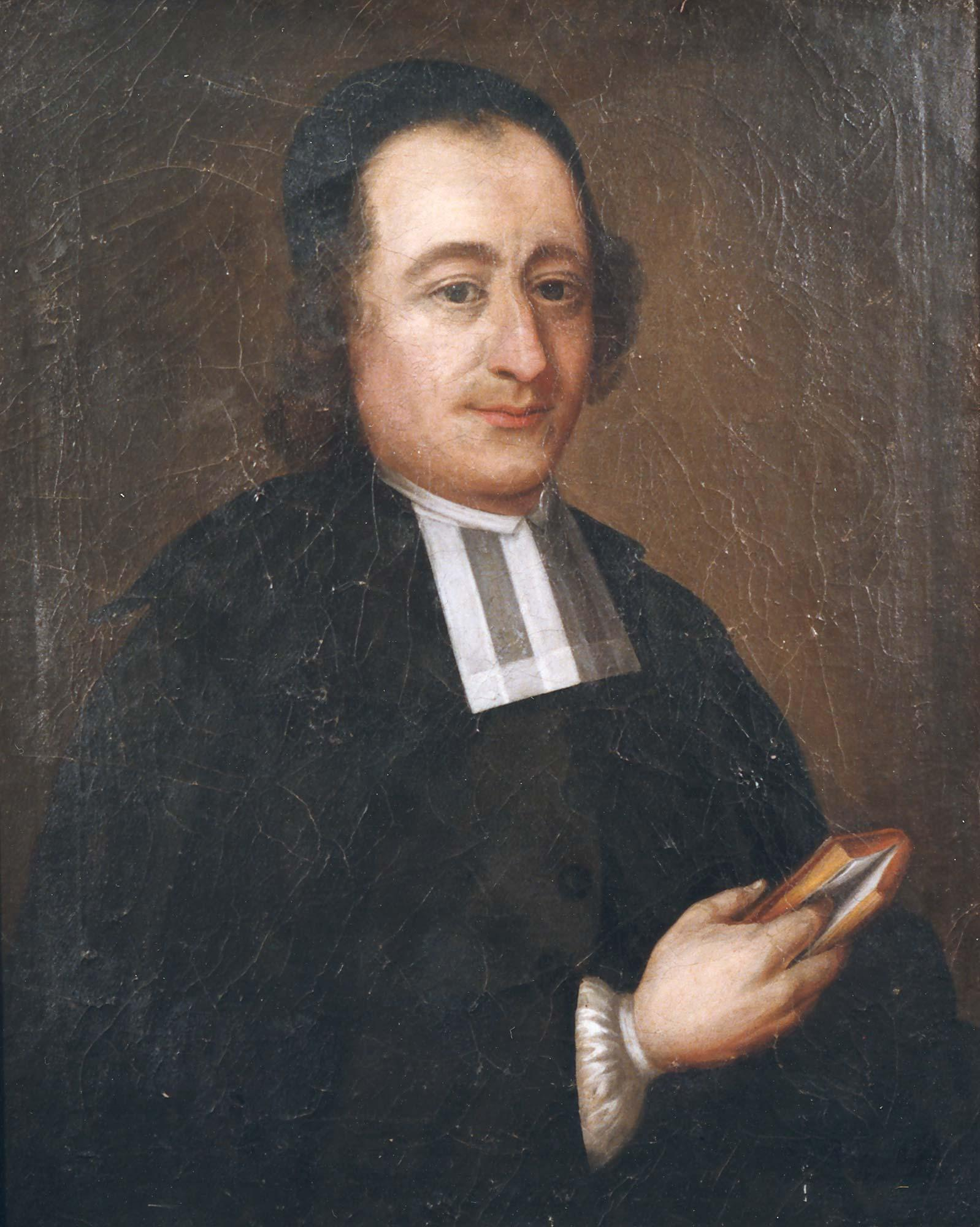
- Portrait, c. 1770
- Born: 26 February 1729; Sotkamo, Sweden (now Finland)
- Died: 1 February 1803 (aged 73); Gamlakarleby, Sweden (now Kokkola, Finland)

Philosophical work
- Era: 18th-century philosophy
- Region: Western philosophy
- School: Liberalism, Age of Liberty
- Main interests: Mathematics, natural science, economics, political philosophy
- Notable ideas: Economic liberalism, freedom of religion, freedom of speech, migration, rights of servants and labourers

Anders Chydenius (Finland Swedish: [ˈandærs tɕyˈdeːniʉs]; 26 February 1729 – 1 February 1803) was a Swedish-Finnish Lutheran priest, member of the Swedish Riksdag, and one of the most important champions of democratic development in 18th-century Sweden, known as the leading classical liberal of Nordic history. He championed free trade, freedom of the press, and the rights of servants, labourers and the rural poor.

Born in Sotkamo, Finland (then part of Sweden), Chydenius became a priest and Enlightenment philosopher. As a member of the Riksdag of the Estates in 1765–66, he played a decisive role in establishing Sweden's first Freedom of the Press Act. He was ultimately expelled from the Diet as punishment for his radical political activities.

== Biography ==
=== Early life ===
Anders Chydenius was born in 1729 in Sotkamo, Ostrobothnia (now part of Kainuu Region) where his father Jacob was a chaplain. The family moved to Kuusamo in 1734 where his father became a parish rector. Anders' childhood was spent in the barren area of northern Finland. He and his brother Samuel were taught privately by their father and then they went to Uleåborg (Oulu) grammar school (Uleåborg trivialskola). After the Russo-Swedish War (1741–1743), the boys studied privately in Tornio and entered The Royal Academy of Åbo in 1745. They also studied at Uppsala University. Anders studied mathematics, natural sciences, Latin and philosophy. In 1746 the father Jacob and family moved to Gamlakarleby (Kokkola).

=== Nedervetil ===
In 1753, after graduation, Anders was appointed preacher of the Chapel of the dependent parish of Nedervetil (today, part of Kronoby) in Ostrobothnia. He was married in 1755 to Beata Magdalena Mellberg, daughter of a merchant from Jakobstad. The couple was childless.

While in Nedervetil he was active in many projects such as the clearing of the marshes, experimenting with new breeds of animals and plants, and adopting new methods of cultivation of potatoes and tobacco. His aim was to enlighten the peasants by example. Chydenius practiced medicine and became known by inoculating ordinary people against smallpox, an early form of vaccination he had promoted together with his father already in the 1760s. He also performed cataract and other eye operations and prepared medicines for patients who sought him out. His medical work continued throughout his life: when dysentery spread during the war in 1790, he established a temporary municipal hospital in Gamlakarleby which he led with success.

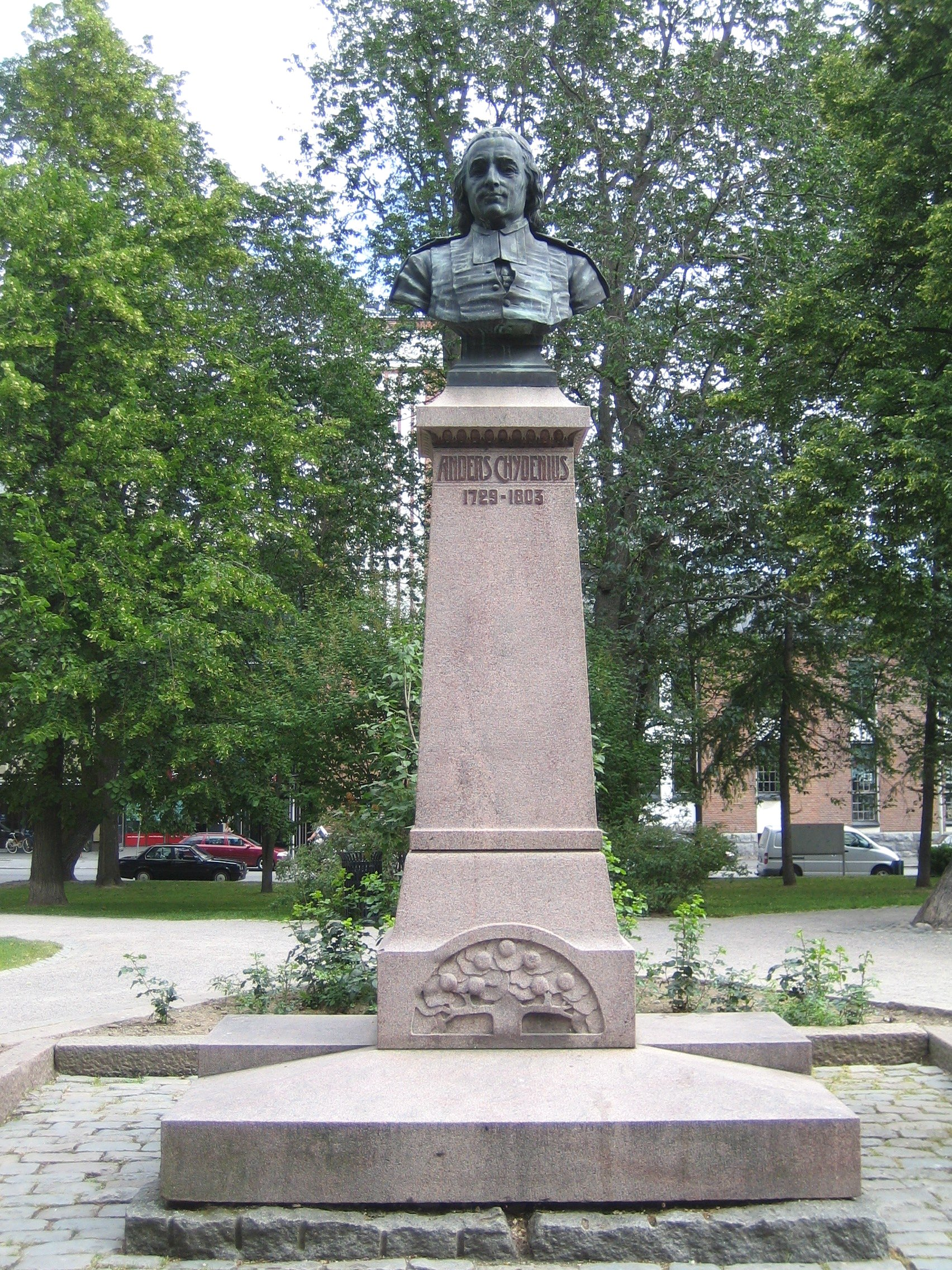
Statue of Anders Chydenius in Kokkola, Finland.

=== The 1765–1766 Riksdag of the Estates ===
Some of his first writings were about practical matters such as the moss overgrowing the meadows, and improvements in the design of horse carriages. Then he moved on to social questions and became known as a writer and speaker. He was sent to the Diet in 1765 to obtain free trading rights for the towns of Ostrobothnia. The cities of Gamlakarleby, Vasa (Vaasa), Björneborg (Pori) and Uleåborg received navigational rights which helped with their later development as well as helping all of Ostrobothnia. At that time, the tar which should have brought prosperity to his town and the coast had to be sold abroad through Stockholm, which made most of the profits. Largely due to Chydenius' efforts, Stockholm's monopoly was broken and from 1765, the towns gained freedom to sell and ship tar directly to foreign customers. Chydenius participated actively in the Diet, and published several articles of criticism which caused a great stir. One of the results of his activities in the Diet was a stricter parliamentary control of the government budget.

He considered that one of his greatest achievements was the establishment of freedom of the press. A memorial on press freedom was brought before the Diet and Chydenius was elected to the committee handling the matter, whose work he in practice led during the winter of 1765–1766. The conservative majority on the committee attended meetings irregularly, allowing press freedom's supporters to almost single-handedly prepare the legislation. In the autumn of 1766 the three non-noble estates approved the proposal, and Sweden gained what was at the time the world's most liberal press freedom law — even though Chydenius had by then already been expelled from the Diet.

Alongside his press freedom work, Chydenius led the efforts of the appropriations committee (bevillningsdeputationen) to transfer control of state finances from the Secret Committee to the full assembly of estates. The Secret Committee had kept state finances firmly in its grip throughout the Age of Liberty, and was seen by radicals as an unacceptably aristocratic body in which the peasant estate had no representation despite bearing the heaviest tax burden. The committee used a form of strike — refusing to propose any taxes until the estates received detailed accounts of the budget deficit — and ultimately forced the Secret Committee to concede in May 1766, transferring financial oversight to the full plenum of estates and giving peasants the same right as other estates to monitor the use of public funds.

His radical activities caused him to be expelled from the Diet in 1766 — ostensibly for criticising the Cap administration's monetary policies, but in practice as punishment for his decisive role in establishing freedom of the press and transferring parliamentary control of state finances away from the aristocratic Secret Committee.

=== Kokkola and later life ===
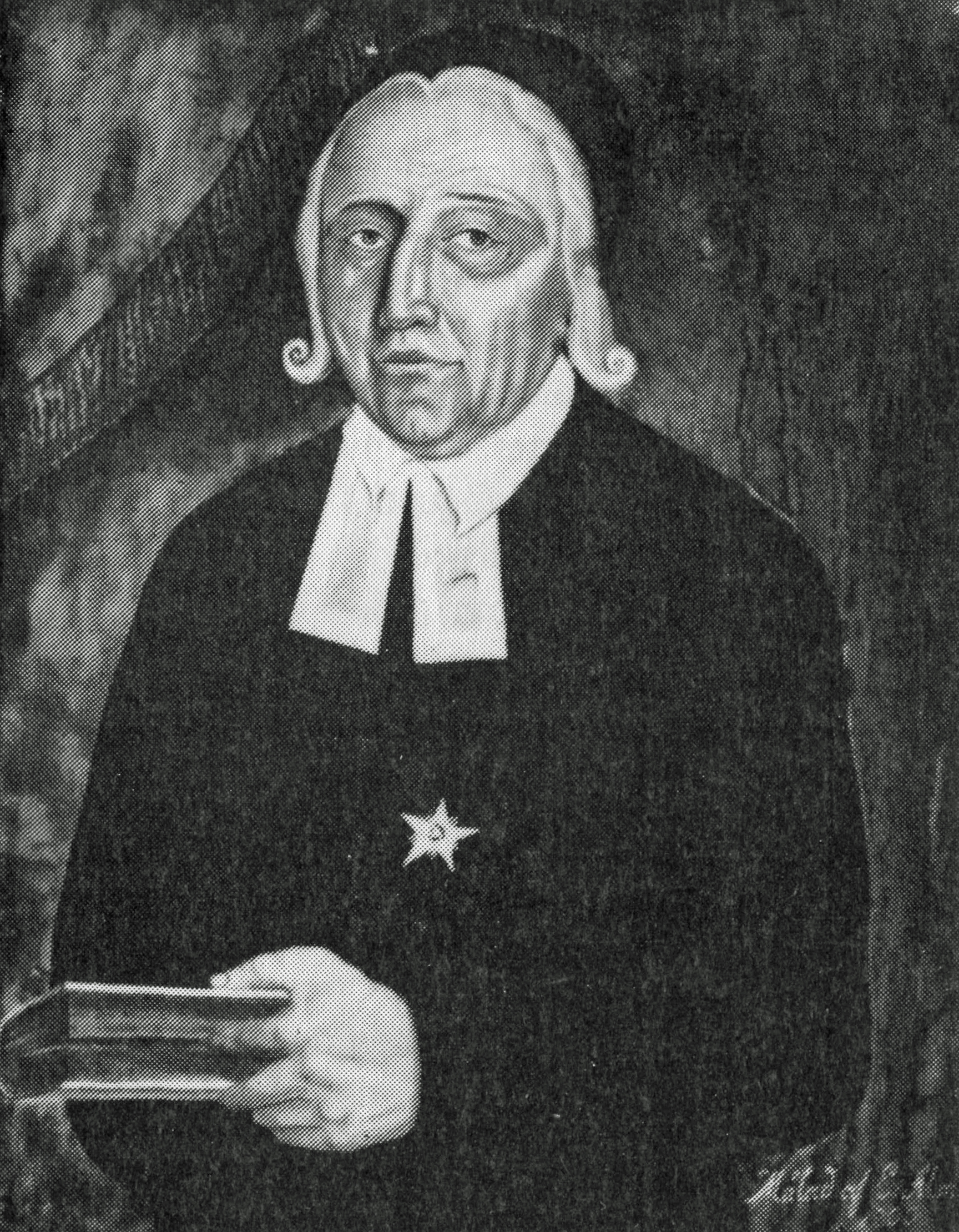
Portrait by Immanuel Alm, c. 1800

In 1770 he was appointed rector of Gamlakarleby where he concentrated on parish work. He maintained his own orchestra, and rehearsed with them. They gave concerts in the rectory's reception hall. His father lived in the parsonage at Gamlakarleby from 1746 to 1766, and Anders lived there from 1770 to 1803.

Following Gustav III's coup d'état in 1772, which ended parliamentary rule for another century, Chydenius initially approached the new regime with cautious optimism. His attitude toward Gustav III remained ambivalent throughout: he could not accept the king's severe restrictions on freedom of the press, but supported certain other reforms. He contributed to the legalisation of Jewish and Catholic immigration into Sweden, drafting the memorial through which Gustav III pushed through limited religious freedom for foreigners. As a reward, Chydenius and some other supportive clergymen were awarded the doctorate in theology — a gesture his opponents within the clergy viewed with suspicion. Ultimately, the king's increasingly autocratic position brought Chydenius out of favour, and he largely withdrew from national politics.

Between 1778 and 1779 Anders Chydenius once again participated in the Diet, at which the position of hired hands was brought up. He championed the rights of the servant class. At the suggestion of King Gustavus III, he introduced a bill whereby foreigners were also granted limited rights to practice their own religion. He participated in the Diet again in 1793 and was active as a writer covering the development of agriculture, the burning of saltpeter, smallpox, and the settlement of Lapland. One of his main tasks during his latter years was the supervision of building an extension to the old parish church. In 1796 he became a member of the Swedish society Pro Fide et Christianismo, founded to promote Christian education, along with his nephew Jakob Tengström. He died in 1803.

== Ideas ==
Chydenius focused his liberal writings on attacking the mercantilism, mercantilist conquest politics, conservatism, protectionism and privilege that were prevalent at the time. In his view, state offices should not be for sale and the state should not impose any restrictions or privileges on any act. He criticised the clergy, nobility, civil servants and other privileged people, saying that they lived off the work of peasants, seeking to turn the debate on the status of peasants into a debate on the status of the privileged. The prevailing view was that peasants and workers had to be kept poor to prevent them from idling. Chydenius showed that, on the contrary, workers were not idlers who should be forced to make the state rich, but vital individuals who, free to pursue their own happiness, would also benefit others.

Chydenius was in favour of peace, demanded full and inviolable land ownership, wanted to give refugees protection and peasants and artisans the right to sell their products whenever and wherever they wanted. He opposed price and wage regulation and the labour strike, and demanded the right of workers to choose their employers. To save sparsely populated Lapland, he proposed turning it into a night-watchman state.

=== Free trade ===
In 1765 Chydenius published a pamphlet called The National Gain (Den nationnale winsten), in which he proposes ideas of free trade and industry, explores the relationship between economy and society, and lays out the principles for liberalism, capitalism, and modern democracy. The pamphlet contains ideas anticipating Adam Smith's concept of the invisible hand, though the resemblance is best explained by their common French sources rather than independent discovery — Chydenius himself was unaware of Smith's work, which was not published until 1776.

The intellectual background to Chydenius's ideas on economic freedom was primarily French: his most important source was the Marquis de Mirabeau the Elder, whose major work had been published in Swedish translation in 1759, and whose ideas on free enterprise Chydenius developed and applied to Swedish conditions. The Swedish writer Carl Leuhusen had advocated an equally radical position in 1761. Chydenius thus wrote within an established tradition, though he expressed its ideas with exceptional clarity and force.

Chydenius also put his theories into practice by proposing to the Riksdag of the Estates a drastic trade liberalization of towns along the Gulf of Bothnia. However, most of his other propositions were not realized, such as turning Lapland to a nightwatchman state to make the poor province prosper economically:

– free state, private ownership and individual freedom. Inhabitants could choose whatever profession, freedom of trade would be complete, there would be no privileges, regulation or taxes. Bureaucracy would be nonexistent, and the only officer would be a judge who would oversee that no-one's rights would be suppressed.

=== Freedom of expression ===
Chydenius became a great proponent of freedom of the press. In a report published in 1776, he wrote:

No evidence should be needed that a certain freedom of writing and printing is one of the strongest bulwarks of a free organisation of the state, as without it, the estates would not have sufficient information for the drafting of good laws, and those dispensing justice would not be monitored, nor would the subjects know the requirements of the law, the limits of the rights of government, and their own responsibilities. Education and good conduct would be crushed; coarseness in thought, speech, and manners would prevail, and dimness would darken the entire sky of our freedom in a few years.

=== Natural equality ===
Chydenius was outspoken about universal rights and the abolition of privilege. He wanted to give the poor the same freedom as for everybody else and argued for the good of the poor, which was then rather exceptional among politicians. He promoted democracy and defended the freedom of religion, freedom of speech, freedom of trade and industry, and the workers rights. He called for an oversight of the way the state funds were spent. In modern language we would say he advocated openness and good governance.

In a 1778 essay, Thoughts Upon the Natural Rights of Servants and Peasants, he wrote:

Nature shapes them exactly like us. Their posture in the crib is the same as ours, their souls have the same reason as other peoples', whereby it is plain to see that the Lord of creation also had intended them to have equal rights with other people.

== Legacy ==
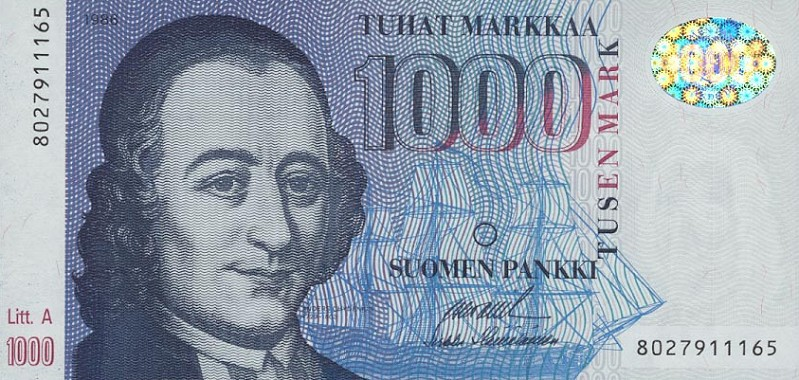
1000 Finnish marks banknote

Chydenius can be seen as a major influence on Nordic thinkers as well as real-life politics, strictly promoting classical liberalism. He has been labeled the father of Swedish liberalism. Both Sweden and Finland include him among their historical notables, and he is variably categorized either Swedish or Finnish by nationality.

Anders Chydenius is remembered as a man ahead of his time, expressing ideas that were radical in his day, but are now the backbone of the Nordic ideology. He can also be seen as an Enlightenment thinker, an advocate of science, arts, rational thinking and freedom. He was also a scientist and skilled eye-surgeon, the maker of several inventions, a pioneer of vaccination in Finland and the founder of an orchestra.

Chydenius was featured on the highest valued bank note (1000 marks) of the Finnish mark's last design series. There are also many place names referring to Chydenius in Kokkola, such as the Chydenia Shopping Center, which was completed in the town center in 2006.

Anders Chydenius was selected as the main motif in a recent Finnish commemorative coin, the €10 Anders Chydenius commemorative coin, minted in 2003. The obverse features an open book, referring to Chydenius's numerous publications and the Bible. On the reverse, a traditional village with a church and other buildings can be seen.

In the book Historiens 100 viktigaste svenskar ("100 Most Important Swedes in History"), written by Niklas Ekdal and Petter Karlsson, Chydenius was ranked as the seventeenth most important Swede in history. In Finland, Chydenius was ranked on the place #40 in the list of "Greatest Finns" in a voting contest organised by the national broadcasting company.

The Chydenius family is even today a well known cultural family in Finland. Composer Kaj Chydenius is Anders's distant relative.

== Selected works ==
- Americanska näfwerbåtar. Åbo 1753. (American Bark Boats.)
- Svar På samma Fråga (Om bästa sättet at upodla Mosslupna Ängar). Stockholm 1762. (How to Cultivate Mossy Meadows.)
- Svar på samma Fråga (Angående Kärrors Förbättring). Stockholm 1764. (The Improvement of Waggons.)
- Wederläggning Af de Skäl, Hwarmed man söker bestrida Öster- och Wästerbottniska Samt Wäster-Norrländske Städerne Fri Seglation. Stockholm 1765. (Counter-arguments to Those Who Would Attempt to Oppose Free Navigation between the Towns of Ostrobothnia, Västerbotten and Norland.)
- Swar På den af Kgl. Wetenskaps Academien förestälta Frågan: Hwad kan wara orsaken, at sådan myckenhet Swenskt folk årligen flytter utur Landet? Stockholm 1765. (For What Reason do so Many Swedes Emigrate Every Year?)
- Källan Til Rikets Wan-Magt. Stockholm 1765. (The Source of the Weakness of the Kingdom.)
- Den Nationnale Winsten. Wördsamast öfwerlemnad Til Riksens Höglofliga Ständer, Af En Deras Ledamot. Stockholm 1765. (The National Gain.)
- Omständeligt Swar, På den genom Trycket utkomne Wederläggning af Skriften, Kallad: Källan til Rikets Wanmagt, Jämte Anmärkningar Öfwer De wid samma Källa anstälda Wattu-Prof. Stockholm 1765. (In Reply to Critiques Applying to The Source of the Weakness of the Kingdom.)
- Berättelse Om Chinesiska Skrif-Friheten, Öfversatt af Danskan. Stockholm 1766. (A Report on the Freedom of the Press in China.)
- Rikets Hjelp, Genom en Naturlig Finance-System. Stockholm 1766. (Assisting the Kingdom through a Natural Monetary System.)
- Tal Hållet Vid Vår Allernådigste Konungs, Konung Gustaf III:s Höga Kröning, Den 29 Maji 1772. Stockholm 1772. (Speech on the Occasion of the Coronation of Gustavus III.)
- Svar På Vetenskaps och Vitterhets Samhällets I Götheborg Förestälta Fråga: Huruvida Landthandel för ett Rike i gemen är nyttig eller skadelig, och hvad mon den bidrager til industriens uplifvande eller aftagande? Stockholm 1777. (Is Rural Trade Advantageous or Disadvantageous to the Kingdom, and to What Extent does it Affect the Progress or Decline in Means of Livelihood?)
- Tankar Om Husbönders och Tienstehions Naturliga Rätt. Stockholm 1778. (Thoughts upon the Natural Rights of Servants and Peasants.)
- Memorial, Angående Religions-Frihet. Stockholm 1779. (Memorandum on the Freedom of Religious Faith.)
- Predikningar öfver Tio Guds Bud. Upsala 1781–82. (Sermons on the Ten Commandments.)
- Predikningar öfver Andra Hufvudstycket i Catechesen. Homiletiska försök. Vol. VI. St. 2. Stockholm 1784. (Sermons on the Second Main Part of the Catechism.)
- Om Saltpetter-Sjuderierna, särledes i Österbotten. Skrifter af Sällskapet för Allmänne Medborgerlige kunskaper II. Stockholm 1795. (Preparation of Saltpetre.)
- Tankar om Koppympningen För Finlands Allmoge. K. Finska Hushållnings-Sällskapets Handlingar 1. Åbo 1803. (Thoughts on Inoculating against Smallpox for the Finnish People.)

== See also ==
- Contributions to liberal theory
- History of economic thought
