= Victor de Riqueti, marquis de Mirabeau =

French physiocrat economist (1715–1789)

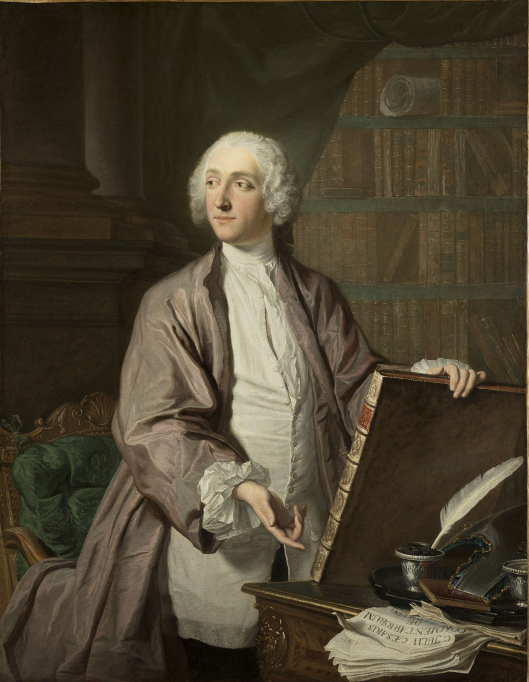
Victor de Riqueti, marquis de Mirabeau

Victor de Riqueti, Marquis de Mirabeau (French: [miʁabo]; 5 October 1715 – 13 July 1789) was a French economist of the Physiocratic school. He was the father of Honoré, Comte de Mirabeau and André Boniface Louis Riqueti de Mirabeau. He was, in distinction, often referred to as the elder Mirabeau as he had a younger brother, Jean-Antoine Riqueti de Mirabeau (1717–1794).

== Biography ==
Mirabeau was born in Pertuis. He was brought up very sternly by his father, and in 1728 joined the army. He took keenly to campaigning, but never rose above the rank of captain, owing to his being unable to get leave at court to buy a regiment. In 1737 he came into the family property on his father's death, and spent some pleasant years till 1743 in literary companionship with Luc de Clapiers, marquis de Vauvenargues and the poet Lefranc de Pompignan, which might have continued had he not determined to marry not for money, but for landed estates. The lady whose property he fancied was Marie-Geneviève, daughter of a M. de Vassan, a brigadier in the army, and widow of the marquis de Saulveboef, whom he married without previously seeing her on 21 April 1743. In the same year, Mirabeau was made a Knight of the Royal and Military Order of St. Louis.

The event that led Mirabeau to devote himself to political economy was undoubtedly his work on a manuscript of Richard Cantillon's Essai sur la nature du commerce en général, which he had in his possession as early as 1740. He elaborated a commentary of this text that gradually became what became his Ami des hommes.

While in garrison at Bordeaux Mirabeau had made the acquaintance of Montesquieu (1689−1755), and after retiring from the army he wrote his first work, his Testament Politique (1747), which demanded for the prosperity of France a return of the French noblesse to their old position in the Middle Ages. in 1749, his son Honoré Gabriel was born. This work was followed in 1750 by a book on the Utilité des états provinciaux, which was attributed to Montesquieu himself. In 1756 Mirabeau made his first appearance as a political economist by the publication of his L'Ami des hommes ou Traité de la population ("The friend of Man, or treatise on the population"). This work has been often attributed to the influence, and in part even to the pen, of Quesnay, the founder of the economical school of the physiocrats, but was really written before the marquis had made the acquaintance of the physician of Madame de Pompadour.

In 1760 he published his Théorie de l'impot, in which he attacked with all the vehemence of his son the farmers-general of the taxes, who got him imprisoned for eight days at Vincennes, and then exiled to his country estate at Bignon near Nemours. At Bignon the school of the physiocrats was really established, and the marquis in 1765 bought the Journal de l'agriculture, du commerce, et des finances, which became the organ of the school. He was recognized as a leader of political thinkers by Prince Leopold of Tuscany, afterwards emperor, and by Gustav III of Sweden, who in 1772 sent him the Grand Cross of the Order of Vasa.

But his marriage had not been happy; he had separated from his wife in 1762, and had, he believed, secured her safely in the provinces by a lettre de cachet, when in 1772 she suddenly appeared in Paris, and commenced proceedings for a separation. One of his own daughters had encouraged his wife to take this step. He was determined to keep the case quiet, if possible, for the sake of Mme de Pailly, a Swiss lady whom he had loved since 1756. But his wife would not let him rest; her plea was rejected in 1777, but she renewed her suit, and, though Honoré had pleaded his father's case, was successful in 1781. This trial quite broke the health of the marquis, as well as his fortune; he sold his estate at Bignon, and hired a house at Argenteuil, where he lived quietly till his death.

The marquis's younger brother, Jean Antoine Riquetti, the bailli (d. 1794), served with distinction in the navy, but his brusque manners made success at court impossible. In 1763 he became general of the galleys of Malta. In 1767 he returned to France and took charge of the château de Mirabeau, helping the marquis in his disastrous lawsuits.

Mirabeau was nicknamed "Friend of Man", after his work L'Ami des Hommes.

He was the first to employ the term "social science" in French in 1767.

== Works ==
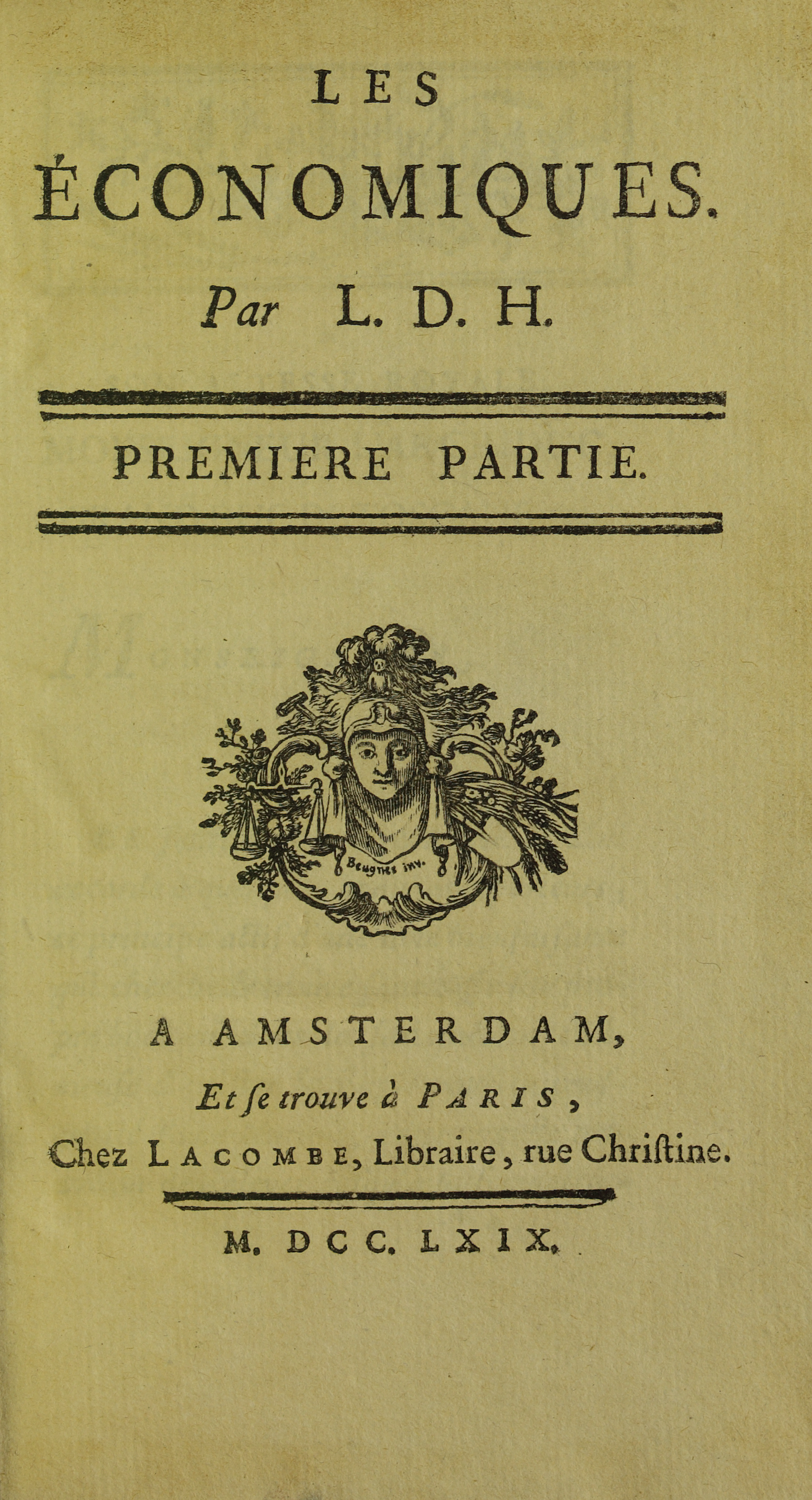
Economiques, 1769

- L'ami des hommes : ou, Traité de la population (1759)
  - Volume 1: online
  - Volume 2: online
  - Volume 4: online (1762)
  - Volume 5: online
  - Volume 7: online (1762)
- Théorie de l’impôt (1761), online
- Les économiques
- Philosophie rurale (ou, Économie générale et politique de l'agriculture, reduite à l'ordre immuable des loix physiques & morales, qui assurent la prospérité des empires) (1763)
  - Volume 1 (Volltext online)
  - Volume 2 (Volltext online)
  - Volume 3: (Volltext online)
- La science ou Les droits et les devoirs de l’homme (1774)

== Sources ==
- Louis de Loménie Les Mirabeau (2 vols., 1879). Also Henri Ripert, Le Marquis de Mirabeau, ses theories politiques et économiques
