= Bignot =

Bignot is an English surname. Notable people with the surname include:

- Paul Bignot (born 1986), English footballer
- Marcus Bignot (born 1974), English footballer and manager

== See also ==
- Bignon
- Bignor
