= Honoré Gabriel Riqueti, comte de Mirabeau =

French writer, orator and statesman (1749–1791)

Mirabeau
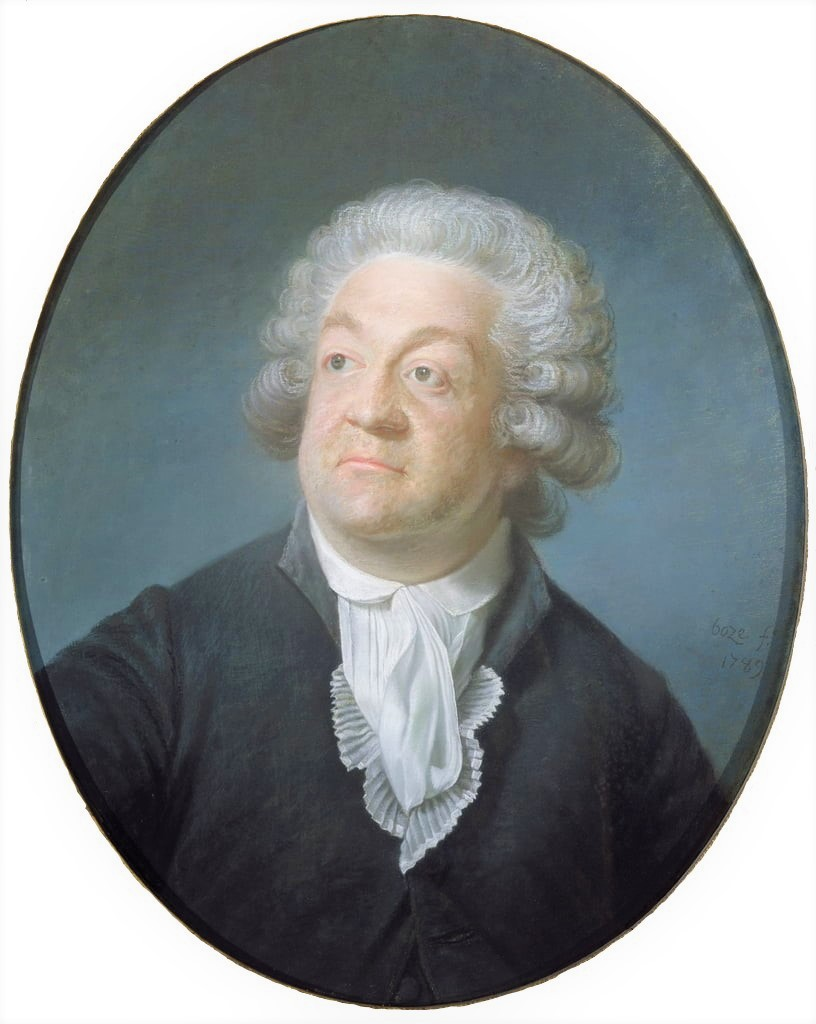
- Portrait by Joseph Boze, 1789

Member of the Constituent Assembly from Provence
- In office 9 July 1789 – 2 April 1791
- Constituency: Aix-en-Provence

Member of the Estates-General for the Third Estate
- In office 5 May 1789 – 9 July 1789
- Constituency: Provence

Personal details
- Born: Honoré Gabriel Riqueti; 9 March 1749 Le Bignon, Orléanais, France
- Died: 2 April 1791 (aged 42) Paris, Seine, France
- Party: National (1790–1791)
- Spouse(s): Émilie de Covet, Marchioness of Marignane (m. 1772; div. 1782)
- Children: 1
- Parents: Victor de Riqueti, marquis de Mirabeau (father); Marie-Geneviève de Vassan (mother)
- Education: Aix University
- Profession: Soldier, writer, journalist

Military service
- Allegiance: France
- Branch/service: Royal Army
- Years of service: 1768–1769
- Rank: Sub-lieutenant
- Battles/wars: Conquest of Corsica

Honoré Gabriel Riqueti, Count of Mirabeau (French: [miʁabo]; 9 March 1749 – 2 April 1791), known simply as Mirabeau, was a French writer, orator, and statesman, and a prominent figure of the early stages of the French Revolution.

A member of the nobility, Mirabeau had been involved in numerous scandals that had left his reputation in ruins. Well-known for his oratory skills, Mirabeau quickly rose to the top of the French political hierarchy following his election to the Estates-General in 1789, and was recognized as a leader of the newly organized National Assembly. Among the revolutionaries, Mirabeau was an advocate of the moderate position of constitutional monarchy modelled after that of Great Britain. He was also a leading member of the Jacobin Club.

Mirabeau died of pericarditis in 1791 and was regarded as a national hero and a father of the Revolution. He received a grand burial and was the first to be interred at the Panthéon. During the 1792 trial of Louis XVI, the discovery that Mirabeau had secretly been in the pay of the king brought him into posthumous disgrace, and two years later his remains were removed from the Panthéon. Historians are split on whether Mirabeau was a great leader who almost saved the nation from the Terror, a venal demagogue lacking political or moral values, or a traitor in the pay of the enemy.

== Family history ==
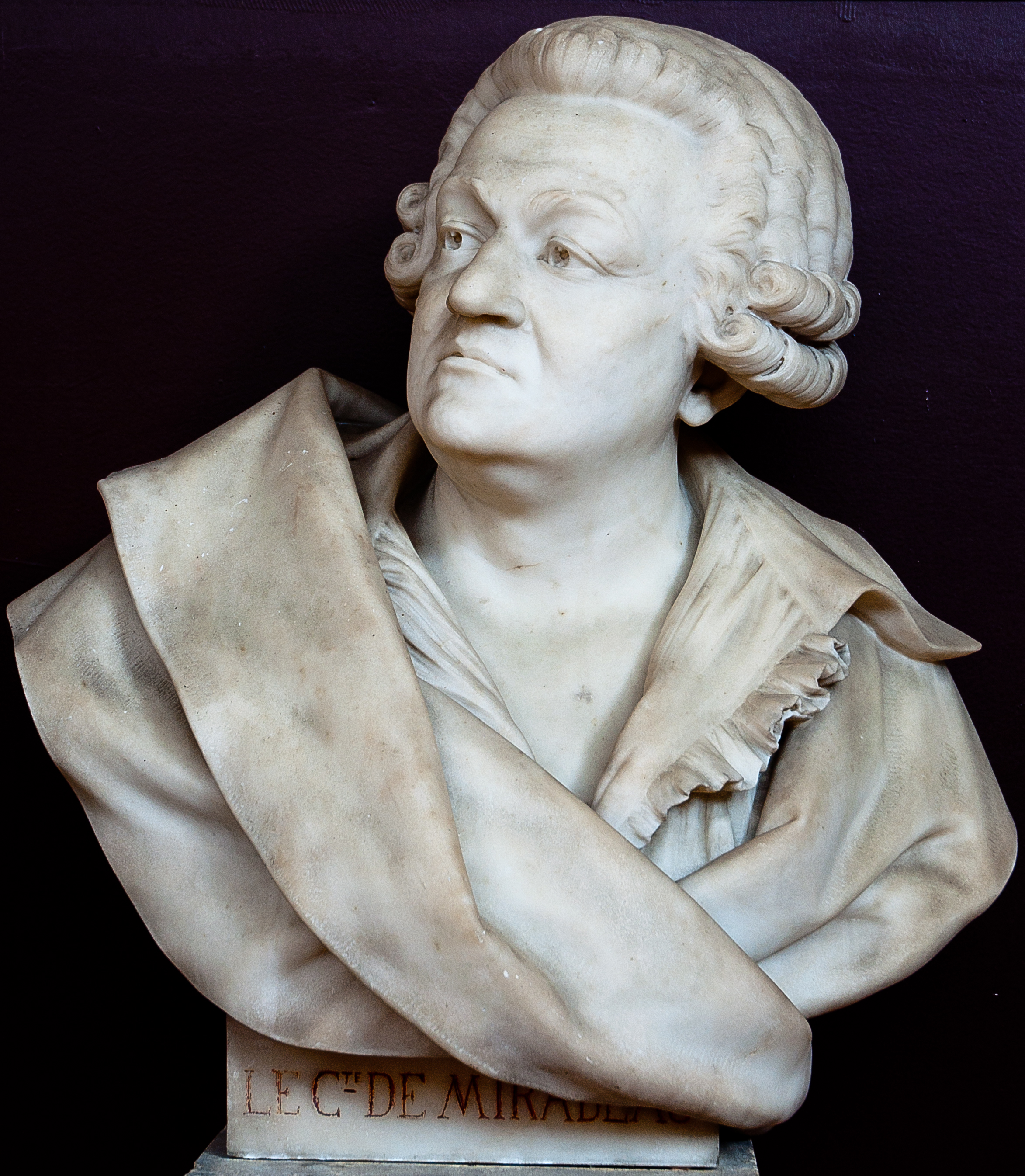
Bust of Honoré Gabriel Riqueti de Mirabeau at Palace of Versailles

The family of Riqueti, with possible distant origins in Italy, became wealthy through merchant trading in Marseille. In 1570, Jean Riqueti bought the château and seigniory of Mirabeau, which had belonged to the great Provençal family of Barras. In 1685, Honoré Riqueti obtained the title "marquis de Mirabeau".

His son, Jean Antoine, grandfather of Honoré Gabriel Riqueti, served with distinction through all the later campaigns of the reign of Louis XIV. At the Battle of Cassano (1705), he suffered a neck wound so severe that he had to wear a silver stock ever after. Because he tended to be blunt and tactless, he never rose above the rank of colonel. On retiring from the service, he married Françoise de Castellane, with whom he had three sons: Victor (marquis de Mirabeau), Jean Antoine (bailli de Mirabeau) and Louis Alexandre (comte de Mirabeau). Honoré Gabriel Riqueti, comte de Mirabeau, was the son of Victor.

== Early life ==
Honoré-Gabriel Mirabeau was born at Le Bignon, near Nemours, the eldest surviving son of the economist Victor de Riqueti, marquis de Mirabeau, and his wife Marie-Geneviève de Vassan. He was also the fifth child and second son of the couple. When he was three years old, a virulent attack of smallpox left his face disfigured. This, combined with Mirabeau's resemblance to his maternal ancestors and his fondness for his mother, contributed to his father's dislike of him. At the age of five, his father had him sent to the strict boarding school of Abbé Choquart in Paris by the false name of "Pierre-Buffière" after an estate possessed by his mother. Destined for the army, at age eighteen, he entered the military school in Paris in the regiment of Berri-Cavaleria at Saints. Of this school, which had Joseph-Louis Lagrange for its professor of mathematics, there is an amusing account in the life of Gilbert Elliot, who met Mirabeau there. On leaving school in 1767, he received a commission in a cavalry regiment that his grandfather had commanded years before.

Mirabeau's love affairs are well-known, owing to the celebrity of the letters to Marie Thérèse de Monnier, his "Sophie". In spite of his disfigurement (or perhaps because of it), he won the heart of the lady to whom his colonel was attached; this led to such scandal that his father obtained a lettre de cachet, and Mirabeau was imprisoned in the Île de Ré. On being released, the young nobleman obtained leave to accompany the French expedition to Corsica as a volunteer. During the Corsican expedition, Mirabeau contracted several more gambling debts and engaged in another scandalous love affair. However, he proved his military genius in the Corsican expedition, and also conducted a thorough study of the island during his stay. The study was most likely factually incorrect, but his desire to learn of a country that had been previously unstudied emphasizes Mirabeau's endless curiosity and inquisitiveness, particularly into the traditions and customs of society. Mirabeau learned the value of hard work in the French army. This aspect of Mirabeau's personality contributed to his popular success in later years, during the Revolution. After his return, he tried to keep on good terms with his father, and in 1772 he married a rich heiress, Marie–Marquerite–Emilie de Covet, daughter of the marquis de Marignane. Emilie, who was 18 years old, was apparently engaged to a much older nobleman, the Comte de Valbelle. Nonetheless, Mirabeau pursued her for several months, expecting that their marriage would benefit from the money that the couple would receive from their parents. After several months of failed attempts at being introduced to the heiress, Mirabeau bribed one of the young lady's maids to let him into her residence, where he pretended to have had a sexual encounter with Emilie. To avoid losing face, her father saw that they got married just a couple of days afterwards. Mirabeau received a small allowance of 6,000 livres from his father, but never received the expected dowry from the marquis.

Mirabeau, who was still facing financial trouble and increasing debt, could not keep up with the expensive lifestyle to which his wife was accustomed, and their extravagances forced his father to send him into semi-exile in the country, where he wrote his earliest extant work, the Essai sur le despotisme. The couple had a son who died early, mostly due to the poor living conditions they were experiencing at that time.

Mirabeau's violent disposition led him to quarrel with a country gentleman who had insulted his sister, and his exile was changed by lettre de cachet into imprisonment in the Château d'If in 1774. In 1775 he was transferred to the castle of Joux, where he was not closely confined, having full leave to enter the town of Pontarlier. In a house of a friend he met Marie Thérèse de Monnier, known as "Sophie", and the two fell in love. He escaped to Switzerland, where Sophie joined him; they then went to the United Provinces, where he lived by writing hack work for the booksellers; meanwhile Mirabeau had been condemned to death at Pontarlier for sedition and abduction, and in May 1777 he was seized by the Dutch police, sent to France and imprisoned by a lettre de cachet in the castle of Vincennes.

The early part of his confinement is marked by indecent letters to Sophie (first published in 1793 by Pierre Louis Manuel), and the obscene Erotica biblion and Ma conversion. In Vincennes, he met the Marquis de Sade, who was also writing erotic works; however the two disliked each other intensely. It was in these writings, however, that Mirabeau developed experience as an orator. He learned how to curb his natural loquacity and his rhetoric became firm, commanding and moving. The prison in which he was held was the first platform to hear his voice. Later during his confinement, he wrote Des Lettres de Cachet et des prisons d'état, published after his liberation (1782). It exhibits an accurate knowledge of French constitutional history, skillfully marshaled to demonstrate that the system of lettres de cachet was not only philosophically unjust but constitutionally illegal. It shows, though in a rather diffuse and declamatory form, wide historical knowledge, keen philosophical perception, and genuine eloquence, applied to a practical purpose, which was the great characteristic of Mirabeau, both as a political thinker and as a statesman.

His wife asked for judicial separation in 1782. She was defended by Jean-Étienne-Marie Portalis, who later became one of the editors of the Civil Code. Mirabeau defended his own cause in this trial but lost, holding resentment against Portalis forever.

== Before the French Revolution ==
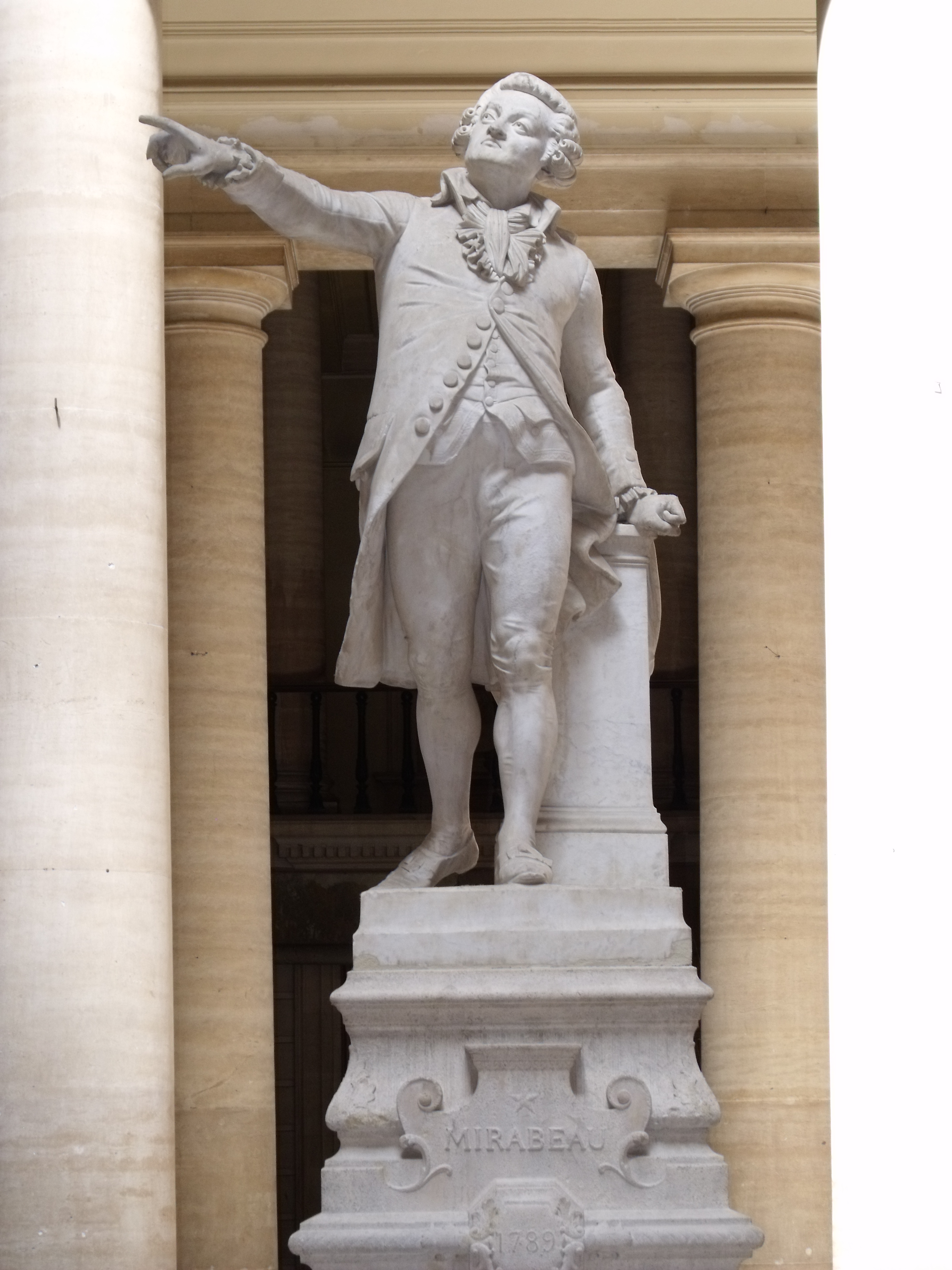
Statue of Honoré de Mirabeau. Palais de justice d'Aix-en-Provence

His release from Vincennes in August 1782 began the second period of Mirabeau's life. Mirabeau not only succeeded in reversing the sentence of death against him, but also got an order for Sophie's husband to pay the costs of the whole legal proceedings. It was thought Mirabeau would come out of the lawsuit in Aix ruined: his past convictions in prison, scandalous relationships with women, and the bad relationship with his father the Marquis all gave him a terrible reputation among judges and adversaries. However, despite being condemned by the judge, his reputation was greatly enhanced in the eyes of the public. He had withered his opponents, crushed the opposing lawyer and turned the cards in his favor regarding the death sentence. From this day forward, Mirabeau became regarded as a man of the people. Upon his release, he found that his Sophie had consoled herself with a young officer, after whose death she had committed suicide. From Pontarlier he went to Aix-en-Provence, where he claimed the court's order said that his wife should return to him. She naturally objected, and he finally lost in the third appeal of the case when Emilie's father produced to the court compromising letters from Mirabeau addressed to the marquess. Mirabeau then intervened in the suit between his father and mother before the parlement of Paris and attacked the ruling powers so violently that he had to leave France and return to the Dutch Republic, where he tried to live by writing. For a period he was employed by the publisher Marc-Michel Rey.

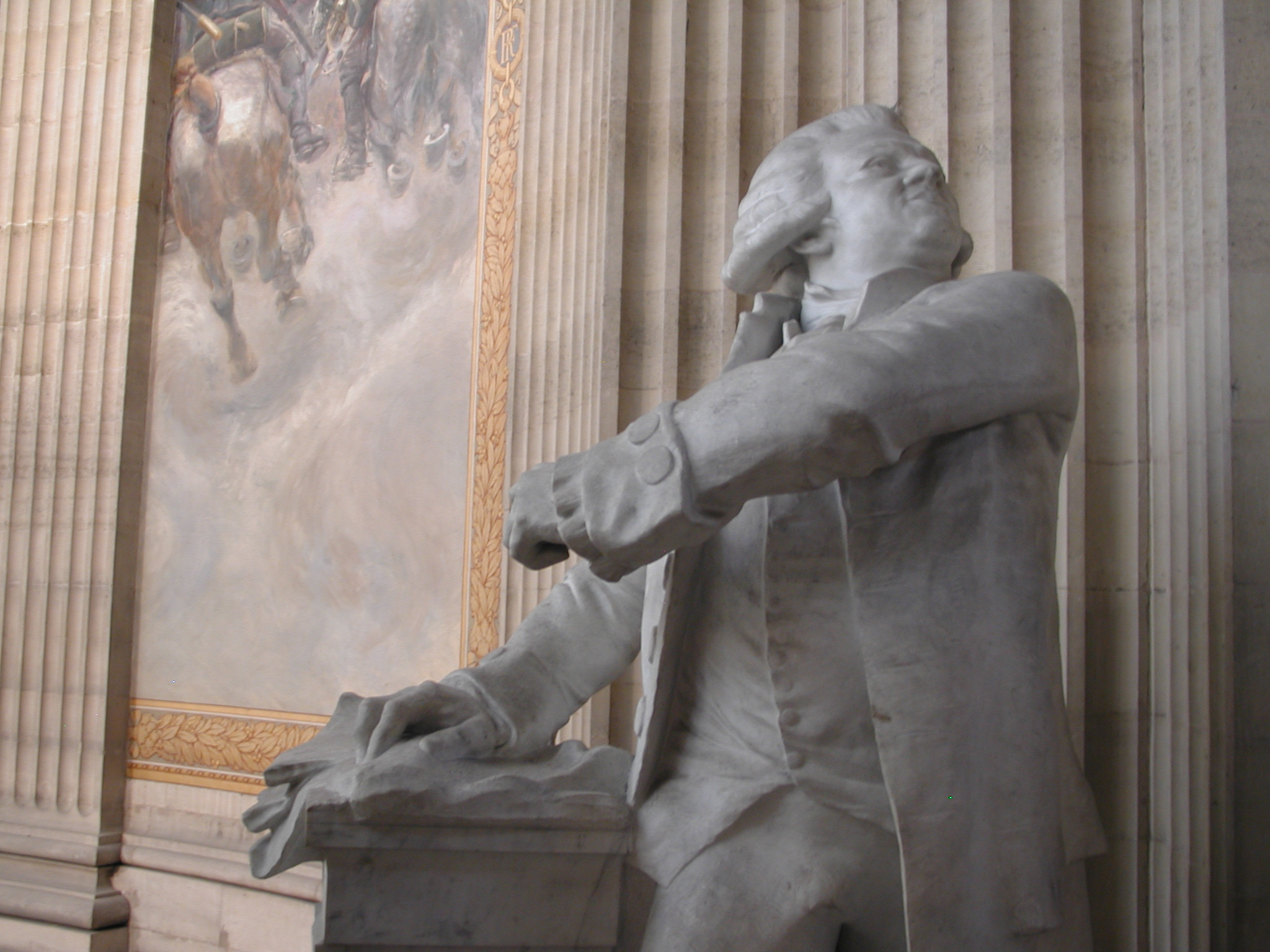
Statue of Mirabeau at the Panthéon

About this time he met Madame de Nehra, the daughter of Willem van Haren, a Dutch statesman and political writer. She was an educated, refined woman capable of appreciating Mirabeau's good points. His life was strengthened by the love of Mme de Nehra, his adopted son, Lucas de Montigny, and his little dog Chico. Following a period spent in the Dutch Republic he went to England, where his treatise on lettres de cachet was much admired after it was translated into English in 1787. He was soon admitted into the leading Whig literary and political in of London through his old school friend Gilbert Elliot, who had become a leading Whig MP. Of all his English friends, none seem to have been as close to him as Lord Shelburne and Sir Samuel Romilly. Romilly was introduced to Mirabeau by Sir Francis D'Ivernois, who undertook the translation of Mirabeau's Considérations sur l'ordre de Cincinnatus into English.

The Considérations was one of several works that Mirabeau wrote in the year 1785, and it is a good specimen of his method. He had read a pamphlet published in America attacking the order, founded in 1783 as a bond of association between officers who had served in the Continental Army. The arguments struck him as true and valuable, so he rearranged them in his own fashion, and rewrote them in his own oratorical style. He supplemented the work with materials provided personally by Benjamin Franklin, who shared Mirabeau's opinions on the topic, but was not in a position to criticize the "noble order" espoused by the Society of the Cincinnati directly, because he was serving as the United States Minister to France at the time.

Several other pamphlets Mirabeau wrote in 1785 attacked financial speculation. Among those, De La Caisse d'Escompte was prescient in that it correctly predicted the risky nature and ultimate demise of the French "Discount Bank." This book, which condemned the fiscal politics of the state, including the Caisse d'Escompte, as going against the interest of the public, was among the influential literature critical of the French government in the years leading up to the French Revolution.

He soon found that such work did not pay enough to keep his retinue, and so he sought employment from the French foreign office, either as a writer or a diplomat. He first sent Mme de Nehra to Paris to make peace with the authorities, and then returned himself with hopes of getting a job through an old literary collaborateur of his, Durival, who was at this time director of finance at the department of foreign affairs. One of this official's functions was to subsidize political pamphleteers, and Mirabeau hoped to be so employed. However, he ruined his chances with a series of writings on financial questions.

On his return to Paris he had become acquainted with Étienne Clavière, the Genevese exile, and a banker named Panchaud. From them he learnt about the abuse of stock-jobbing, and seizing their ideas he began to regard stock-jobbing, or agiotage (known in English as "arbitrage"), as the source of all evil, and to attack in his usual vehement style the Banque de St-Charles and the Compagnie des Eaux. This pamphlet brought him into controversy with Pierre Beaumarchais, who certainly did not get the best of it, but it lost him any chance of employment with the government.

His abilities were too great, however, to be overlooked by the foreign minister Charles Gravier, Comte de Vergennes. After a preliminary trip to Berlin in early 1786, he was dispatched that July on a mission to the royal court of Prussia. Upon his return in January, Mirabeau published a full account in his Secret History of the Court of Berlin (1787). This account denounced the Prussian court as scandalous and corrupt, described the dying King Frederick the Great as weak and overly emotional, and labeled Prince Henry of Prussia, brother of Frederick the Great and a guest of the French court, as narrow-minded and incompetent. He also wrote contemptuously of Prussia's principal ministers Ewald Friedrich, Count von Hertzberg, and Joachim von Blumenthal. The resulting uproar was an extreme embarrassment for the French government, which quickly censored the book, but could not prevent its widespread notoriety. Mirabeau's episode provided inspiration to many more radical publishers who came to regard Mirabeau as a leader of the coming revolution.

During his journey to Germany, he had made the acquaintance of Jakob Mauvillon, an expert on Prussia whose expertise Mirabeau made use of in his De la monarchie prussienne sous Frédéric le Grand (London, 1788). In 1788, Mirabeau was approached and asked to offer himself as a candidate for secretary to the Assembly of Notables, which the King Louis XVI had just convened as a method to circumvent the opposition of the parlements to crown initiatives seeking to reform France's tax structure. His chance to be a leading voice in France as it faced political ferment seemed to be fading as he turned down the crown offer, explaining his reasoning in a letter of 18 April 1788 to the minister Montmorin. In this affair he had sought to bring his name before the public by publishing another financial work, the Dénonciation de l'agiotage, however, it had contained diatribes that harmed his chance to serve as secretary, and led him to retire to Tongeren. He further injured his prospects by publishing the reports he had sent back to France during his secret mission to Berlin. But 1789 was at hand; the Estates-General was summoned, and the French Revolution broke out soon afterward. As a result, Mirabeau was able to exploit a completely new set of political circumstances to exponentially expand his political influence.

== French Revolution ==
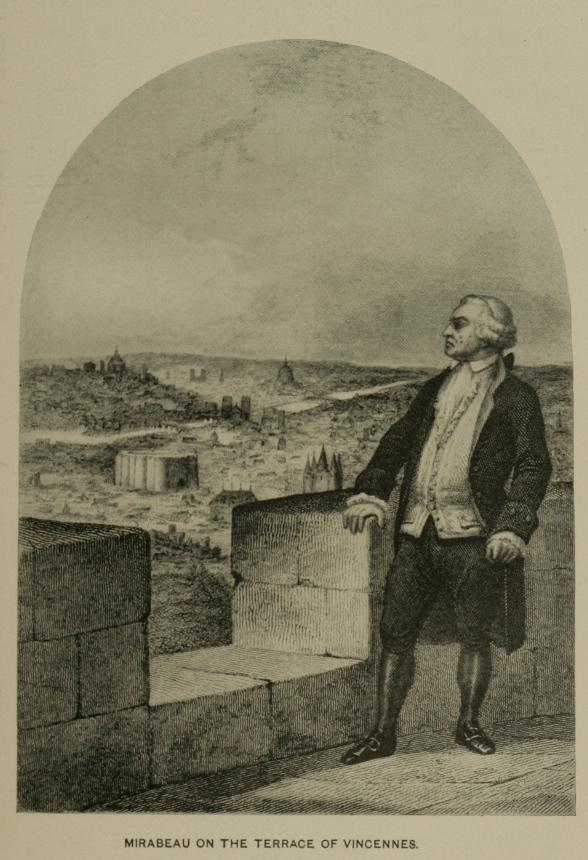
Sketch of Mirabeau on the terrace of the Château de Vincennes

=== 1789 ===
On hearing of the king's decision to summon the Estates-General, Mirabeau went to Provence, and offered to assist at the preliminary conference of the nobility of his district (the local representatives of the Second Estate), but was rejected. He appealed instead to the Third Estate and was elected to the Estates-General in both Aix and Marseille. He chose to accept the seat for Aix, and was present at the opening of the Estates-General on 4 May 1789 (also his brother, André Boniface was a deputy but elected by the nobility). From this time onward, Mirabeau took a very prominent role in the deliberations of the National Constituent Assembly.

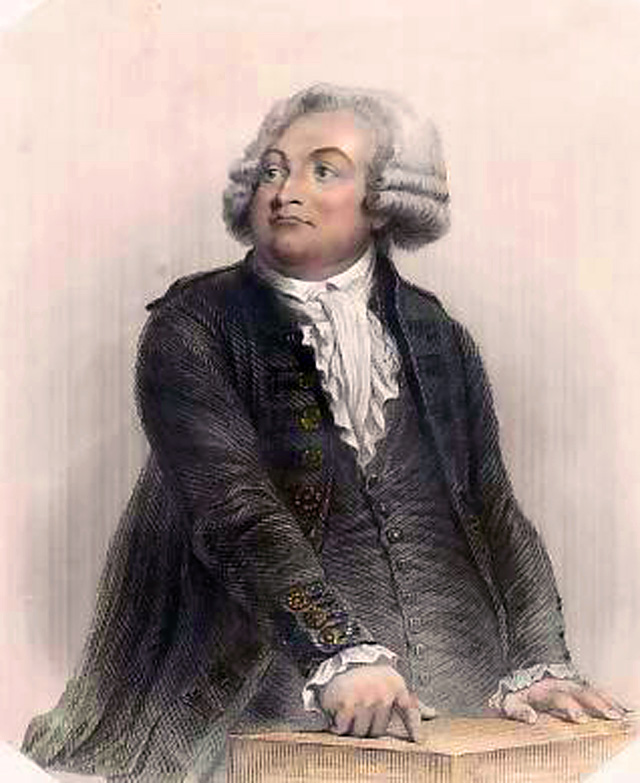
"Mirabeau, deputy of the Third Estate" by Hopwood after Auguste Raffet, 1847

Among a large crowd of unfamiliar politicians in the Estates General, Mirabeau was one figure who stood out. He was widely known to the French public, and not only did the people place great faith in him, they feared him. His great capacity for work and extensive knowledge were easily seen, but the scandals of his private life with women, time in prison, and extensive debt could not be overlooked. At every important crisis his voice was heard, though his advice was not always followed. He possessed both logical acuity and passionate enthusiasm. From the beginning, he recognized that government should exist to allow the population to pursue its daily work in peace, and that for a government to be successful it must be strong. At the same time, he thoroughly understood that for a government to be strong, it must be in harmony with the wishes of the majority of the people. He had studied the British Westminster system, and he hoped to establish in France a system similar in principle, yet still distinct. In the first stages of the meetings of the Estates-General, Mirabeau was soon recognized as a leader, because he always knew his own mind and was prompt in emergencies. He is attributed with the successful consolidation of the National Assembly out of the membership of the Estates-General. During the royal session of 23 June 1789 of the National Assembly, Mirabeau replied to the king's envoy who had come to bring the order to dissolve this Assembly : "Tell those who send you that we are here by the will of the people and will leave only by the force of bayonets !"

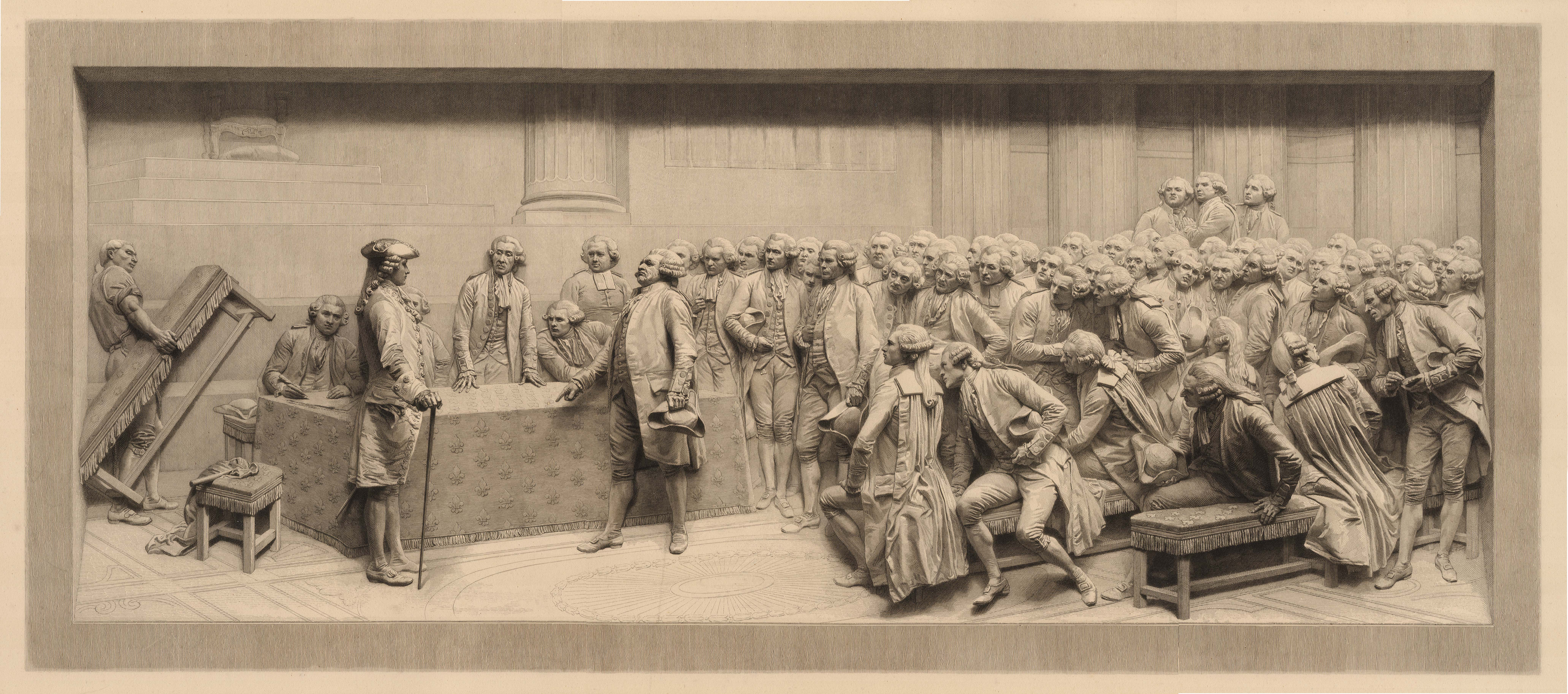
Mirabeau's reply to the Master of Ceremonies on 23 June 1789 by Alphonse Lamotte after Jules Dalou

After the storming of the Bastille on 14 July 1789, Mirabeau warned the Assembly of the futility of passing fine-sounding decrees and urged the necessity of action. Although the cause of liberty had triumphed, Mirabeau foresaw that the intervention of armed mobs would only drive the path of Revolution further and further along a destructive path of violence. He declared that the night of 4 August (when members of the Constituent Assembly took an oath to end feudalism) accomplished nothing other than to give the people immense theoretical liberty while providing them no practical freedom and overthrowing the old régime before a new one could be constituted. His failure to control the theorists demonstrated to Mirabeau that his eloquence could not enable him to guide the Assembly by himself, and that he must get additional support. He wished to establish a strong ministry in the manner of the British ministries. He argued that the new ministry should create an assembly chosen to represent the French people better than how Britain's House of Commons represented the British public.

According to a story contained in the Mémoires of the duchesse d'Abrantes, Mirabeau's first thought of becoming a minister can be traced to May 1789, when Queen Marie Antoinette allegedly tried to bribe him. He refused the bribe, but expressed his wish to be a minister. The indignation with which the queen rejected the idea may have made him consider the Duke of Orléans, a cousin of Louis XVI, as a possible constitutional king, because his title would of necessity be parliamentary. But the weakness of the Duke of Orléans was too palpable, and Mirabeau expressed his utter contempt for him. He also attempted to form an alliance with the Marquis de la Fayette, but the two could not agree on a personal level, and Lafayette had his own theories about a new French constitution. Mirabeau tried for a time to act with Jacques Necker, the French finance minister, and obtained the sanction of the Assembly for Necker's financial scheme, not because it was good, but because, as he said, "no other plan was before them, and something must be done."

The Comte de la Marck was a close friend of the queen, and had been elected a member of the Estates-General. His acquaintance with Mirabeau, begun in 1788, ripened during the following year into a friendship, which La Marck hoped to turn to the advantage of the court. After The March on Versailles of 5 October 1789, he consulted Mirabeau as to what measures the king ought to take, and Mirabeau, delighted at the opportunity, drew up his recommendations. His Mémoire offers insight into Mirabeau's genius for politics. The main position was that the king was not free in Paris; he must therefore depart Paris for a provincial capital in the French interior, and there he must appeal to the people and summon a great convention. It would be ruin to appeal to the nobility, as the queen advised. At this great convention the king must show himself ready to recognize that great changes had taken place, that feudalism and absolutism had forever disappeared, and that a new relationship between king and people must arise, which must be loyally observed on both sides in the future. To establish this new constitutional position between king and people would not be difficult, because the indivisibility of the monarch and his people is anchored in the heart of the French people.

This was Mirabeau's programme, from which he never diverged, but which was far too statesmanlike to be understood by the king, and far too assertive of the altered condition of the monarchy to be palatable to the queen. Mirabeau followed up his Mémoire with a scheme for a great ministry containing all the most notable men: Necker would be prime minister, "to render him as powerless as he is incapable, and yet preserve his popularity for the king"; the Duc de la Rochefoucauld; La Marck; Charles Maurice de Talleyrand, Bishop of Autun; Mirabeau, without portfolio; Gui-Jean-Baptiste Target, mayor of Paris; Lafayette, as generalissimo of the army; Louis Philippe, comte de Ségur, as foreign minister; Jean Joseph Mounier; and Isaac René Guy le Chapelier.

This scheme was leaked, then ruined by a decree of the Assembly of 7 November 1789, such that no member of the Assembly could become a minister. This decree destroyed any chance of the sort of harmony between ministers and parliament that existed in England and dashed Mirabeau's hopes. The queen utterly refused to take Mirabeau's counsel saying, "I hope that we shall never sink so low that we shall have to ask for aid from Mirabeau.", and La Marck left Paris. However, in April 1790, La Marck was suddenly recalled by the comte de Mercy-Argenteau, the Austrian ambassador to Paris, and became the queen's most trusted political adviser. From this time to Mirabeau's death, he was the bearer of almost daily communications between Mirabeau and the queen. Mirabeau at first attempted to make an alliance with Lafayette, but it was useless, for Lafayette was not a strong man himself.

Besides his schemes to become a minister, Mirabeau also assisted the Assembly in drafting civil rights legislation. In August 1789, he played an important role in drafting the Declaration of the Rights of Man and of the Citizen.

=== 1790–1791 ===
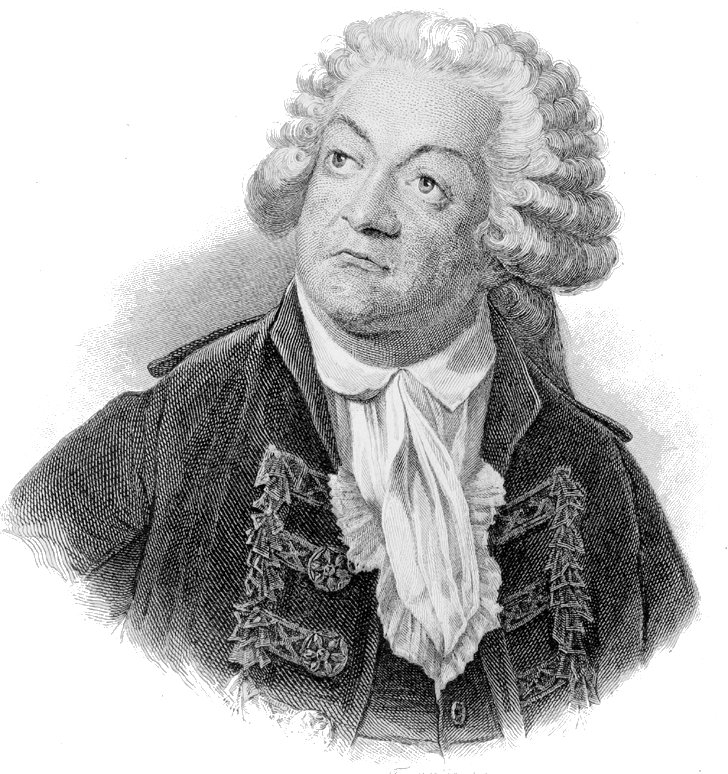
Mirabeau

In June 1790, Mirabeau met the captive Queen Marie Antoinette in Saint Cloud, where she was less watched and confined than in Paris (where her jailers followed her every step, even in her bedroom). Mirabeau retained a close connection with the queen, and drew up many state papers for her. In return, the king used money from Austria to secretly pay his debts and provide him with a monthly allowance of six thousand livres, with promises of a million or more. Some historians argue Mirabeau was not the traitor that many believed him to be because he continued to uphold his political beliefs and tried to make possible a bridge between the king and the revolutionaries.

Mirabeau focused his efforts on two main issues: changing the ministry and dealing with impending civil war. His attempts to form political alliances with Lafayette and Necker failed and resulted in open hostility. Necker disappeared from the French court after September 1790 and no longer posed a threat. Lafayette, however, was very powerful due to his control of the military and the National Guard. At first, Mirabeau attempted to undermine Lafayette's power, but decided to solve the problem of the ministry, and maintain stability, by removing all ministers and placing the ministry entirely under Lafayette. In effect, Mirabeau suggested that the king distance himself from politics and let the revolution run its course, because it would inevitably destroy itself through its contradictory nature. Furthermore, Mirabeau proposed that, if his plan should fail, Paris should no longer be the capital of France, showing a conservative line of thinking: the only way to end the revolution would be to destroy its place of birth. In a meeting with the king and queen, Mirabeau maintained that not only was civil war inevitable, it was necessary for the survival of the monarchy. Mirabeau believed that the decision to go to war, even civil war, must come only from the king. In a letter of confidence to Mirabeau, Louis wrote that, as a Christian king, he could not declare war on his own subjects. However, that would not stop him from reacting in kind if his subjects declared war first. In order to avoid provoking a civil war, the king refrained from confronting the Constituent Assembly, and hoped instead for a constitution that he could agree to. Once the Civil Constitution of the Clergy of 1790 destroyed this hope, Louis adopted a strategy of strengthening royal authority and the church's position, and accepted the use of force to accomplish this. Mirabeau's involvement with the court is as interesting for the insights it provides into the mind of Louis XVI as it is for the effects it produced in the Revolution.

On the question of the royal veto, Mirabeau took a practical view and, seeing that the royal power was already considerably weakened, declared for the king's absolute veto and against the suspensive veto. He knew from his knowledge of British history that such a veto would be impractical unless the king knew the people were on his side, and that if it were used unjustifiably, the power of the purse possessed by the representatives of the people could bring about a bloodless revolution. The difference between the suspensive veto and the absolute was simple: the absolute veto gave the king the power to stop any law for an indefinite period of time. The suspensive veto, on the other hand, put limitations on the powers of the king. The final compromise was to allow the king a suspensive veto for a period of two years.

On the subject of peace and war, Mirabeau supported the king's authority with some success. Again, almost alone in the Assembly, he held that the soldier ceased to be a citizen when he became a soldier; he must submit to the deprivation of his liberty to think and act and must recognize that a soldier's first duty is obedience. With such sentiments, it is no wonder that he approved of the vigorous conduct of the marquis de Bouillé at Nancy, which was to his credit, as Bouillé was opposed to him.

Lastly, in matters of finance, he attacked Necker's "caisse d'escompte", which was to have the whole control of the taxes, as usurping the Assembly's power of the purse, and heartily approved of the system of assignats, with the reservation that the issue should be limited to no more than one-half the value of the lands to be sold.

He saw that much of the National Assembly's inefficiency arose from the members' inexperience and their incurable verbosity. To establish some system of rules, he requested Romilly to draw up a detailed account of the rules and customs of the British House of Commons, which he translated into French, but which the Assembly refused to use.

=== Jacobin Club ===
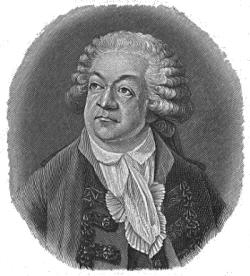
Comte de Mirabeau, H. F. Helmolt (ed.): History of the World. New York, 1901.

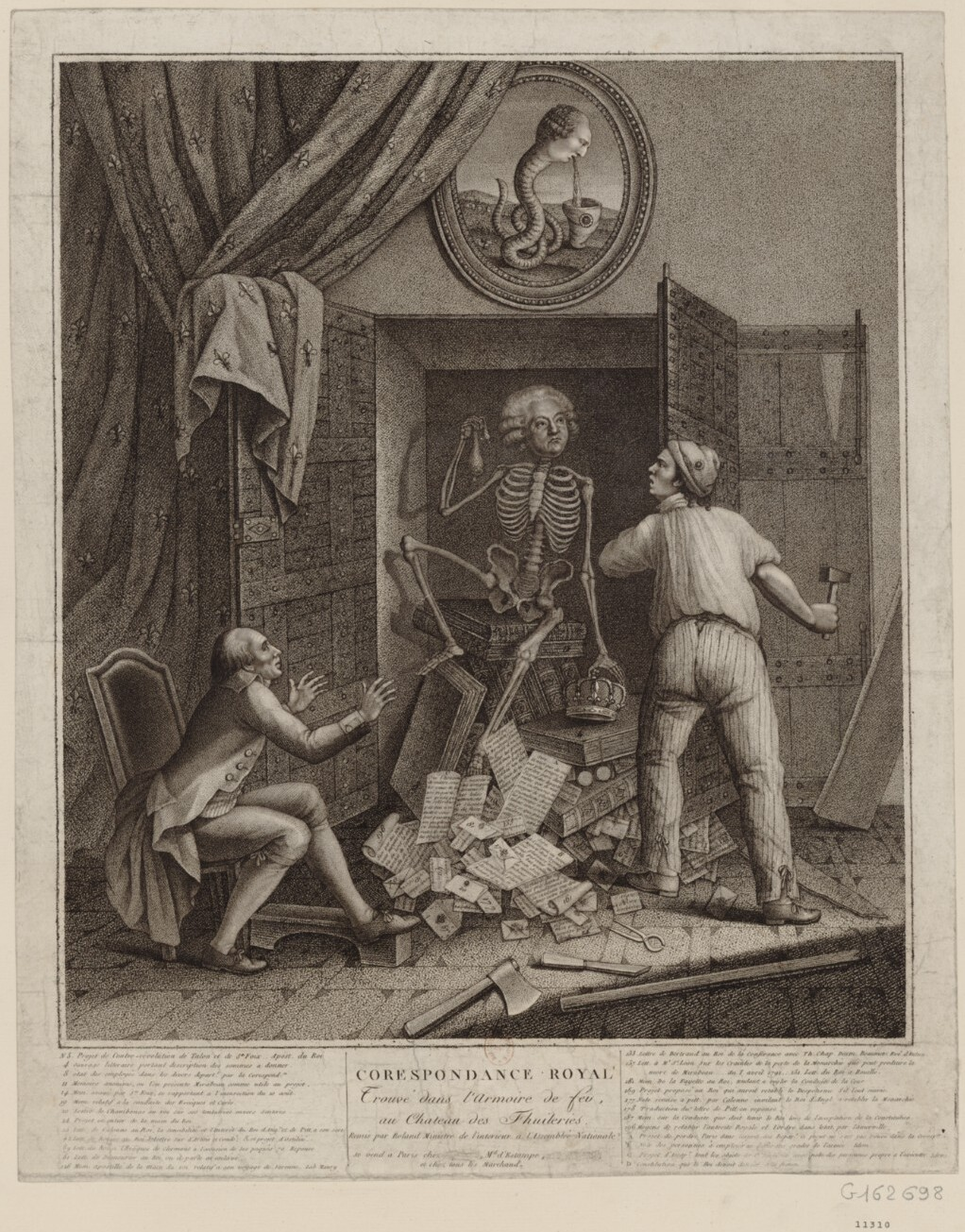
1792 caricature of Mirabeau's skeleton coming out of Louis XVI's armoire de fer

In addition to his place in the National Assembly, Mirabeau also served as a member of the Jacobin Club until his death. However, historian Charles Kuhlmann believed that "he was a Jacobin in name only and regarded the society as one of the chief obstacles in the way of his plans for the restoration of royal authority." In the end, the Jacobins would stand in his way of restoring royal authority, but in the early years of the revolution, Mirabeau was actually a leading figure in the Jacobin Club. Mirabeau reached the height of his influence within the club when he was elected its president in December 1790.

During his time in the Jacobin Club, he would have a lasting impact on the selling of church land, the slave trade, and the determination of which citizens could serve in the National Guard. Mirabeau argued for the selling of church lands to private individuals in order to rescue the country from its financial troubles. This argument would be strongly supported by his fellow Jacobins. Although Mirabeau argued for the abolition of slavery, it must be said that, "in spite of their oft-expressed devotion for liberty and equality, the clubs long remained indifferent to the horrors of slavery and the slave trade" until later in the revolution, after Mirabeau's death. As for the National Guard, the National Assembly passed a decree on 6 December 1790 stating that only active citizens could serve on the National Guard. Due to "an article of the electoral law of October, 1789, only persons whose annual tax amounted to the equivalent of three days' work were recognized as active citizens," leaving the decree of 6 December to restrict the right to bear arms to the middle and upper classes.

The decree of 6 December led to heated debates within the clubs of the Jacobins, especially in Paris. It also pitted Maximilien Robespierre, a rising political figure, against Mirabeau. The evening after the decree was passed, Robespierre would attempt to give a speech against the decree at the Jacobins club in Paris only to be stopped by Mirabeau. He "attempted to stop him on the grounds that no one was allowed to challenge a decree already rendered" by the National Assembly; however, after an hour and a half of uproar Robespierre was allowed to finish. Historians believe that Mirabeau tried to stop Robespierre because he had begun to notice the change in the revolution to a more radical form led by the radical members of the Jacobin party. Mirabeau would serve as a member of the more moderate group called the Société des amis de la Révolution de Paris, which was formed in November 1789. This group would disappear by 1790 due to conflict within the Jacobin Club.

After Mirabeau's death, there would be no greater place of mourning than in the Jacobin Clubs throughout Paris. It is said that at "Alençon tears ran from every eye and members fainted" over hearing the news of his death. The mourning of Mirabeau as a Jacobin hero would not last long, however. After the deposing of the monarchy in 1792, the French republic would find letters in an iron chest written by Mirabeau to the king about trying to save the monarchy. This would lead to the destruction of his bust in the Jacobin Club and to his denunciation by Robespierre as "an intriguer and political charlatan unworthy of the honor of lying in the Pantheon."

==== Foreign affairs ====
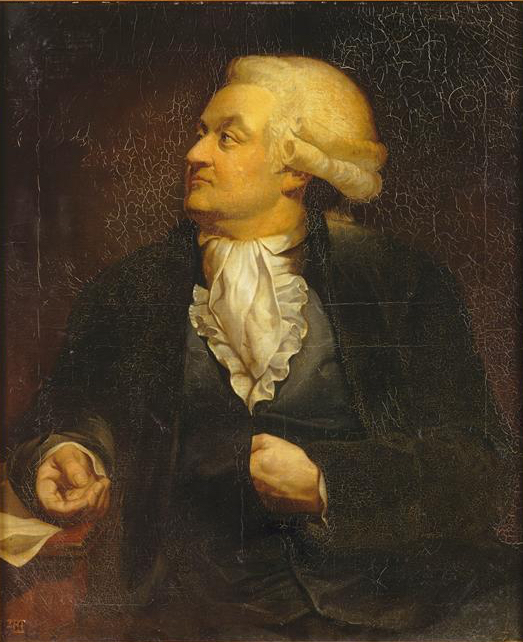
"Portrait of Honoré-Gabriel Riqueti" by Philippe-Auguste Jeanron, 1840

In foreign affairs, he held that the French people should conduct their revolution as they wished, and that no foreign nation had any right to interfere with the country's internal affairs. But he knew that neighboring nations were disturbed by the progress of the revolution, feared its influence on their own peoples, and that foreign monarchs were being importuned by French émigrés to intervene on behalf of the French monarchy. To prevent this intervention, or rather to give no pretext for it, was the guiding principle in his foreign policy. He was elected a member of the comité diplomatique of the Assembly in July 1790, and in this capacity he was able to prevent the Assembly from doing much harm with regard to foreign affairs. He had long known Armand Marc, comte de Montmorin, the foreign secretary, and, as matters became more strained, he entered into daily communication with the minister, advising him on every point, and, while dictating his policy, defended it in the Assembly. Mirabeau's exertions in this respect showed him to be a statesman; his influence is best demonstrated by the confused state of affairs in this area after his death.

== Death ==
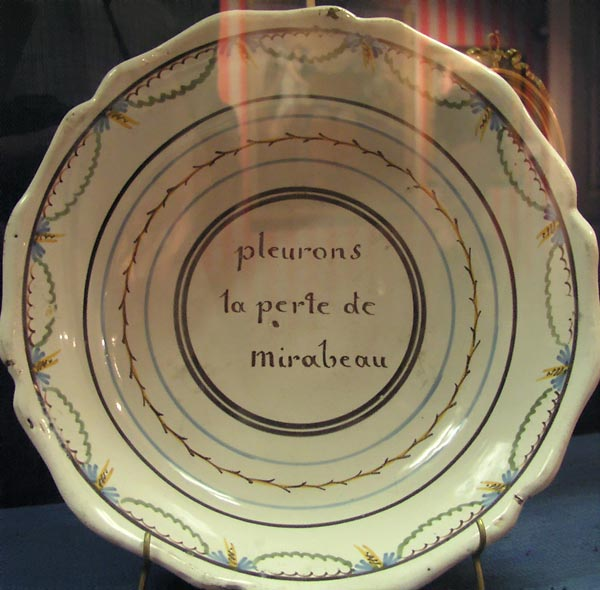
"Let us weep for the loss of Mirabeau": commemorative plate, c.1791 (Carnavalet Museum, Paris)

Mirabeau's health had been damaged by the excesses of his youth and his strenuous work in politics, and in 1791, he contracted pericarditis. With the continuous medical attention paid to him by his friend and physician Pierre Jean George Cabanis, Mirabeau survived to perform his duties as president of the National Assembly until his death on 2 April 1791 in Paris. Even close to the end, he directed debates with eloquence that further increased his popularity. The people of Paris cherished him as one of the fathers of the Revolution. During the trial of Louis XVI in 1792, Mirabeau's dealings with the royal court were brought to light, and he was largely discredited by the public after it became known that he had secretly acted as an intermediary between the monarchy and the revolutionaries and had taken payment for it. Historians in the 21st century discovered secret documents in the archives of Vienna that demonstrate that the Austrian ambassador orchestrated the meetings with the king and queen. Florimond-Claude, comte de Mercy-Argenteau, the ambassador, was the queen's political advisor, with advice tailored to the needs of Austria, not France.

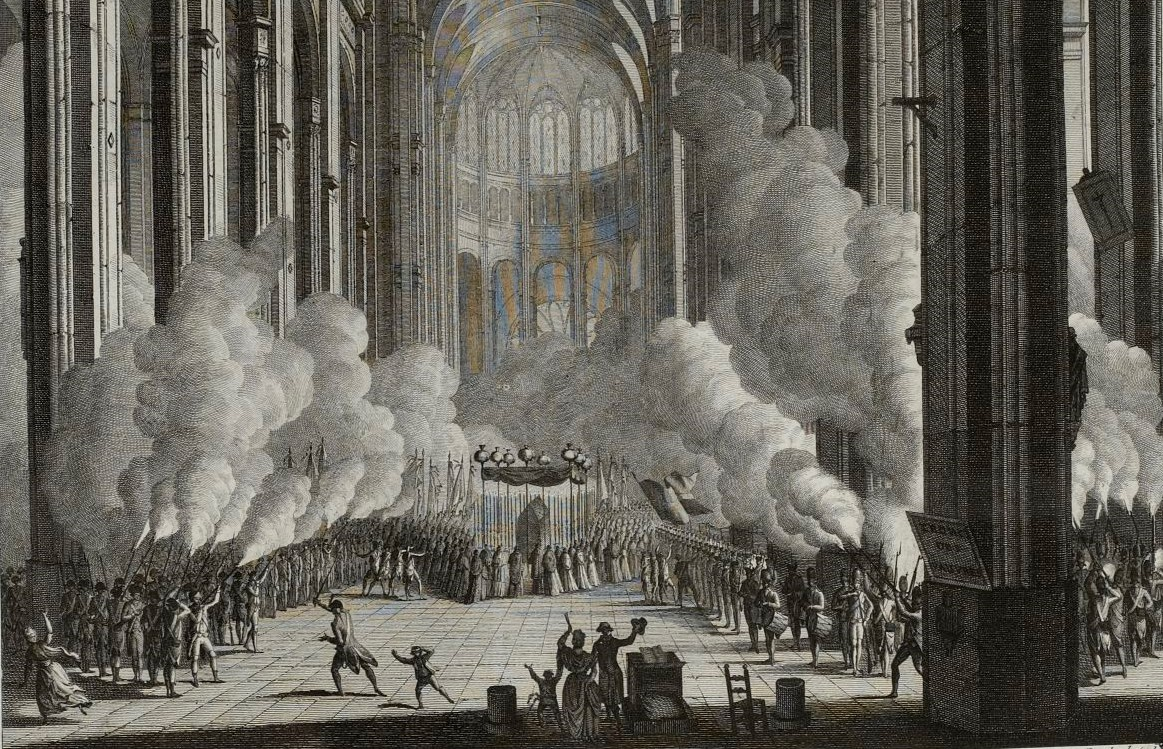
Funeral of Mirabeau in the Church of St Eustache, 4 April 1791, (Musée de la Révolution française).

He received a grand burial, and it was for him that the Panthéon in Paris was created as a burial place for great Frenchmen. The street where he died (rue de la Chaussée-d'Antin) was renamed rue Mirabeau. In 1792, his secret dealings with the king were uncovered, and in 1794 his remains were removed from the Panthéon and were replaced with those of Jean-Paul Marat. His remains were then buried anonymously in the graveyard of Clamart. In spite of searches performed in 1889, they were not found.

With Mirabeau's death the task of saving the monarchy became much more difficult, as the king was less reconciled than he had ever been with the Revolution, and thus revolutionary leaders became less willing to share power with a king who proved so unwilling to compromise. Some historians, such as François Furet, however, believe that even had he lived, there would have been a similar outcome, as it would have been extremely difficult to remake the old monarchy in harmony with the growing democratic ideals of the age.

Mirabeau proved himself as one of the strongest early leaders of the revolution. His energy captivated his audience, his leadership was often the lead of the revolutionary ideas, while his work with the king stained his image. Mirabeau's early life, though filled with the ideas of a young man revolting against a stern father, helped give him these qualities.

=== Tributes ===
Mirabeau B. Lamar, second president of The Republic of Texas and fourth United States Ambassador to Nicaragua, was named in his honor.

== Collaborators ==
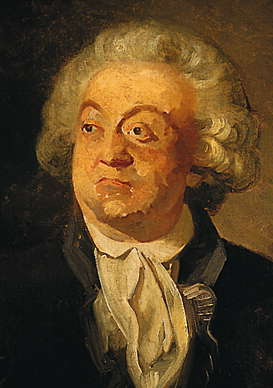
"Honoré Gabriel Riqueti de Mirabeau" by Joseph Boze, 1789

His first literary work written after the bombastic, but eloquent Essai sur le despotisme (Neufchâtel, 1775) was a translation of Robert Watson's Philip II, done in Amsterdam with the help of Nicolas-Luton Durival. His Considerations sur l'ordre de Cincinnatus (London, 1788) was based on a pamphlet by Aedanus Burke of South Carolina, who opposed the aristocratic tendencies of the Society of the Cincinnati, and the notes to it were by Gui-Jean-Baptiste Target. His financial writings were suggested by the Genevese exile Étienne Clavière.

During the Revolution, he received yet more help; men were proud to labour for him, and did not murmur because he absorbed all the credit and fame. Étienne Dumont, Clavière, Antoine-Adrien Lamourette and Étienne Salonion Reybaz were but a few of the most distinguished of his collaborators. Dumont was a Genevese exile and old friend of Romilly who willingly prepared the famous addresses that Mirabeau used to make to the Assembly marked by sudden bursts of eloquent declamation; Clavière helped him in finance and not only worked out his figures, but also wrote his financial discourses; Lamourette wrote the speeches on the Civil Constitution of the Clergy; Reybaz not only wrote for him his famous speeches on the assignats, the organization of the national guard, and others, which Mirabeau read word for word at the tribune, but also even the posthumous speech on succession to the estates of intestates, which Talleyrand read in the Assembly as the last work of his dead friend.

== In popular culture ==
Mirabeau was played by Sir Peter Ustinov in the 1989 film La Révolution française.

He was also portrayed in the popular video game Assassin's Creed Unity as the leader of the French brotherhood of Assassins.

Mirabeau also appeared as one of the characters in the Spiders 2022 game Steelrising.

== Bibliography ==
- 1776 - Essai sur le despotisme
- 1782 - Des lettres de cachet et des prisons d'état : ouvrage posthume, composé en 1778
- 1783 - Ma Conversion
- 1785 - Considérations sur l'ordre de Cincinnatus, ou imitation d'un pamphlet Anglo-Americain. Suives de plusieurs pièces relatives à cette institution
- 1785 - De la banque d'Espagne, dite de Saint-Charles
- 1785 - De la caisse d'escompte
- 1785 - Réponse du comte de Mirabeau à l'écrivain des administrateurs de la Compagnie des Eaux de Paris
- 1785 - Doutes sur la liberté de l'Escaut, réclamée par l'Empereur; sur les causes & sur les conséquences probables de cette réclamation
- 1785 - Lettre à M. Le Couteulx de la Noraye, sur la Banque de Saint-Charles et sur la Caisse-d'Escompte
- 1786 - Lettre du comte de Mirabeau à *** sur M. Mr. de Cagliostro et Lavater. Avec un apendix, ou eclaircissemens sur les theistes de Boheme, et la persecution qu ́ils ont eprouvee en 1783
- 1787 - Lettre sur l'invasion des Provinces Unies, à Mr. le Comte de Mirabeau et sa réponse
- 1787 - Dénonciation de l'agiotage, au roi et à l'Assemblée des notables
- 1788 - De la monarchie prussienne, sous Frédéric le Grand : avec une appendice contenant des recherches sur la situation actuelle des principales contrées de l'Allemagne. Tome premier; Tome second; Tome troisième; Tome quatrième; Tome cinquième; Tome sixième; Tome septième
- 1788 - Aux Bataves, sur le stathoudérat
- 1788 - Observations d'un voyageur anglais, sur la maison de force appellée Bicêtre : suivies de réflexions sur les effets de la sévérité des peines, et sur la législation criminelle de la Grande-Bretagne. Imité de l'anglais; avec une lettre de Benjamin Franklin
- 1789 - Histoire secrete de la cour de Berlin, ou correspondance d'un voyageur françois, depuis le mois de Juillet 1786 jusqu'au 19 Janvier 1787. Ouvrage posthume. Tome premier; Tome second
