= Bignon =

Bignon is a surname. Notable people with the surname include:

- Alfredo Bignon (1843–1908), French-Peruvian pharmacist and chemist
- Armand-Jérôme Bignon (1711–1772), French lawyer, royal librarian and conseiller d'État
- Jean-Paul Bignon, (1662–1743), French ecclesiastic, statesman, writer, preacher, and librarian to Louis XIV of France
- Jérôme Bignon (1589–1656), French lawyer born in Paris
- Jérôme Bignon (politician) (born 1949), member of the National Assembly of France
- Louis Bignon (1816–1906), famous French chef whose Café Riche became the most fashionable in Paris
- Louis Pierre Édouard, Baron Bignon (1771–1841), French diplomat and historian
- Michel Bignon (1891–1926), French equestrian
- Roger Bignon (born 1935), French field hockey player
- Víctor Bignon (1925–2007), Chilean boxer

== See also ==
- Le Bignon, commune in the Loire-Atlantique department in western France
- Le Bignon-du-Maine, commune in the Mayenne department in northwestern France
- Le Bignon-Mirabeau, commune in the Centre region of France
- Chevry-sous-le-Bignon, commune in the Loiret department in north-central France
- Bignon Commission (1693–1718), group established to examine the feasibility of compiling a description of arts and industrial processes in France
- Bignon Commission (French Revolution) (1793–1794), French military tribunal that terrorized Nantes during the French Revolution
- Bignona
- Bignonia
- Brignon
