= André Boniface Louis Riqueti de Mirabeau =

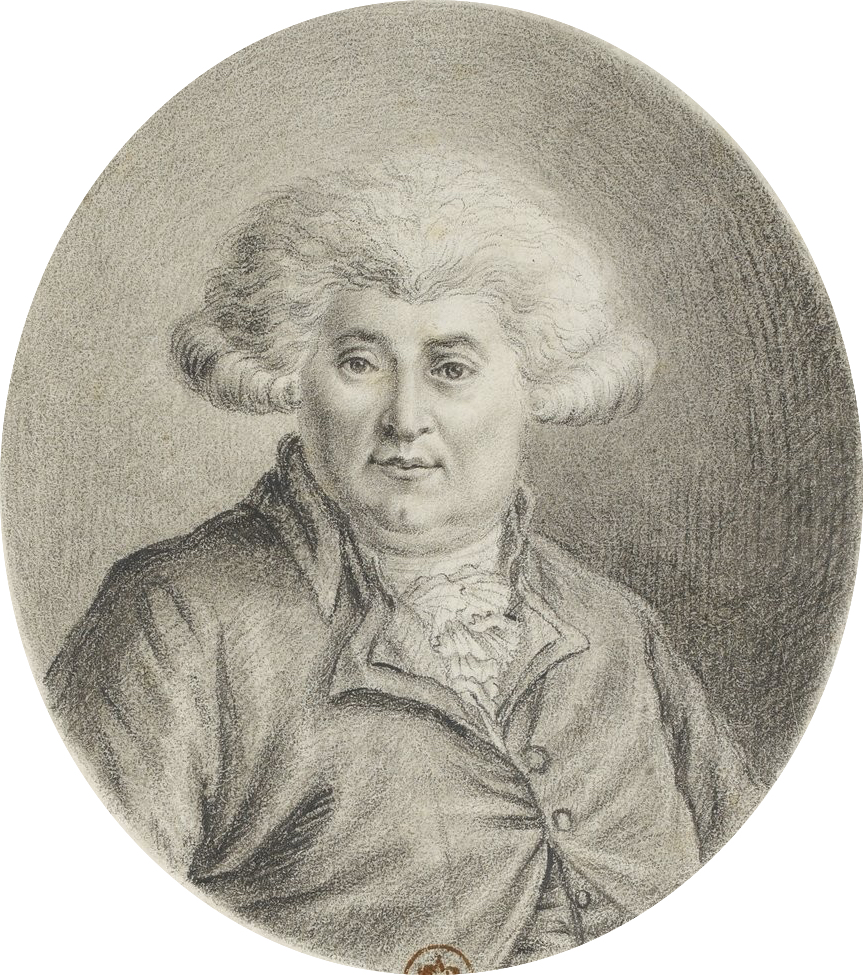

André Boniface Louis Riqueti, Vicomte de Mirabeau (30 November 1754 – 15 September 1792), son of Victor de Riqueti, marquis de Mirabeau and brother of the orator Honoré Mirabeau, was one of the reactionary leaders at the opening of the French Revolution.

== Life ==
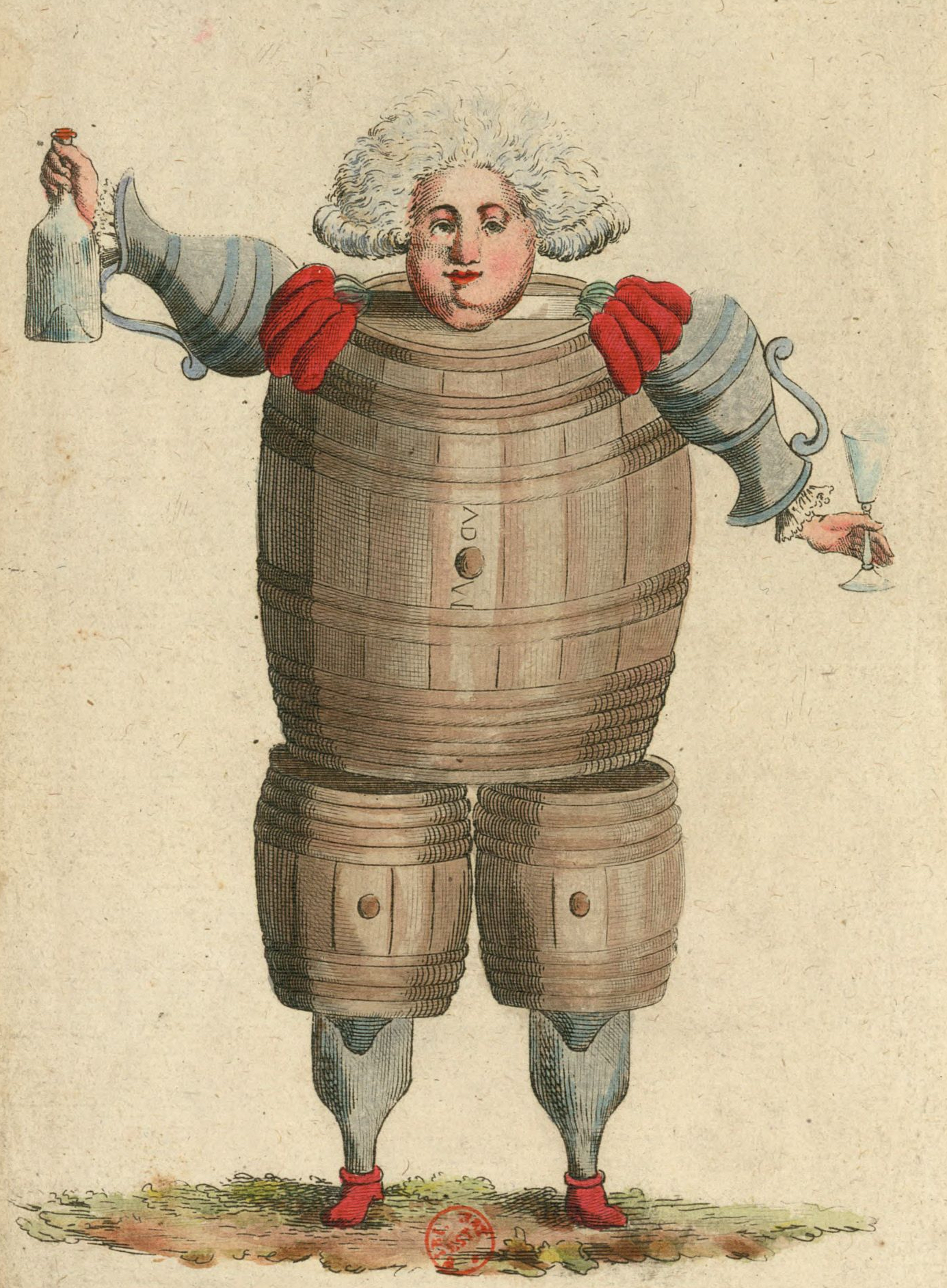
Caricature of Mirabeau.

Known as Barrel Mirabeau (Mirabeau-Tonneau) because of his "rotundity" and voluminous taste for drink, he was sent to the army in Malta in 1776, and spent part of his two years there in prison for insulting a religious procession. He served as a colonel, commanding the Touraine Regiment under the comte de Rochambeau in the American Revolution. During the war, he was in several sea-fights with the English and witnessed the Battle of Yorktown in 1781.

In the following year, he had two narrow escapes from drowning. With his debts paid up by his father, he was elected by the noblesse of Limoges a deputy to the States General. Unlike his brother, he opposed the French Revolution. He was a violent conservative and opposed everything that threatened the old régime. and in 1790 left France to join the royalist counter-revolutionary forces in Germany. He was not very successful in his efforts to form a regiment from French exiles and deserters, and died of a stroke in Freiburg two years later.

To Mirabeau is attributed a statement otherwise associated with Voltaire,

Other states possess an army; Prussia is an army which possesses a state.

He shared fully in the eccentric family pride; and boasted of his brother's genius even when bitterly opposing him. He emigrated about 1790 and raised a legion which was to bear his name; but his insolence alienated the German princes and his command was taken from him. He died in August 1792 of apoplexy or from a duel in Freiburg im Breisgau. He wrote some verse as well as various pamphlets.
