= Marie-Thérèse-Richard de Ruffey, Marquise de Monnier =

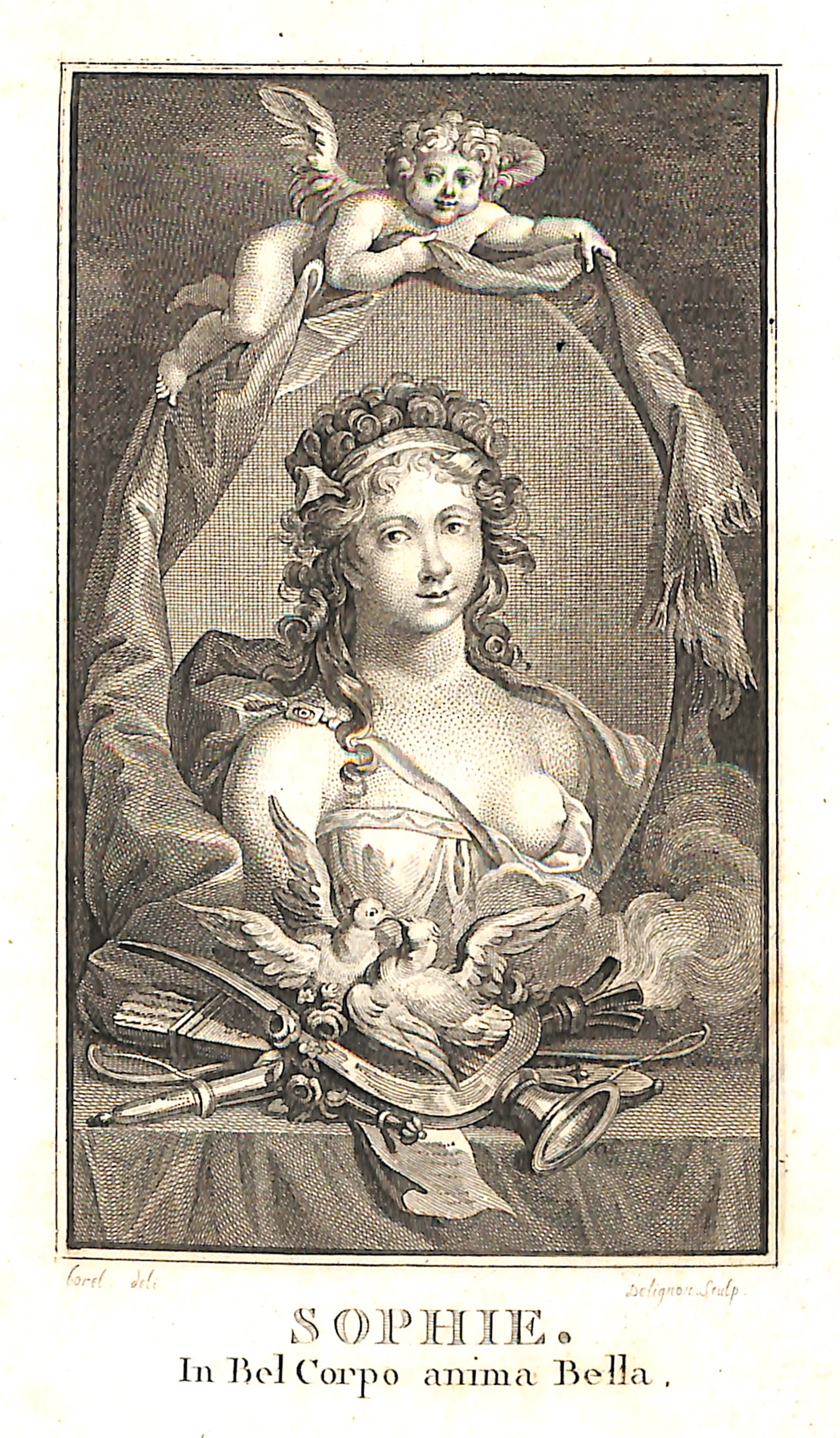
Marie Thérèse Sophie Richard de Ruffey

Marie-Thérèse-Richard de Ruffey, Marquise de Monnier (January 9, 1754 - September 8, 1789), known as Sophie was the mistress of Honoré Gabriel Riqueti, comte de Mirabeau. She was famously involved in a scandal during which she ran away with Mirabeau to Switzerland.

== Biography ==
On July 1, 1771, at the age of seventeen, Ruffey married the Marquis de Monnier, who was 49 years her senior; the marriage had been arranged by her father, Gilles-Germain-Richard de Ruffey. She met Mirabeau in 1775 in Pontarlier while he was loosely confined in the Fort of Joux. She became his mistress and when he escaped to Switzerland she followed him. From there, they went to Amsterdam, where Mirabeau sustained the household by writing for local booksellers until he was captured in 1777 and imprisoned in Vincennes, France. They had a daughter, Gabrielle Sophie, who died at the age of two.

Lettres à Sophie ("Letters to Sophie"), first published in 1793, were written by Mirabeau in confinement. After Mirabeau's release in 1781 he paid a brief secret visit to Sophie. With her agreement, he turned to politics and their relationship ended.

From 1782 Ruffey lived a quiet life in Gien. After her father's death in March 1783, she befriended Edme Benoît de Poterat, a former captain of the cavalry and lieutenant of the Marshals of France. They were planning to marry, but Poterat died of a chest disease, and Ruffey killed herself by asphyxiation on September 8, 1789, at the age of 35.
