= Roger Bignon =

French hockey player

Personal information
- Nationality: French
- Born: 12 November 1935 (age 90) Paris, France

Sport
- Sport: Field hockey

Roger Bignon (born 12 November 1935) is a French field hockey player. He competed in the men's tournament at the 1960 Summer Olympics.
