= Joseph Boze =

French portrait painter

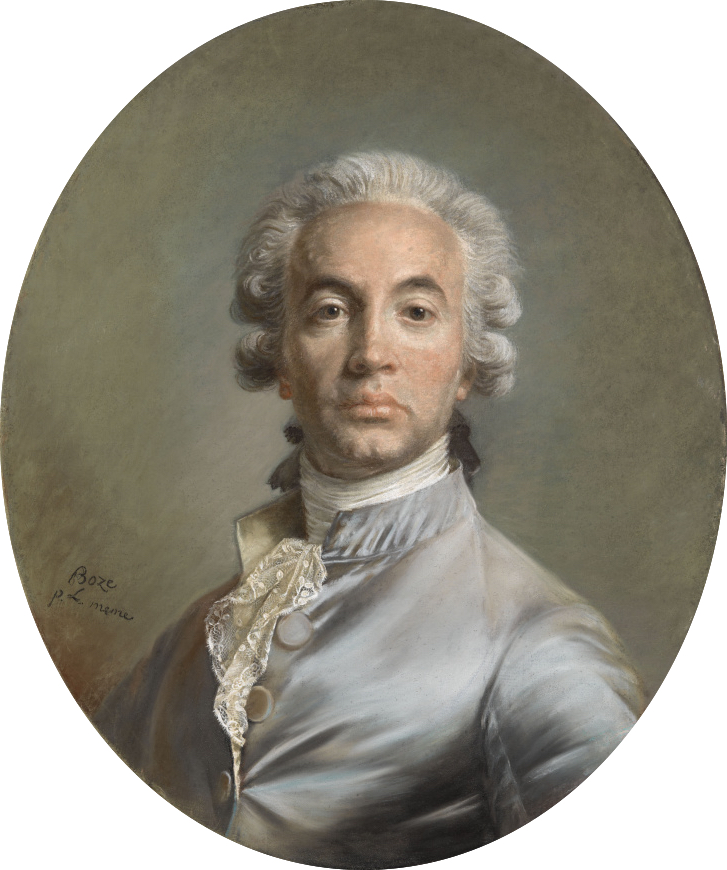
Self-portrait, 1782

Joseph Boze (7 February 1746 – 17 January 1826) was a French portrait painter and pastellist mostly active during the ancien régime and the French Revolution.

== Biography ==
Boze was born in Martigues on 7 February 1746, the son of a sailor. He studied painting in Marseille, Nîmes and Montpellier before moving to Paris in 1778. There he became a portrait painter at the court of King Louis XVI, to whom he was possibly introduced to by the Abbé de Vermond, a confidant of Marie-Antoinette at the court. He is believed to have been influenced by Quentin de la Tour.

He exhibited at the Paris Salon for the first time in 1791, where he received negative reviews. Boze initially supported the French Revolution, having joined the Jacobin Club. He painted portraits of numerous leaders of the Revolution, including Maximilien Robespierre, Jean-Paul Marat, and Camille Desmoulins, and French military officers such as Marquis Gilbert de Lafayette and Louis-Alexandre Berthier. Under the constitutional monarchy he remained loyal to Louis XVI, and in 1792 acted as an intermediary between him and the Girondins. He was arrested as a counter-revolutionary during the Reign of Terror, but was released in 1794. He signed a petition in 1799 to have the name of fellow painter Élisabeth Vigée Le Brun removed from the list of émigrés.

Little is known about his life during the subsequent Consulate and the Empire, though he was attested to be living in Paris's quartier de la Sorbonne in 1805 and 1811. In 1817, he was granted a pension by King Louis XVIII in the Bourbon Restoration. Boze died in Paris on 17 January 1826.

== Gallery ==
=== Portraits ===
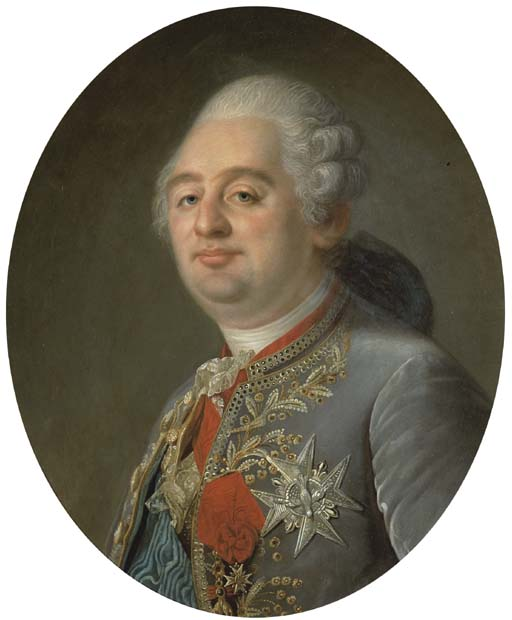
King Louis XVI, c. 1784

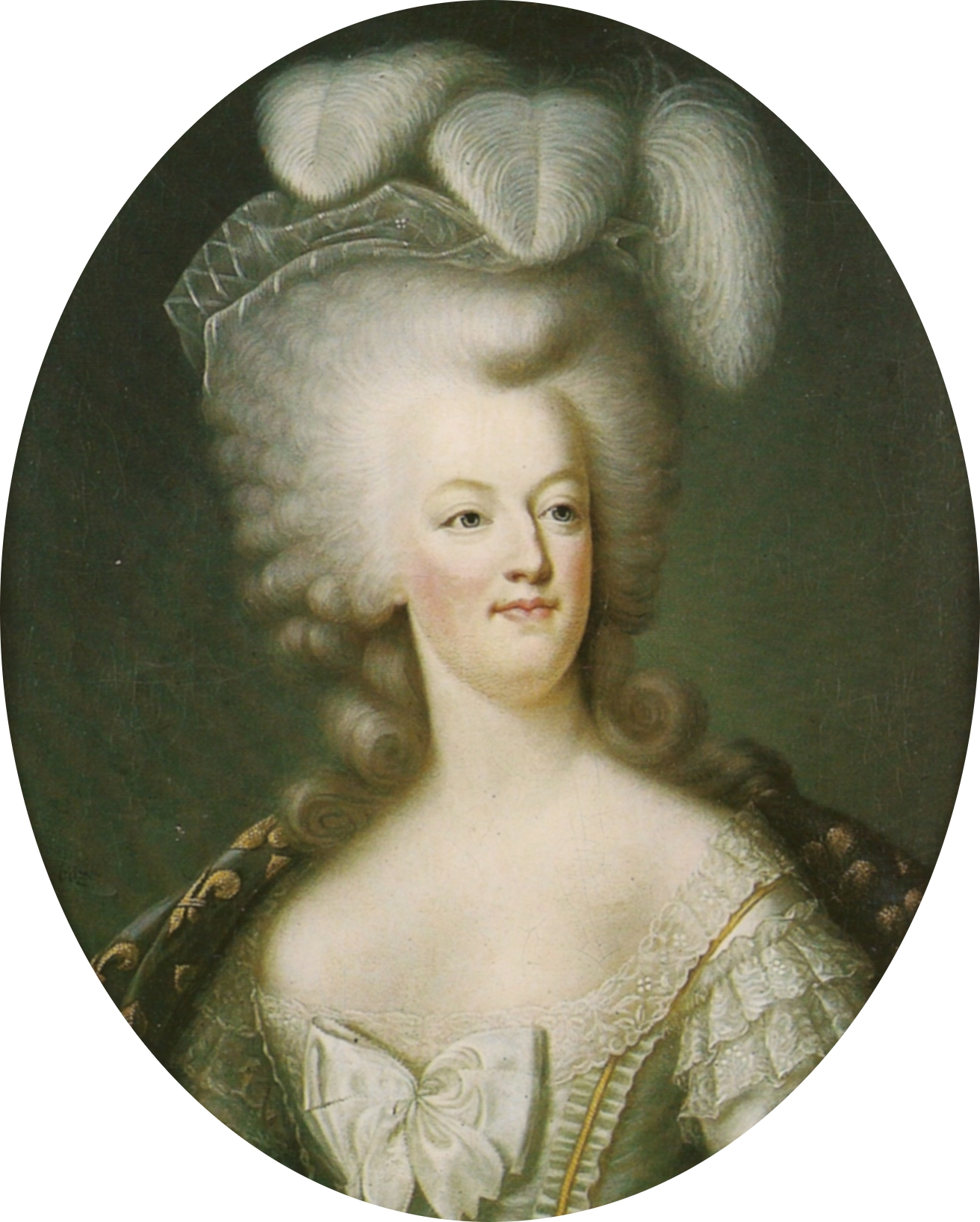
Queen Marie Antoinette, 1785

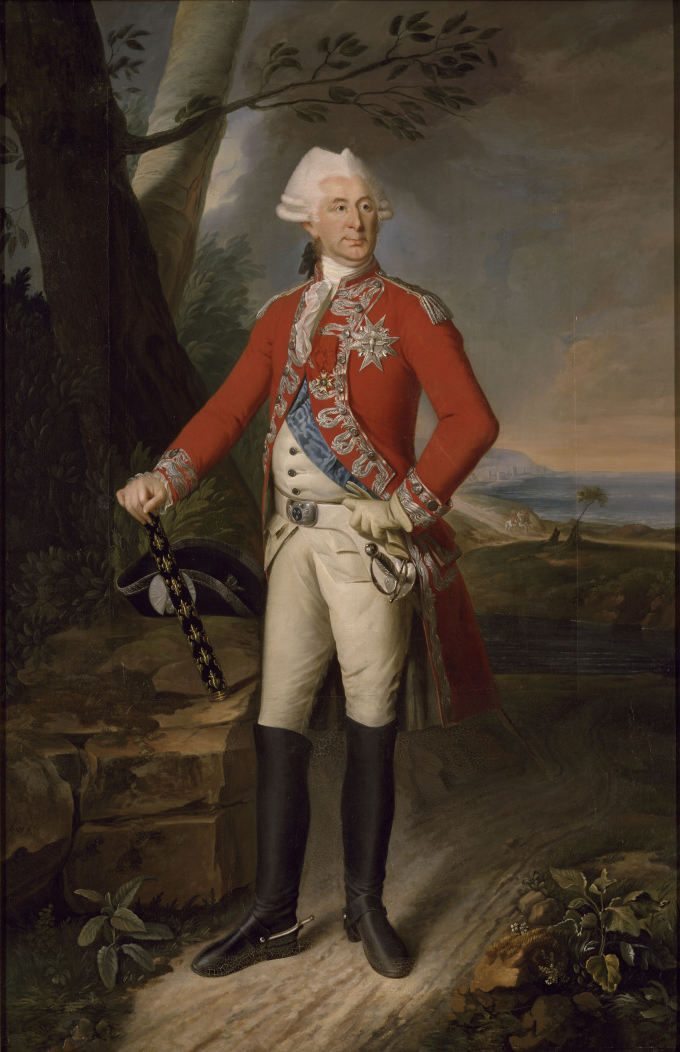
Marquis de Castries, Marshal of France

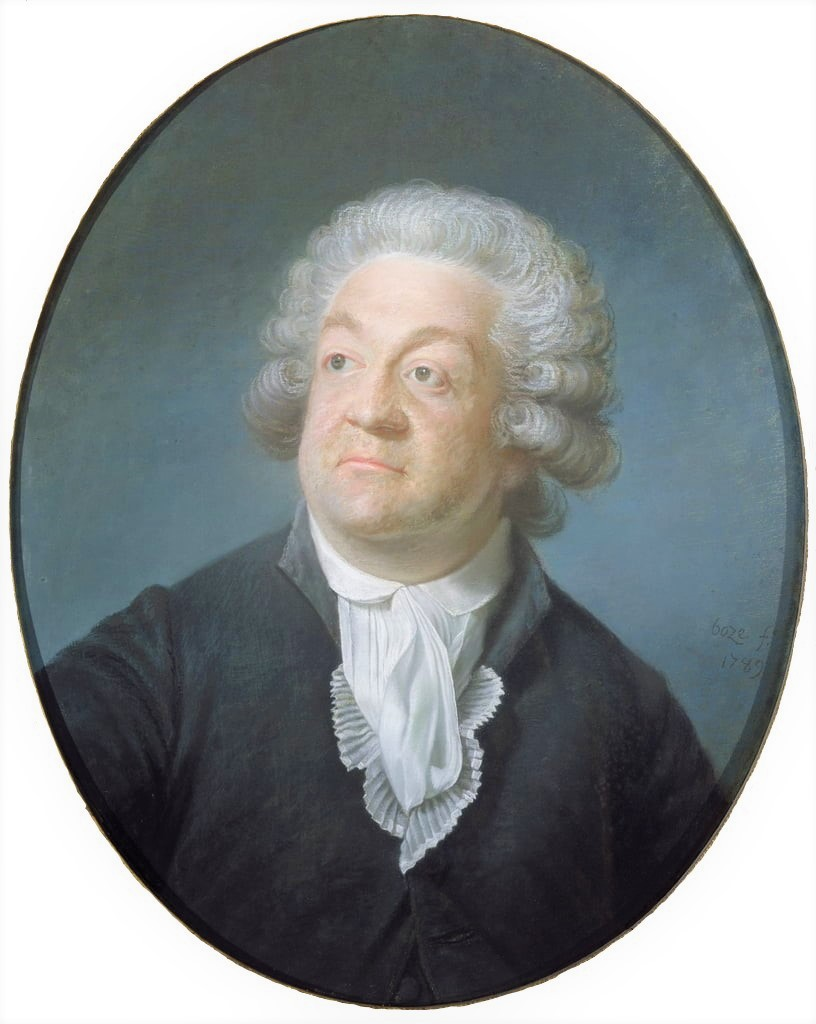
Honoré Gabriel Riqueti, Count of Mirabeau, 1789

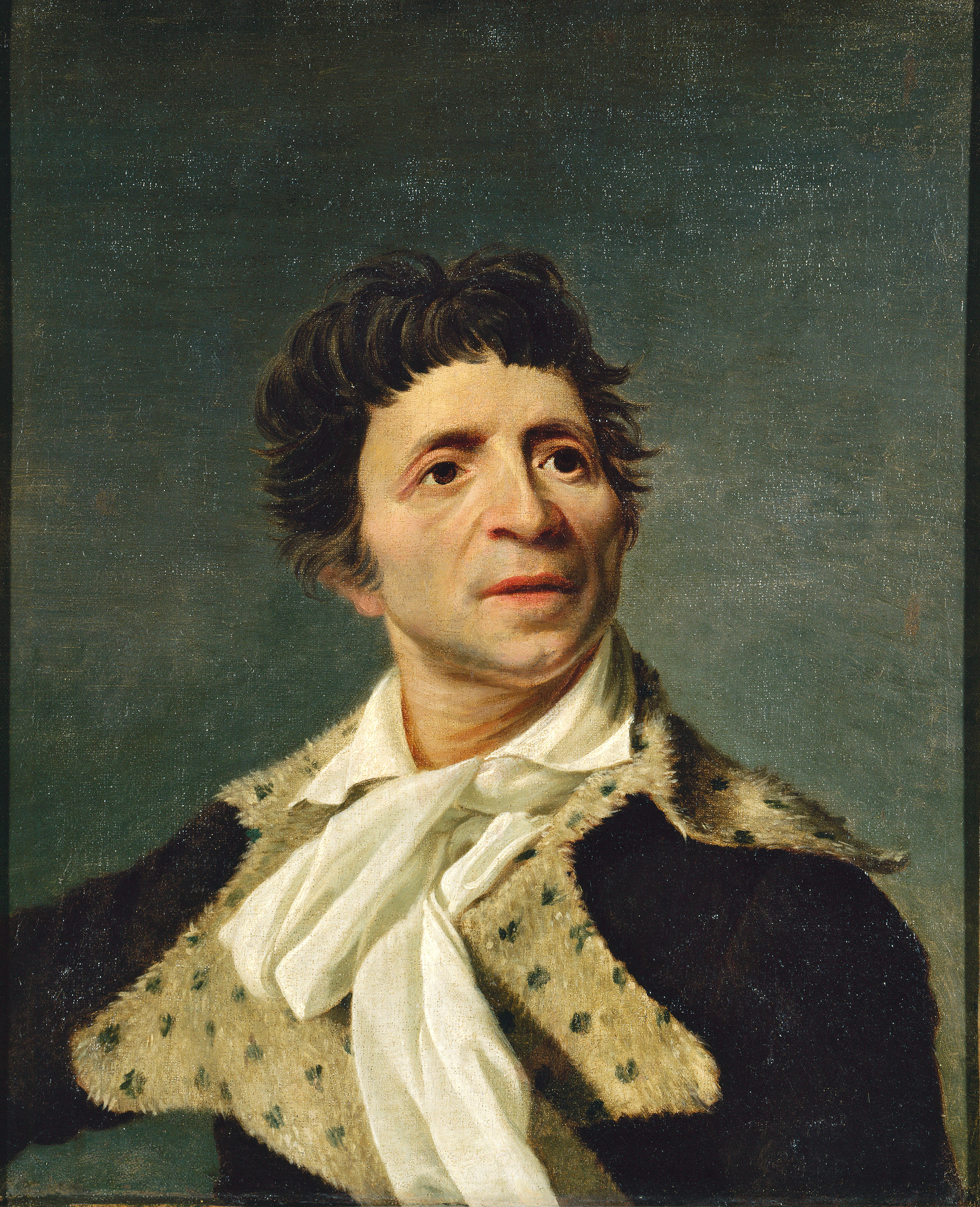
Jean-Paul Marat, 1793

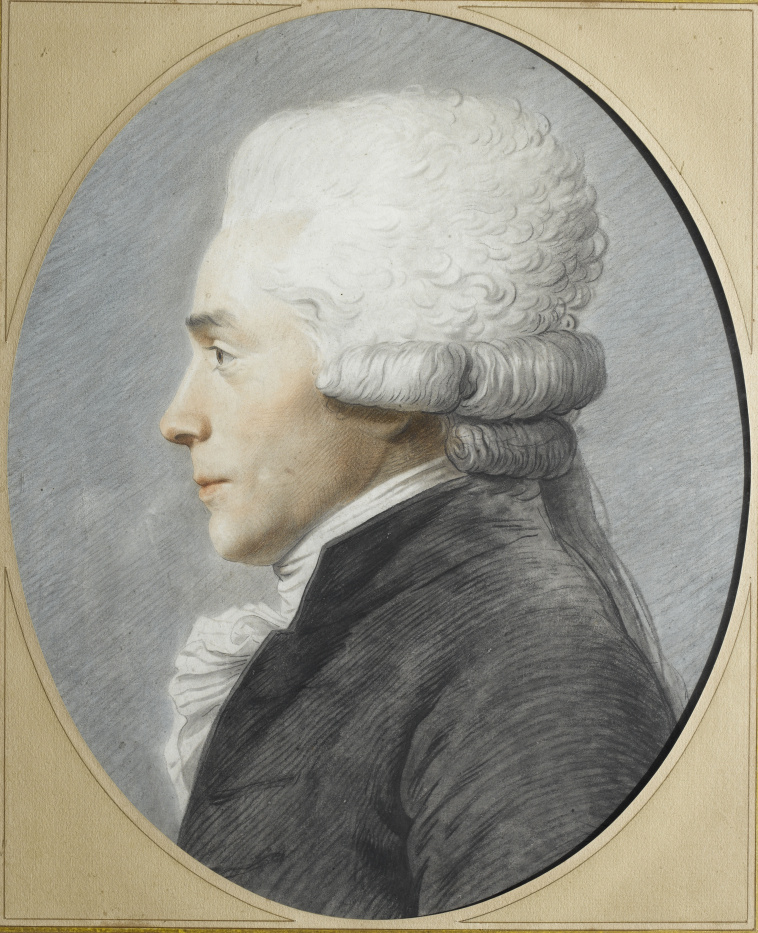
Profile of Maximilien Robespierre attributed to Boze, c. 1794

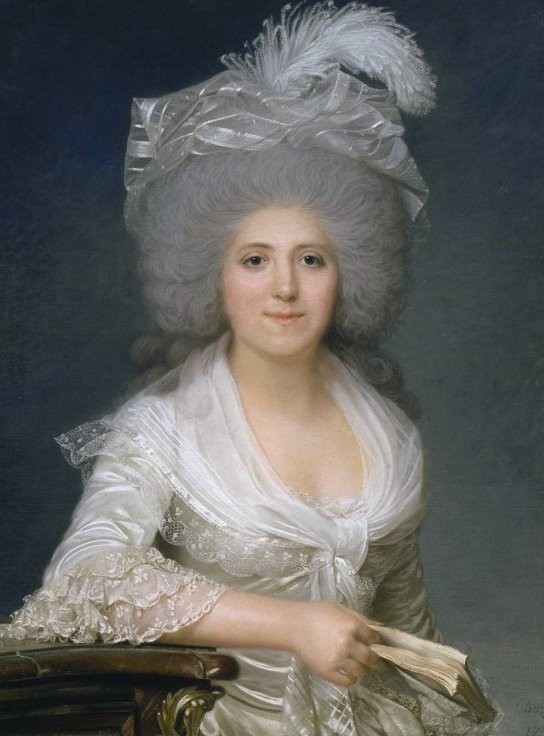
Henriette Campan, 1786

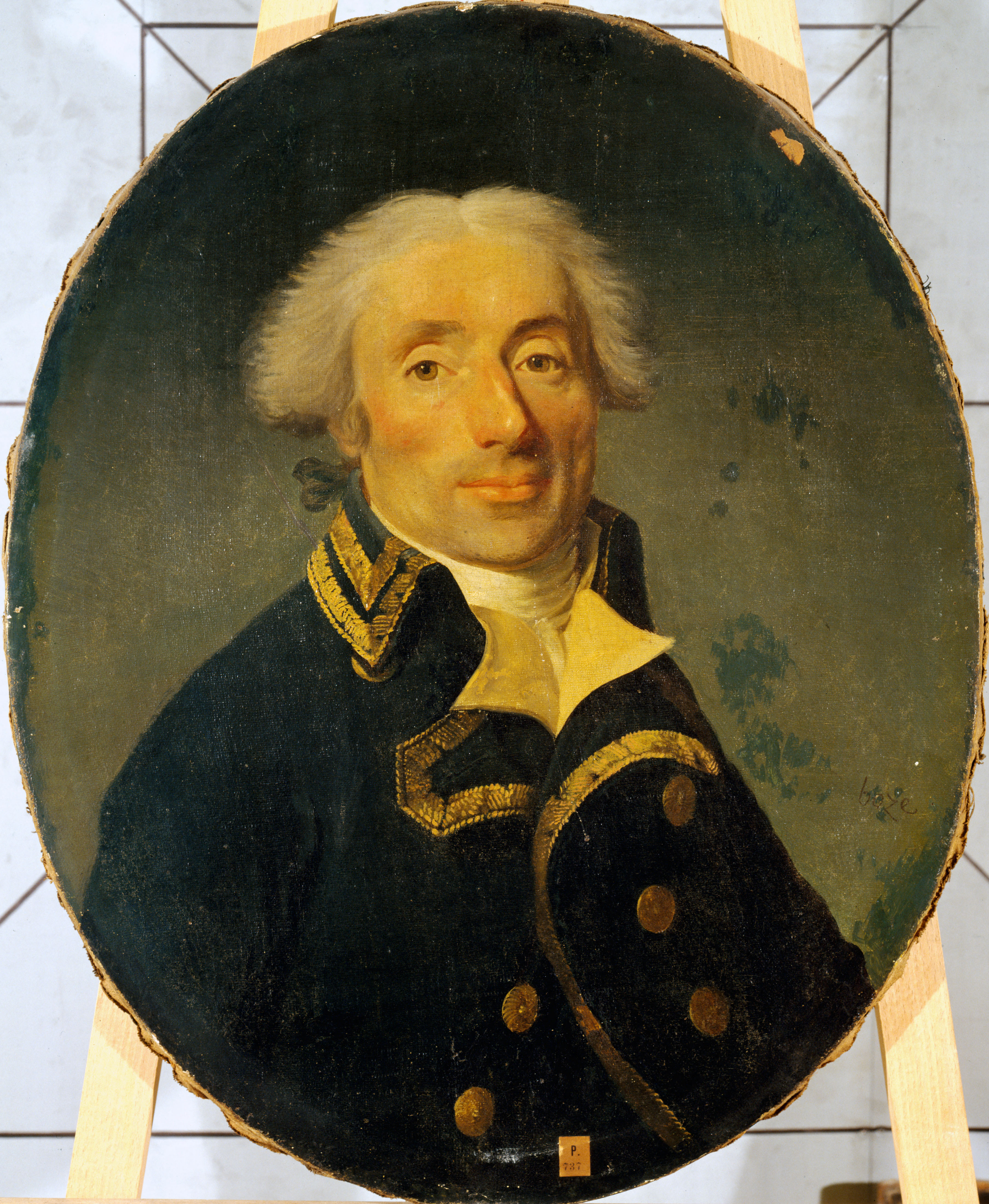
Portrait of a French general of division, between 1791 and 1794

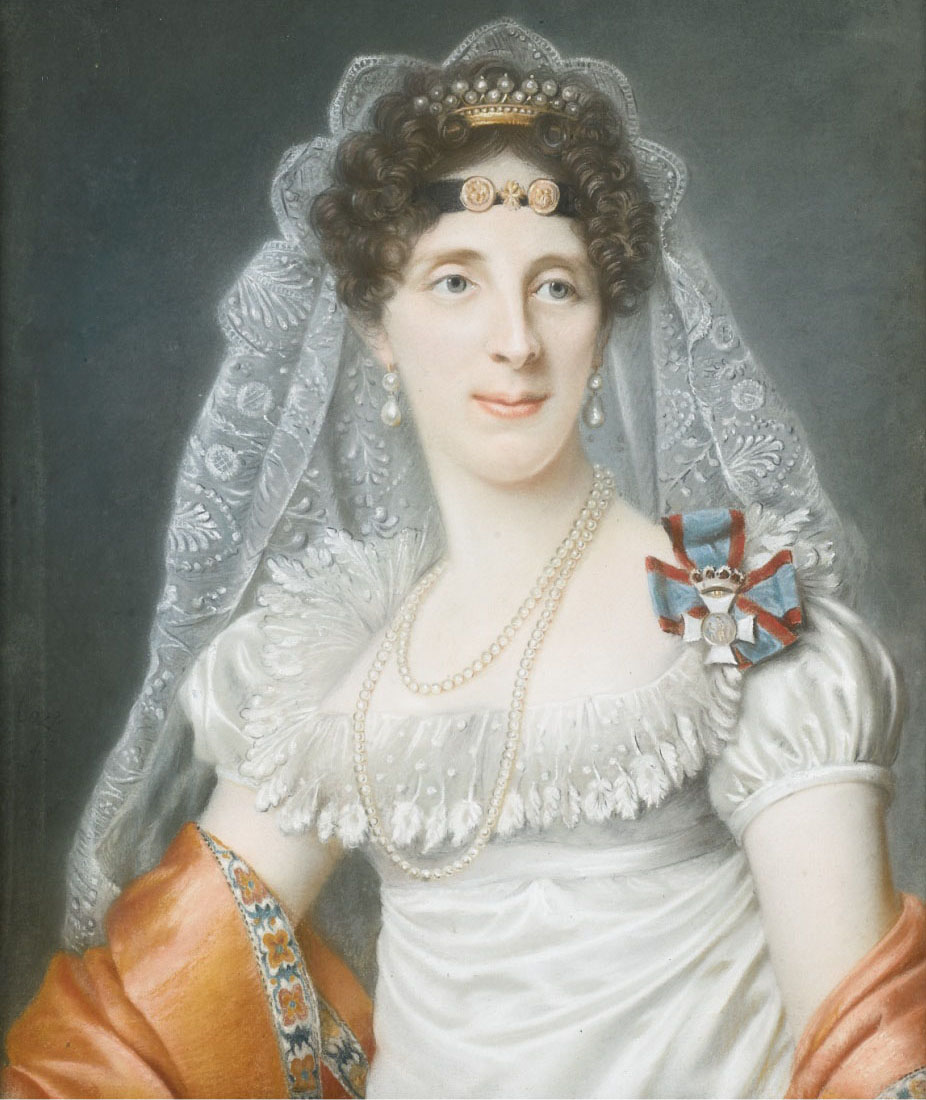
Duchess Maria Elisabeth in Bavaria, undated

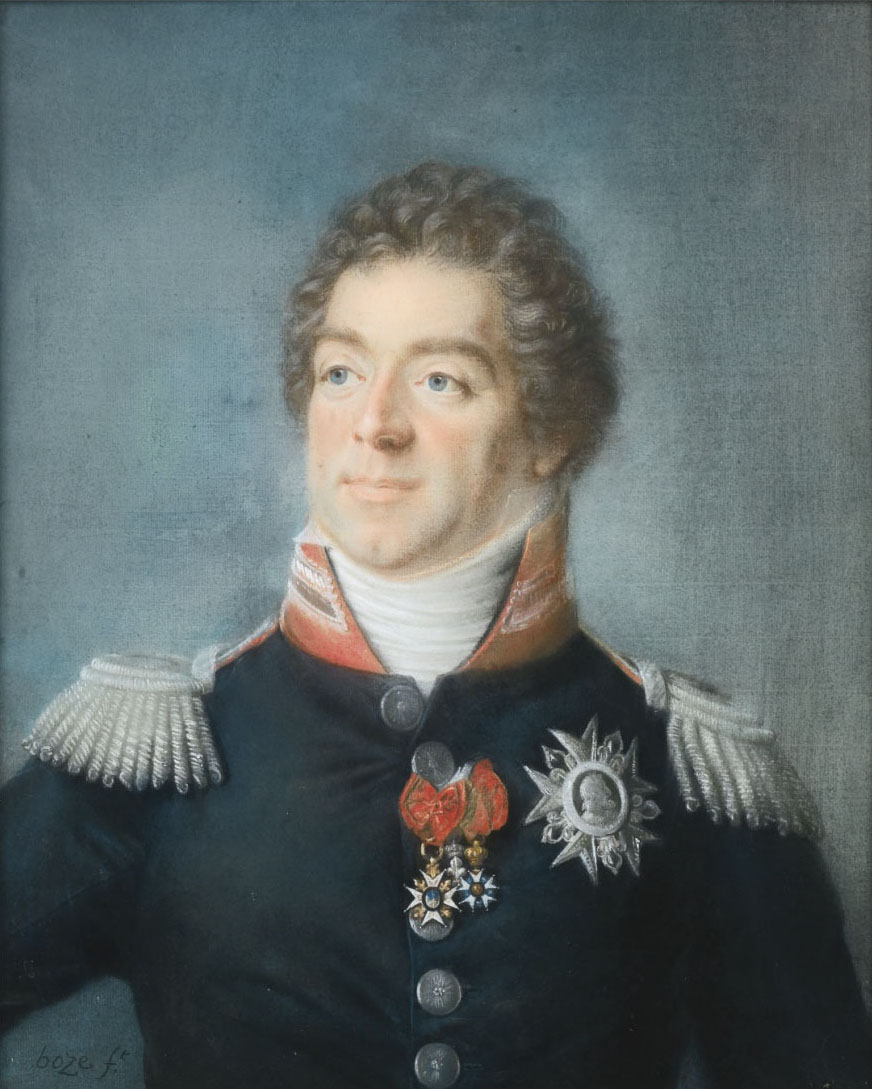
Louis-Alexandre Berthier, Marshal of the Empire and husband of Maria Elisabeth, undated
