= Alfredo Bignon =

Alfredo Bignon (1843 – 1908) was a French-Peruvian pharmacist who worked on the chemistry of cocaine. The "Bignon method" of extracting cocaine precursors was responsible for the initial growth and boom in the Peruvian cocaine industry.

Bignon was born in Paris, the son of druggist Luis Bignon. His father became a teacher of pharmacy in Lima in 1850 and Bignong grew up and studied in Peru. He went to the Faculty of Medicine in Lima to study pharmacy like his father and brother. Bignon studied chemistry privately while working in a pharmacy in the Cerro de Pasco and then moved to Lima in 1872 to run his father's Drogueria y Botica Francesa Alfredo Bignon. After the War of the Pacific he became a professor of pharmacy and chemistry in Lima's Academy of Medicine. He ran several business including a ham factory and took an interest in metallurgy and studies on alcoholism. In 1884, the use of cocaine as an anaesthetic was demonstrated in surgery by the Austrian ophthalmologist Carl Koller. Bignon then began experiments and he developed a technique to extract cocaine from coca leaves to produce cocaine sulphate of 60% purity in 1885. The resulting material was ideal for transporting for further purification to produce cocaine hydrochloride. Bignon's method led to a boom in the production and export of cocaine. By 1885, he was outcompeted by German pharmaceutical agents who went to Peru and established a chain to supply to the German pharmaceutical industry. Boehringer-Mannheim sent Louis Schaefer who developed coca syrups for use in Coca-Cola. After 1900, Bignon returned to Paris.
