= Despotism =

Government by a single entity with absolute power

Pol Pot, leader of the Khmer Rouge, is widely regarded as one of the most brutal despots in history, responsible for the deaths of an estimated quarter of Cambodia's population.

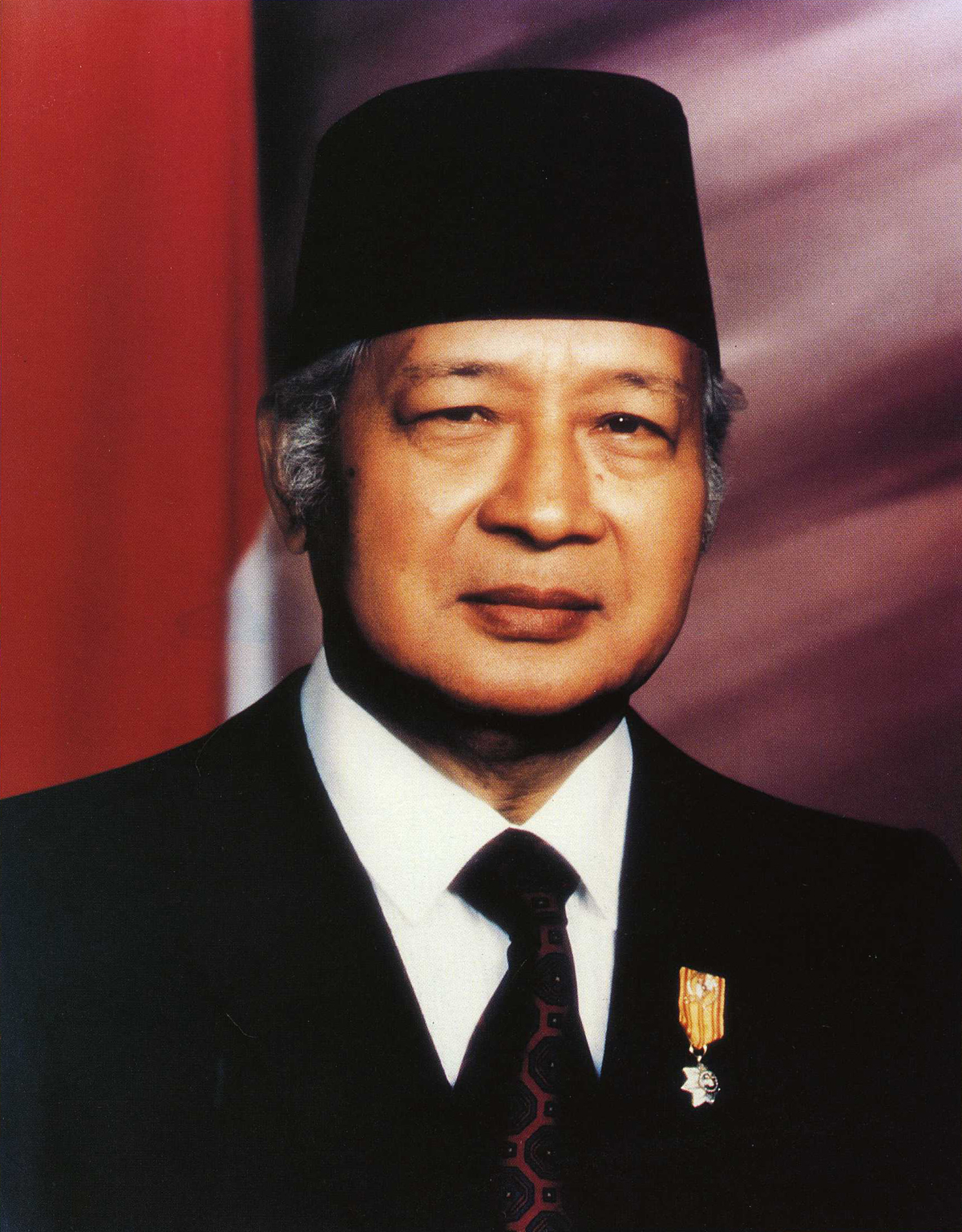
Suharto, who ruled Indonesia from 1967 to 1998 under the 'New Order' regime, is regarded as a despot whose rise to power followed the 1965–66 anti-communist purges, during which an estimated half a million people were killed, and whose rule was marked by authoritarianism, repression, and endemic corruption.

In political science, despotism is a form of government in which a single entity rules with absolute power. Normally, that entity is an individual, the despot (as in an autocracy), but societies which limit respect and power to specific groups have also been called despotic.

Colloquially, the word despot applies pejoratively to those who use their power and authority arbitrarily to oppress their populace or subordinates. More specifically, the term often applies to a head of state or government. In this sense, it is similar to the pejorative connotations that are associated with the terms tyrant and dictator.

Despot has also been a royal title assumed by various leaders historically, such as by rulers of the Serbian Despotate.

== Etymology ==
The root despot comes from the Greek word despotes, which means "one with power." In ancient Greek usage, a despótès was technically a master who ruled in a household over those who were slaves or servants by nature. The term has been used to describe many rulers and governments throughout history. It connoted the absolute authority and power exercised by the pharaohs of Ancient Egypt, signified nobility in Byzantine courts, designated the rulers of Byzantine vassal states, and acted as a title for Byzantine emperors. In this and other Greek or Greek influenced contexts, the term was used as an honorific rather than as a pejorative.

== Philosophy ==
=== French 18th century thought ===
The concept of despotism, and especially oriental despotism, entered European political thought with Montesquieu's The Spirit of the Laws in the 18th century. The idea was not new or unique to Montesquieu's work, but Montesquieu's work is widely regarded as having been the most influential on modern political thought. According to Montesquieu, the difference between absolute monarchy and despotism is that in the case of the monarchy, a single person governs with absolute power by fixed and established laws, whereas a despot governs by their own will and caprice. Later political thinkers such as François Quesnay and Simon-Nicholas Henri Linguet embraced the idea of oriental despotism in attempt to convince that a despot who is not dependent on the aristocracy has an interest to work more for the people than a monarch in the European political system. Quesnay and his contemporary physiocrat Pierre-Paul Lemercier called their ideal form of governance legal despotism.

== History ==
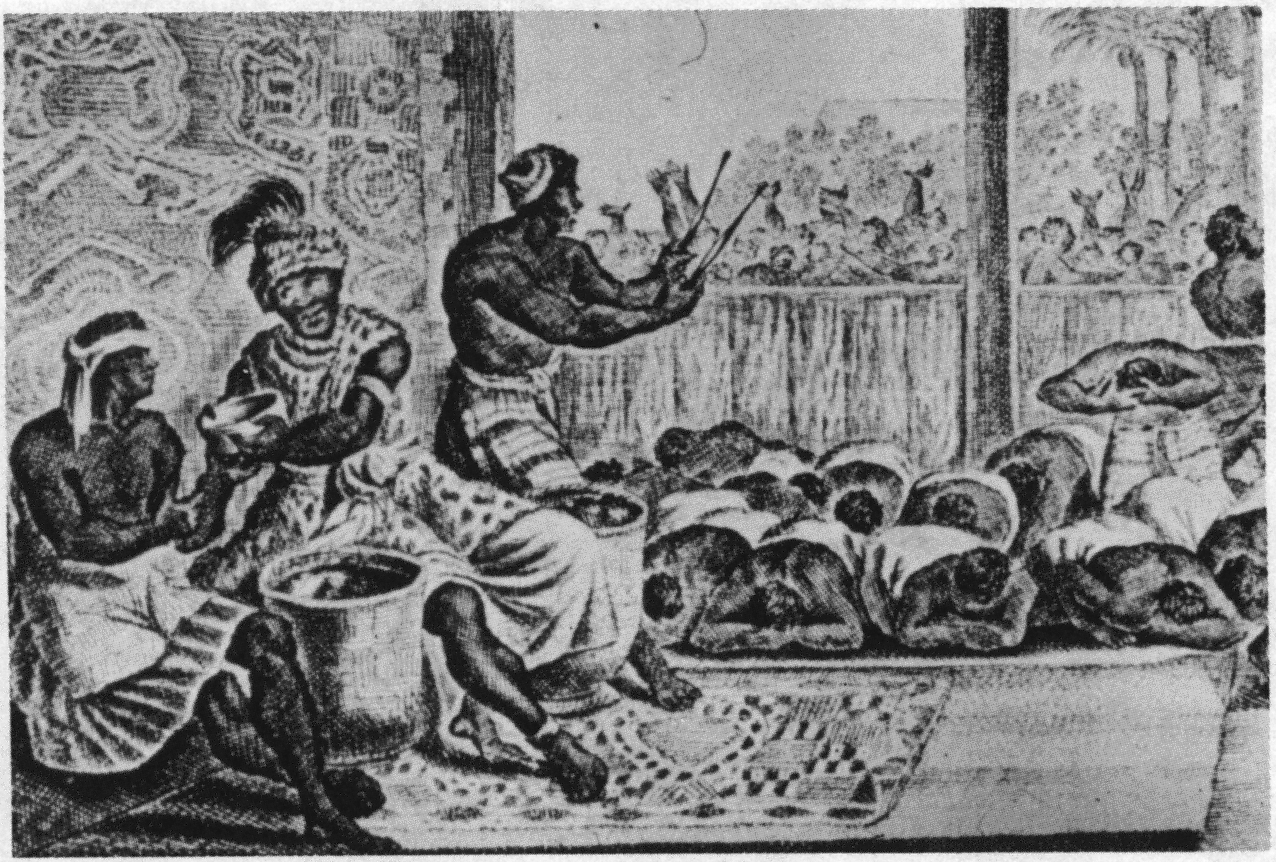
The court of N'Gangue M'voumbe Niambi from the book Description of Africa (1668)

In its classical form, despotism is a state in which a single individual (the despot) holds all the power and authority embodying the state, and everyone else is a subsidiary person.

Edward Gibbon suggested that the increasing use of Oriental-style despotism by the Roman emperors was a major factor in the fall of the Roman Empire, particularly from the reign of Elagabalus:

As the attention of the new emperor was diverted by the most trifling amusements, he wasted many months in his luxurious progress from Syria to Italy, passed at Nicomedia his first winter after his victory, and deferred till the ensuing summer his triumphal entry into the capital. A faithful picture, however, which preceded his arrival, and was placed by his immediate order over the altar of Victory in the senate-house, conveyed to the Romans the just but unworthy resemblance of his person and manners. He was drawn in his sacerdotal robes of silk and gold, after the loose flowing fashion of the Medes and Phoenicians; his head was covered with a lofty tiara, his numerous collars and bracelets were adorned with gems of an inestimable value. His eyebrows were tinged with black, and his cheeks painted with an artificial red and white. The grave senators confessed with a sigh, that, after having long experienced the stern tyranny of their own countrymen, Rome was at length humbled beneath the effeminate luxury of Oriental despotism. (The Decline and Fall of the Roman Empire, Book One, Chapter Six)

Yet although the word has a pejorative meaning nowadays, it was once a legitimate title of office in the Byzantine Empire, first used under Manuel I Komnenos (1143–1180) who awarded the title to his appointed heir Alexius-Béla. It was typically bestowed on sons-in-law and later sons of the Emperor and, beginning in the 13th century, it was bestowed to foreign princes. Despots ruled over parts of the empire called Despotates.

The modern term seems to have been coined by the opponents of Louis XIV of France in the 1690s, who applied the term despotisme to describe their monarch's somewhat free exercise of power, but the Enlightenment philosopher Montesquieu believed that while republics were suitable for small states and monarchies were ideal for moderate-sized states, despotism was an appropriate government for large states. In enlightened absolutism (also known as benevolent despotism), which came to prominence in 18th century Europe, absolute monarchs used their authority to institute a number of reforms in the political systems and societies of their countries.

At the same time, the term was used to imply tyrannical rule. The United States Declaration of Independence accused King George III of "a long train of abuses and usurpations, pursuing invariably the same Object, evinc[ing] a design to reduce [the people] under absolute Despotism". Nowadays, "despotism" can refer to any absolutist or dictatorial regime or leader that uses their power in a cruel manner.

== See also ==
- Autocracy
- Authoritarianism
- Absolute monarchy
- Dictatorship
- Despot (court title)
- Enlightened absolutism
- Legal despotism
- Oriental despotism
- Patrimonialism
- Rule of man
- Totalitarianism
