= List of rulers of Loango =

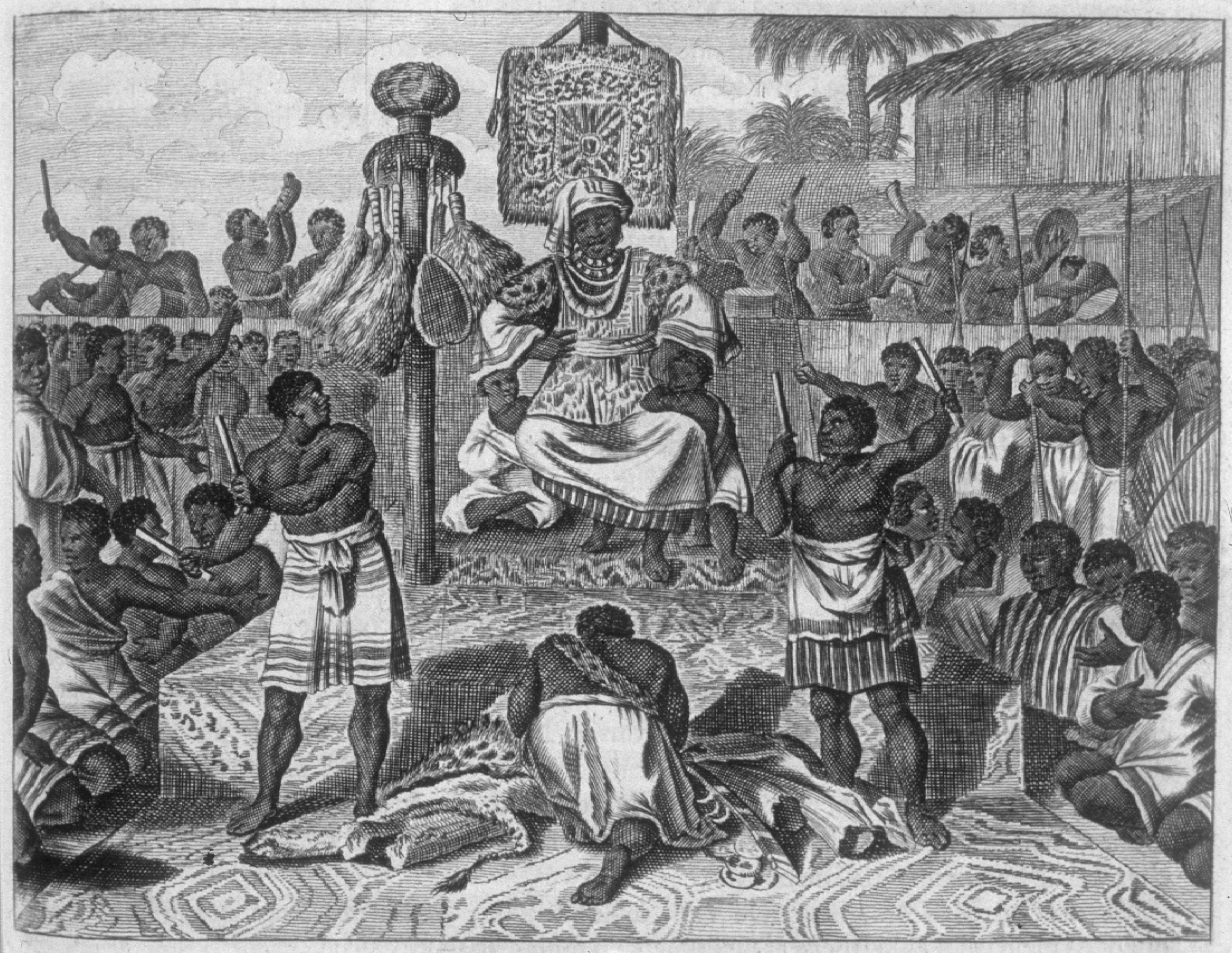
King of Loango, Dutch illustration, 1686.

This is a list of the known kings of Loango.

It is not possible with current knowledge to present a definitive list of the rulers of Loango. There are only scattered references in the documentation left by visitors that can help to establish a chronology.

- "Gembe" or "Gymbe" was noted as the ruler who preceded the king during the visit of Andrew Battell in around 1605.
- An anonymous Dutch source mentions that an unnamed ruler died around 1625 and that he had ruled for "a good 60 years".
- An anonymous Dutch source describes the successor to this ruler as his sister's son, and gives his name as "Iemby Cambrijs", and describe him of being of "good nature" and likely to have a successful reign.
- The Italian Capuchin missionary Bernardo Ungaro baptized a king in 1663 as Afonso, who was overthrown soon afterward by a non-Christian rival, who was in turn succeeded by a Christian in 1665.
- The English merchant Nathaniel Uring visited Loango in 1701 and reported that the king had recently died and affairs were in the hands of a woman named "Ma-kundy".
- The French missionaries who visited with Abbé Proyart noted that the predecessor of the unnamed king ruling in his day had died in 1766, and that his unnamed successor only took office following an interregnum of seven years (thus 1773).
- Another French visitor, Degrandpré witnessed the funeral of an unnamed king in 1787.
- Adolph Bastian, a German ethnographer led an expedition to Loango which lasted 1873-76, in his book published in 1874, he provided the first list of kings as they were remembered in oral tradition. His list included kings back to Njimbe who his informants named as the founder.
- Eduard Pechuël-Loesche, a member of the same expedition provided another list of kings in a book only published in 1907. He named the king who died in 1787 as Puaty (Buati) and said there had been no king crowned since then.
- R. E. Dennett, an English trader who first came to the Loango coast in 1879, but only began serious study of its history in 1891, left a list of rulers in a book he published in 1906. He also said his informants named Njimbe as the first king.
- Phyllis Martin compiled a list of kings from some of these sources in 1972.

Njimbe c. 1600

a number of other kings named in oral traditions without any chronological order:

- Tati of Kondi
- Bicullu
- Makosso
- Nombe
- Puati of Tchibanga
- Yambi
- Tati (might be same as Tati of Kondi)
- Bicullu Unkangebange (may be same as Bicullu above)
- -1776 Makosso
- 1776-73 Interregnum
- 1773-87 Buatu

After Buatu no more rulers were chosen, but some royal type power was exercised by the Nganga Mvumbi (priest of the corpse) who was empowered to oversee the unburied corpse of Buatu. He was in power from 1787 until at least 1800. A list of these, without clear order follows:

- Tati
- Luemba
- Makosso I
- Puati I
- Puati II
- Makosso II
- Makosso III
- -1874 Nombe (or Numbe)
- 1874-/1883/4 Ntatu
- 1883/4- ? Makosso Chikussu
- ?? Poaty

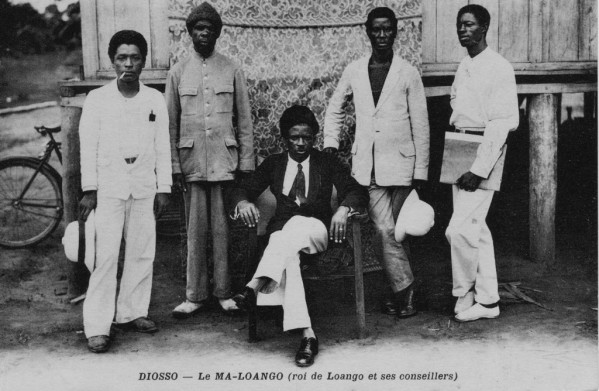
Image titled 'King of Loango and his Advisors' (1920)

- 1898- ? Loembe

The following list was supplied by another Wikipedia editor without sources:

== Before the 18th century ==
- Moe Poaty I Kamangou
- Ngouli N'Kama Loembe
- N'Gangue M'voumbe Niambi

== 18th century ==
- N'Gangue M'voumbe Nombo ? -1766
- N'Gangue M'voumbe Makosso 1773-1787

== 19th century ==
- N'Gangue M'voumbe Makosso Ma Nombo
- N'Gangue M'voumbe Makosso Ma N'Sangou 1840-1885
