= Enlightened absolutism =

Political philosophy

Enlightened absolutism, also called enlightened despotism, was the conduct and policies of European absolute monarchs during the 18th and early 19th centuries who were influenced by the ideas of the Enlightenment, espousing those ideas to enhance their power. The concept originated during the Enlightenment period in the 18th and into the early 19th centuries. An enlightened absolutist is a non-democratic or authoritarian leader who exercises their political power based upon the principles of the Enlightenment. Enlightened monarchs distinguished themselves from ordinary rulers by claiming to rule for their subjects' well-being. John Stuart Mill stated that despotism is a legitimate mode of government in dealing with barbarians, provided the end be their improvement.

Enlightened absolutists' beliefs about royal power were typically similar to those of regular despots, both recognizing that they were destined to rule. Enlightened rulers may have played a part in the abolition of serfdom in Europe. The enlightened despotism of Emperor Joseph II of the Holy Roman Empire is summarized as "Everything for the people, nothing by the people".

== History ==
Enlightened absolutism is the theme of an essay by Frederick the Great, who ruled Prussia from 1740 to 1786, defending this system of government. When the prominent French Enlightenment philosopher Voltaire fell out of favor in France, he eagerly accepted Frederick's invitation to live at his palace. He believed that an enlightened monarchy was the only real way for society to advance. Frederick was an enthusiast of French ideas. Frederick explained: "My principal occupation is to combat ignorance and prejudice ... to enlighten minds, cultivate morality, and to make people as happy as it suits human nature, and as the means at my disposal permit."

The difference between an absolutist and an enlightened absolutist is based on a broad analysis of the degree to which they embraced the Age of Enlightenment. Historians debate the actual implementation of enlightened absolutism. They distinguish between the "enlightenment" of the ruler personally, versus that of his regime. For example, Frederick the Great was tutored in the ideas of the French Enlightenment in his youth, and maintained those ideas in his private life as an adult, but in many ways was unable or unwilling to effect enlightened reforms in practice.

The concept of enlightened absolutism was formally described by the German historian Wilhelm Roscher in 1847 and remains controversial among scholars.

Centralized control required the systematic collection of information about the nation. One major development was the gathering, use, and interpretation of numerical and statistical data, including trade statistics, harvest reports, death records, and population censuses. Starting in the 1760s, officials in France and Germany began increasingly to rely on quantitative data for systematic planning, especially regarding long-term economic growth. It combined the utilitarian agenda of "enlightened absolutism" with the new ideas being developed in economics. In Germany and France, the trend was especially strong in Cameralism and Physiocracy.

== Major nations ==
Government responses to the Age of Enlightenment varied widely. In several nations with powerful rulers, called "enlightened despots" by historians, leaders of the Enlightenment were welcomed at Court and helped design laws and programs to reform the system, typically to build stronger national states. In France the government was hostile, and the philosophers fought against its censorship. The British government generally ignored the Enlightenment's leaders.

Frederick the Great explained, "My principal occupation is to combat ignorance and prejudice ... to enlighten minds, cultivate morality, and to make people as happy as it suits human nature, and as the means at my disposal permit". He wrote an essay on "Benevolent Despotism" defending this system of government.

Empress Catherine II of Russia sponsored the Russian Enlightenment. She incorporated many ideas of Enlightenment philosophers, especially Montesquieu, in her Nakaz, which was intended to revise Russian law. However, inviting the famous French philosopher Denis Diderot to her court worked out poorly.

Charles III, King of Spain from 1759 to 1788, tried to rescue his empire from decay through far-reaching reforms such as weakening the Church and its monasteries, promoting science and university research, facilitating trade and commerce, modernizing agriculture and avoiding wars. The centralization of power in Madrid angered the local nobility, and challenged the traditional autonomy of cities, and so resistance grew steadily. Consequently, Spain relapsed after his death.

Emperor Joseph II, ruler of Austria 1780–1790, was over-enthusiastic, announcing so many reforms that had so little support that revolts broke out, and his regime became a comedy of errors.

In some countries the initiative came not from rulers but from senior officials such as the Marquis of Pombal, who was Joseph I of Portugal's Secretary of State. For a brief period in Denmark Johann Friedrich Struensee attempted to govern in terms of Enlightenment principles. After issuing 1,069 decrees in 13 months covering many major reforms, his enemies overthrew him, and he was executed and quartered.

== Modern use ==
Reza Shah Pahlavi, relying upon a coalition of secular constitutionalists, liberal-democratic thinkers, traditional clergy, and the general population, enacted a form of enlightened absolutism, seeking to modernize Iran by combining absolute monarchism with liberal ideas. He reformed the bureaucracy, promoted religious tolerance, and fostered economic growth, all the while restoring a monarchial institution and preserving an authoritarian governance structure.

Crown Prince Mohammad bin Salman, prime minister and de facto ruler of Saudi Arabia (an absolute monarchy) has been described as a modern-day enlightened monarch. Since assuming power as crown prince in 2017, he has enacted widespread reforms which have reduced the power of Wahhabi clergy and religious police in a theocratic kingdom. However, Saudi Arabia remains an authoritarian state, with a poor human rights record and frequent jailing and political persecution of political dissidents.

== Associated rulers ==
Examples of enlightened absolutist monarchs

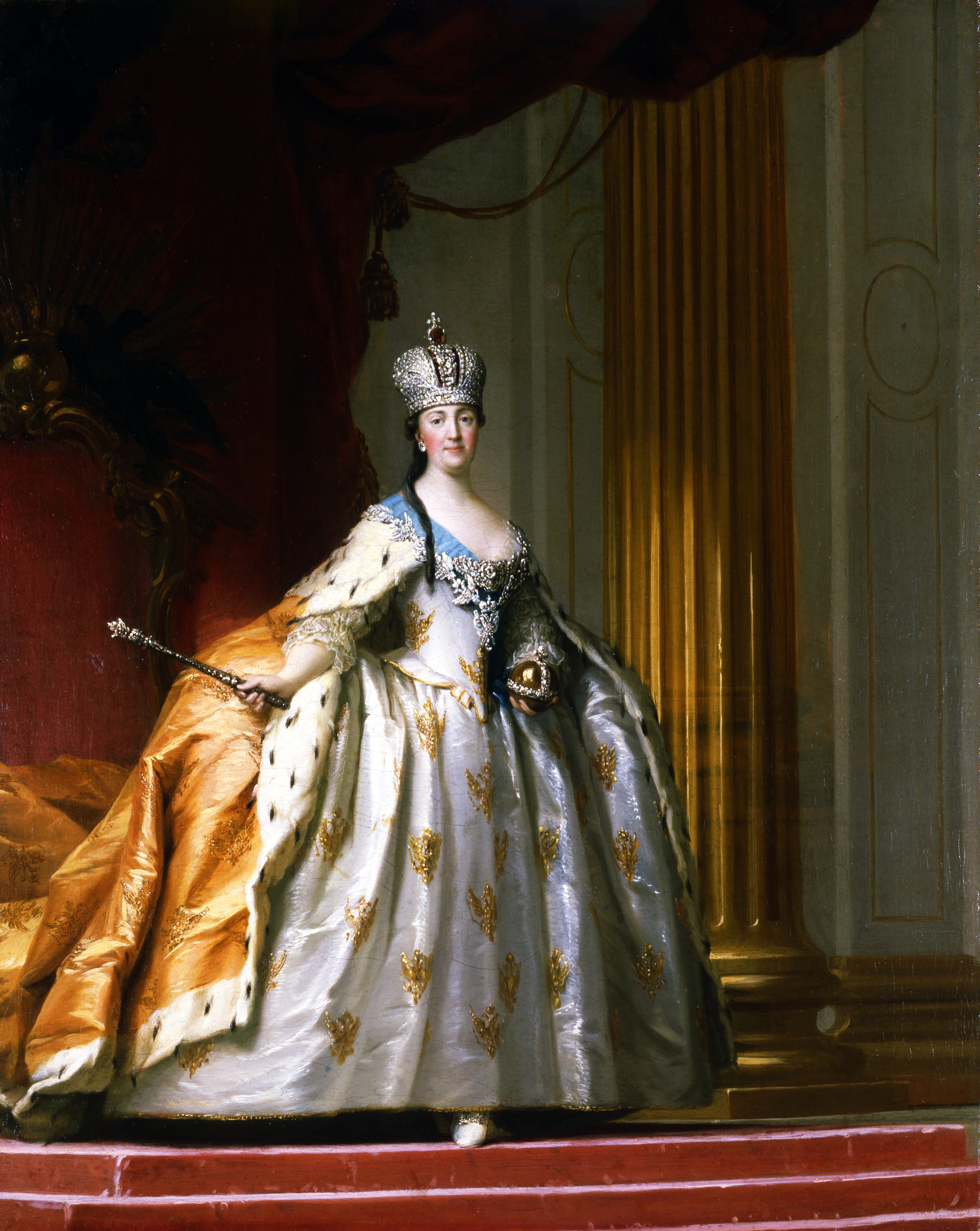
Catherine II of Russia

Maria Theresa

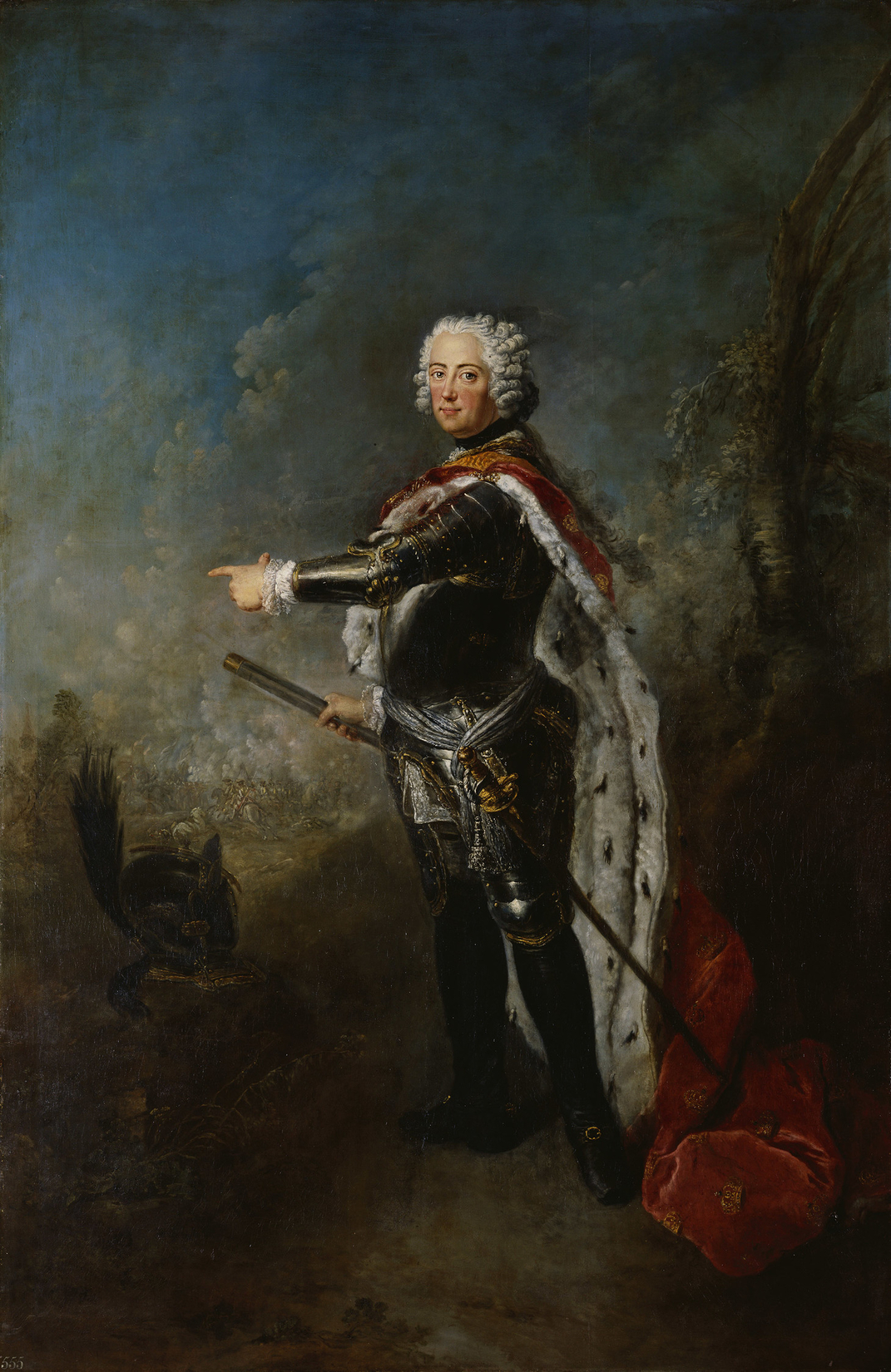
Frederick II of Prussia

Frederick Augustus I of Saxony

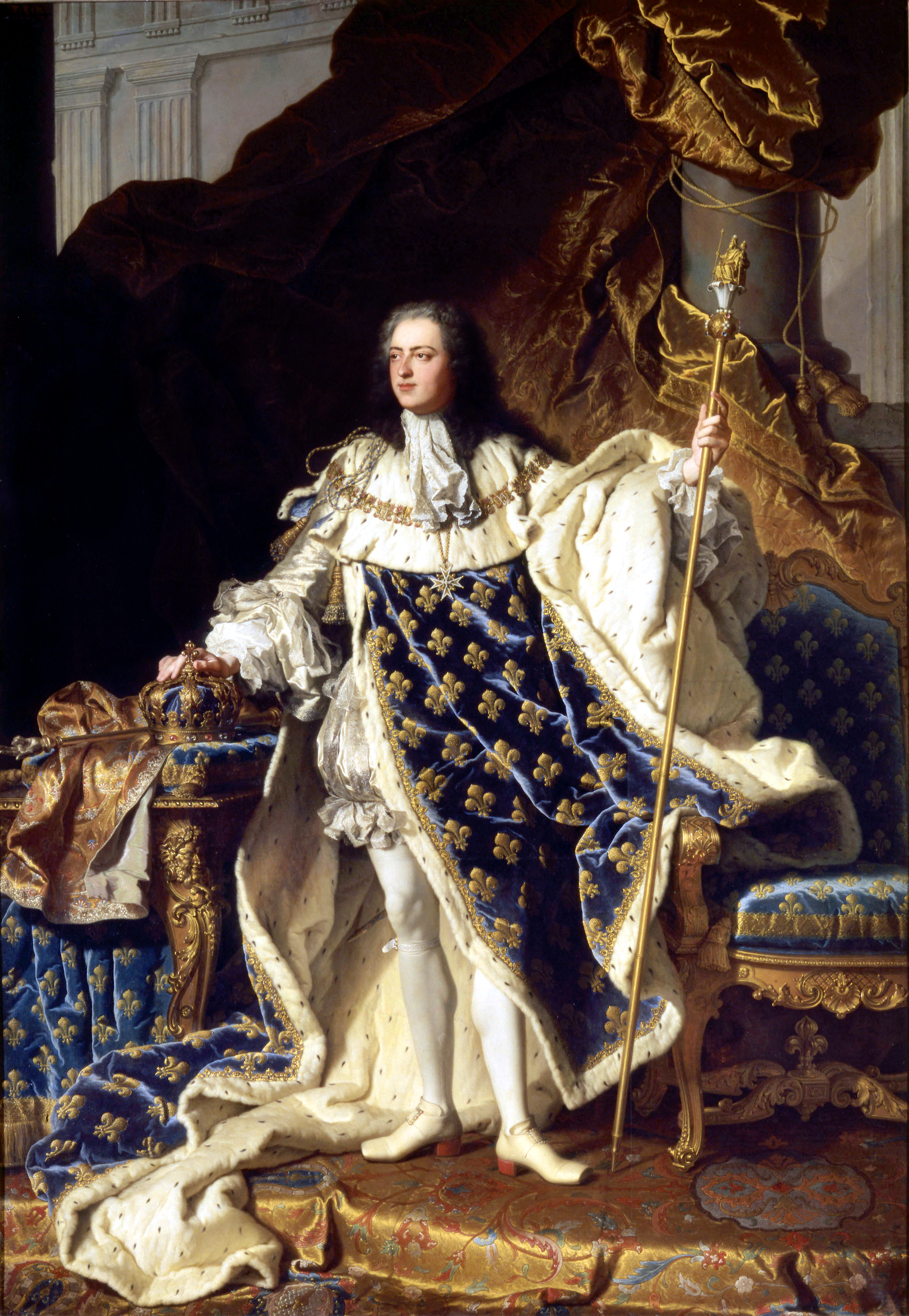
Louis XV

Charles Emmanuel III of Sardinia

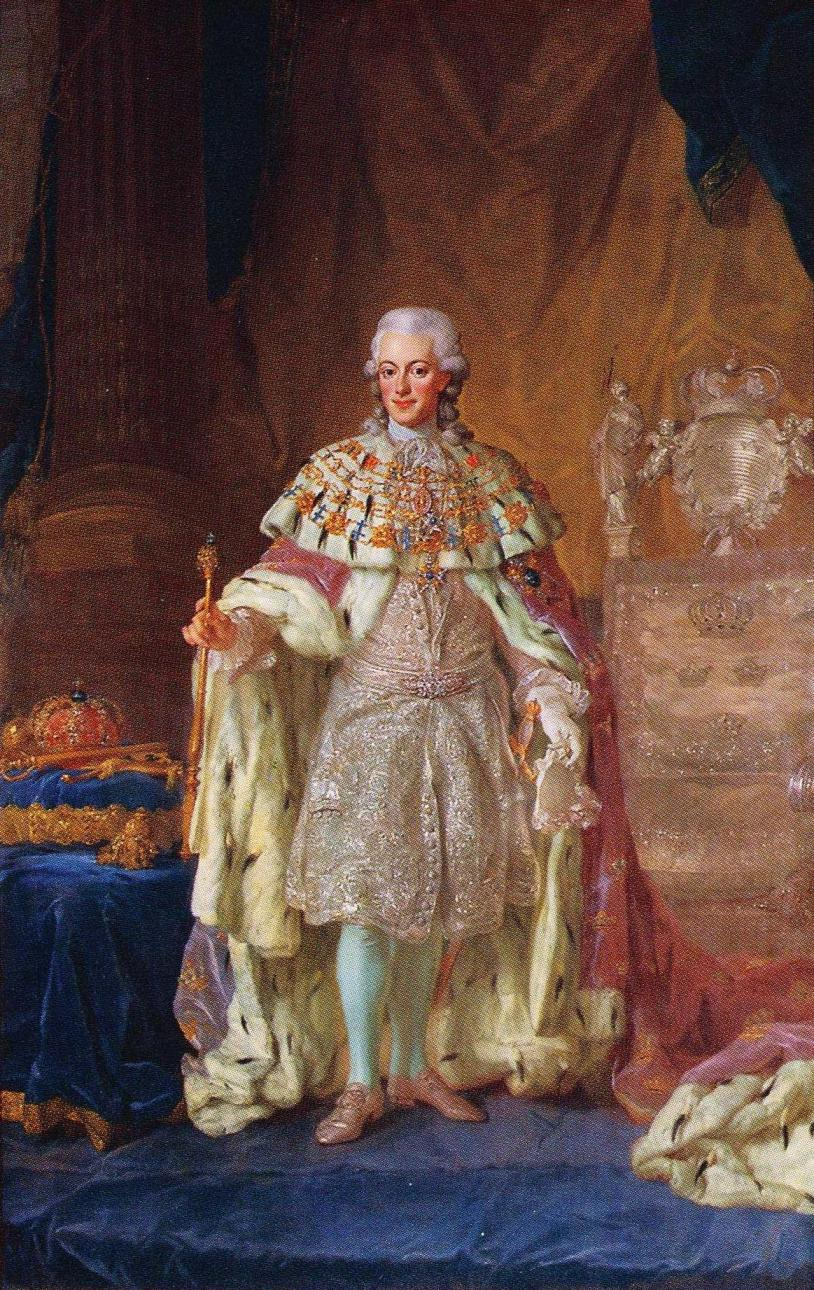
Gustav III of Sweden

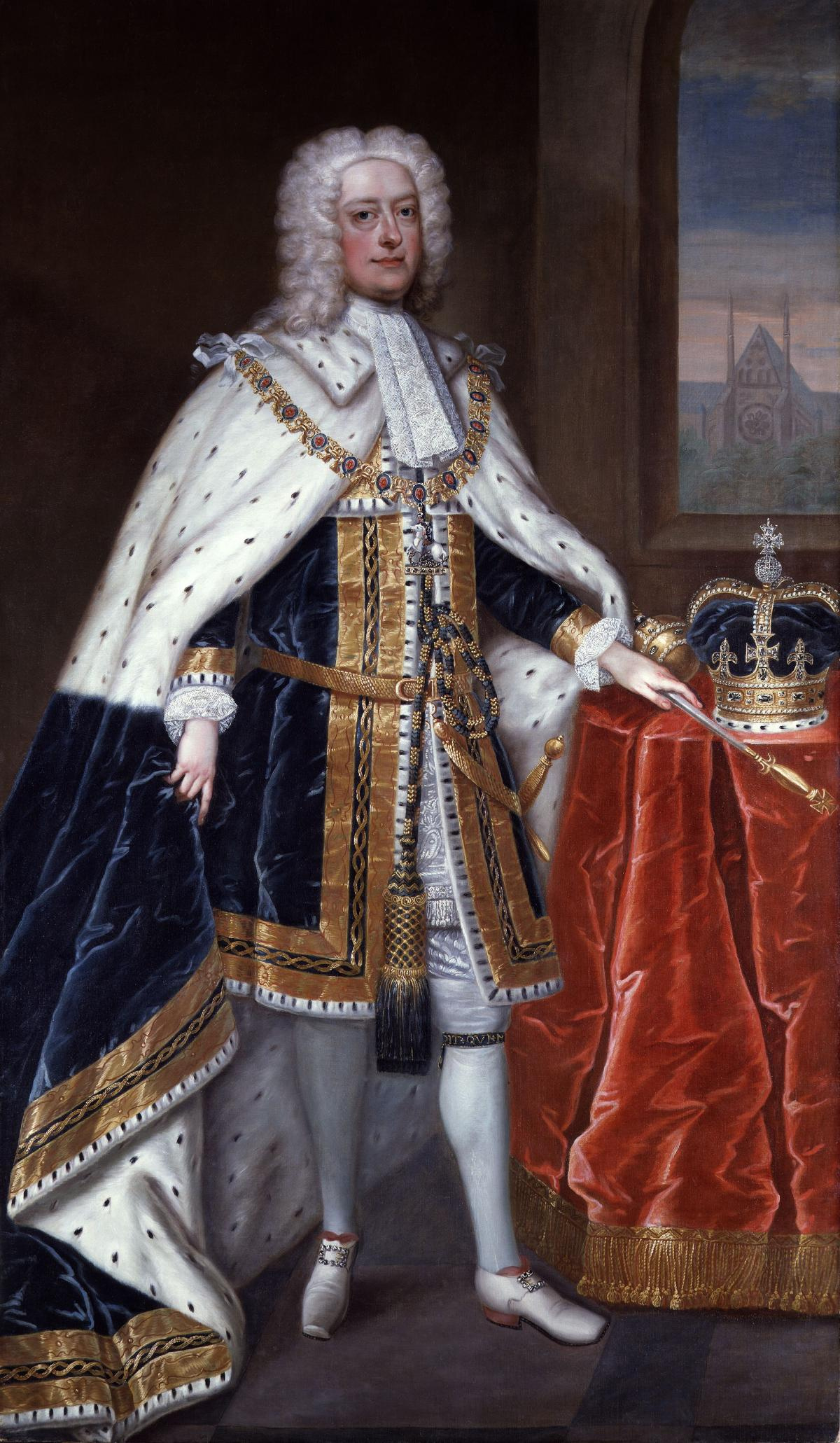
George II

Christian VII of Denmark

Charles III of Spain

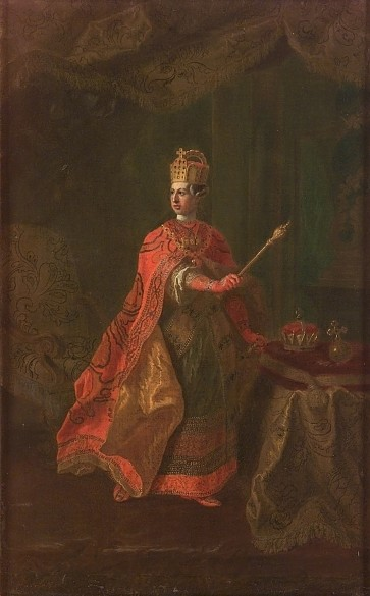
Joseph II, Holy Roman Emperor

Ferdinand IV of Naples
- Peter the Great of Russia (1682–1725)
- Catherine the Great of Russia (1762–1796)
- Frederick the Great of Prussia (1740–1786)
- Louis XV (through his minister André-Hercule de Fleury) (1715–1774)
- Charles III of Spain (1734–1759 as King of Naples and Sicily and 1759–1788 as King of Spain)
- Frederick VI of Denmark (1808–1839)
- Gustav III of Sweden (1771–1792)
- Joseph II, Holy Roman Emperor (1765–1790)
- Joseph I of Portugal (through his minister, the Marquis of Pombal) (1750–1777)
- Maria Theresa (through his minister Wenzel Anton von Kranuitz) (1740–1780)
- Leopold I, Grand Duke of Tuscany (1765–1790)
- Ferdinand IV of Naples (through his minister Bernardo Tanucci) (1759–1825)
- Christian VII of Denmark (through his minister Johann Friedrich Struensee) (1770–1772)
- Philip, Duke of Parma (through his minister Guillaume du Tillot) (1748–1765)
- Francesco III d'Este, Duke of Modena (1737–1780)
- Ercole III d'Este, Duke of Modena (1780–1796)
- Charles Emmanuel III of Sardinia (through his minister Carlo Vincenzo Ferrero d'Ormea) (1730–1773)
- Victor Amadeus III of Sardinia (1773–1796)

== In other cultures ==
=== China ===
Xuezhi Guo contrasts the Confucian ideal of a "humane ruler" (renjun) with the ideal of Chinese legalists, who he says "intended to create a truly 'enlightened ruler' (mingjun) who is able to effectively rule the masses and control his bureaucracy"; this ruler would be a "skillful manipulator and successful politician who uses means or 'technique' in achieving self-protection and political control". Guo quotes Benjamin I. Schwartz as describing the features of "a truly Legalist 'enlightened ruler'":

He must be anything but an arbitrary despot if one means by a despot a tyrant who follows all his impulses, whims and passions. Once the systems which maintain the entire structure are in place, he must not interfere with their operation. He may use the entire system as a means to the achievement of his national and international ambitions, but to do so he must not disrupt its impersonal workings. He must at all times be able to maintain an iron wall between his private life and public role. Concubines, friends, flatterers and charismatic saints must have no influence whatsoever on the course of policy, and he must never relax his suspicions of the motives of those who surround him.

== See also ==
- Benevolent dictatorship
- Liberal autocracy
- Noblesse oblige
- Philosopher king
- Soft despotism
- Legal despotism
