= Kingdom of Loango =

c. 1550–1883 coastal kingdom in west Central Africa

Coordinates: 4°42′38″S 11°50′16″E

- c. 1550–c. 1883
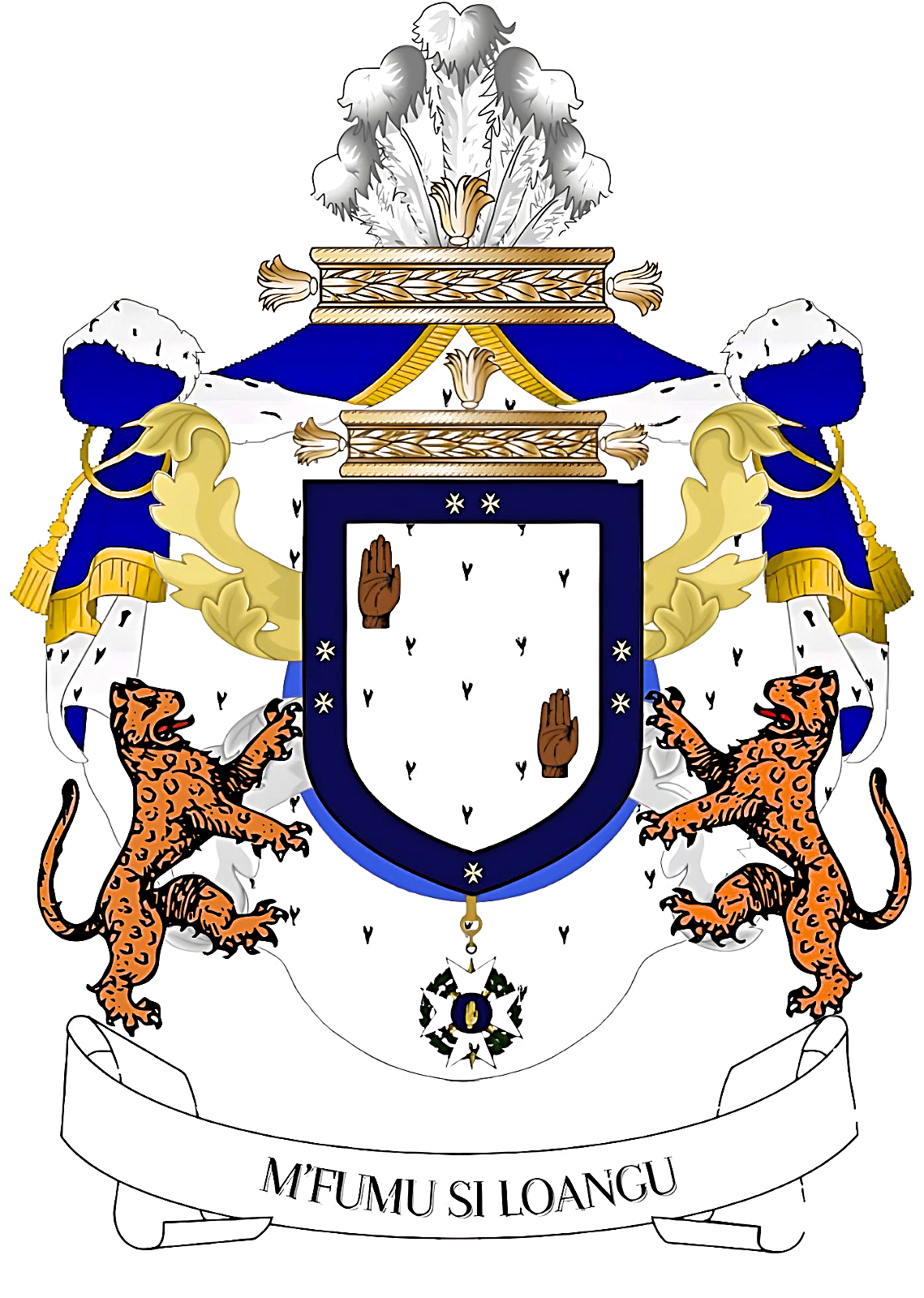
- Coat of arms

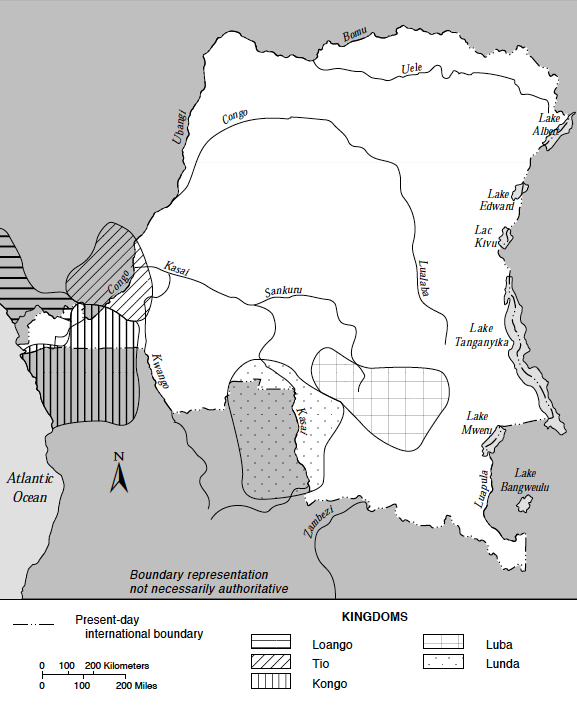
- Approximate location of the Kingdom of Loango in relation to the modern-day Republic of the Congo
- Capital: Buali (or Mbansa Loango)
- Common languages: Kikongo
- Religion: Bakongo
- Government: Monarchy
- History
  - Established: c. 1550
  - Disestablished: c. 1883
Preceded by	Succeeded by
Kingdom of Kongo	French Congo

The Kingdom of Loango (Note: (also Luangu, Luaangu, Lwaangu, Lwangu, Luango, Lwango, Luaango or Lwaango)) was a state created by Kongo people during approximately the 16th to 19th centuries in what is now the western part of the Republic of the Congo, Southern Gabon and Cabinda. Situated to the north of the more powerful Kingdom of Kongo, at its height in the 17th century Loango influence extended from Cape St Catherine in the north to almost the mouth of the Congo River. Loango ceased to exist during the 1800s African colonization by European forces.

Loango exported copper to the European market, and was a major producer and exporter of cloth.

The English traveller Andrew Battel, when he was there in about 1610, recorded that the predecessor of the unnamed king ruling at that time was "Gembe" or Gymbe (modernized as Njimbe), possibly the founder of the kingdom. With the death of King Buatu in 1787, the succession of leadership is uncertain.

== Name ==
The inhabitants, who are a branch of the Bakongo, spoke a northern dialect of the Kikongo language also spoken in the Kingdom of Kongo. Although the Vili eventually became the dominant political group, the Kingdom of Loango also included the Yombe, Kunyi, Lumbu, and Babongo Pygmies. Missionaries who visited the Loango coast at the end of the nineteenth century often called the people of Loango Bafiote, and their language Fiote. Their ethnic name today is usually given as Vili or Bavili. This term is attested as early as the seventeenth century, where it was usually spelled "Mobili" (plural Mobilis). This term is from the singular form (Muvili today) pluralized according to the rules of Portuguese.

The etymology of Loango remains uncertain. Frank Hagenbucher-Sacripanti states that “a state was established, which received the name Loango, a term denoting authority (Lwaangu: political command); the word ngo, meaning ‘panther’ in Kikongo and symbolizing strength and power, is said by some authors to be the origin of the term Kongo and of the many provincial and place names containing this syllable. It should be noted, however, that while this animal is called ngo in Kugni, it is called tchikummbu in Vili.” The term ngo is also attested in Kiyombe. Oral traditions collected during the twentieth century likewise refer to a common ancestress, Ngu Na, sometimes interpreted as a reference to the primordial forest.

== History ==
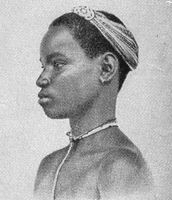
Loango girl

The origins of the kingdom are obscure. The most ancient complex society in the region was at Madingo Kayes, which was already a multi-site settlement in the first century CE. At present archaeological evidence is too scarce to say much more about developments until the late fifteenth or early sixteenth centuries.

Loango is not mentioned in early travelers' accounts of the region, nor is it mentioned in the titles of King Afonso I of Kongo in 1535, though Kakongo, Vungu, and Ngoyo are.

The earliest reference to Loango in a documentary source is a mention around 1561 by Sebastião de Souto, a priest in Kongo, that King Diogo I (1545–61) sent missionaries to convert Loango to Christianity. Duarte Lopes, ambassador from Kongo to the Holy See in Rome in 1585, related that "Loango is a friend of the King of Congo and it is said that he was a vassal in past times" which is consistent with Loango's origins from Kakongo, a vassal of Kongo.

Dutch visitors recorded the first traditional account of the kingdom's origin in the 1630s or '40s. In their account as reported by the geographer Olfert Dapper, the region where Loango would be constructed was populated by a number of small polities including Mayumba, Kilongo, Piri and Wansi, "each with their own leader" who "made war on each other." He recorded that the founder of Loango, who said he hailed from the district in Nzari in the small coastal kingdom of Kakongo, itself a vassal of Kongo, triumphed over his rivals through the skillful use of alliances to defeat those who opposed him, particularly Wansa, Kilongo and Piri, the latter two of which required two wars to subdue. Once this had been effected, however, a range of more northern regions, including Docke and Sette submitted voluntarily. Having succeeded in the conquest, the new king moved northward, founded settlements in a variety of places and eventually built his capital in Buali in the province of Piri (from which the ethnic name "Muvili" eventually derived).

The English traveller Andrew Battel wrote when he was there in about 1610, that the predecessor of the king ruling at that time was "Gembe" or "Gymbe" (modernized as "Njimbe"). A Dutch description published in 1625 said that a ruler who had died sometime before that date had ruled for 60 years and taken the throne around 1565. The documentary chronology thus makes it very likely that Njimbe was the founder and first ruler mentioned in the traditions, and this supposition is supported by traditions recorded around 1890 by R. E. Dennett which also named Njimbe as the first ruler.

On the basis of later traditions from the nineteenth and twentieth centuries linking the founding of Loango to that of Kongo, Phyllis Martin posited a much earlier foundation, the late fourteenth or early fifteenth centuries. She argues that the absence of Loango from early titles of the king of Kongo is evidence that Loango was already independent at that time.

=== Royal succession ===
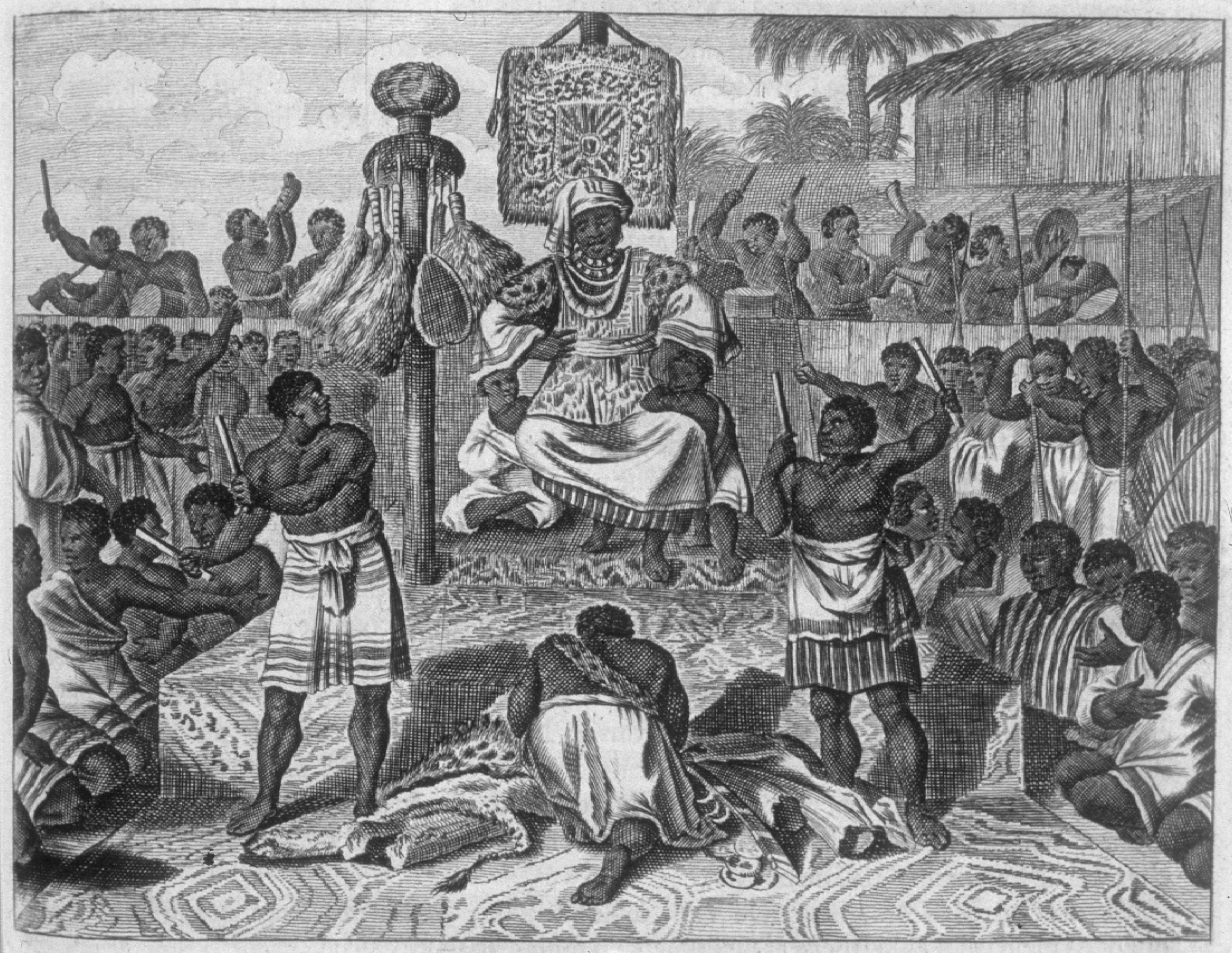
Trumpeters appear in a seventeenth-century depiction of the court of the King of Loango, a neighbouring Kongo kingdom, 1686

Njimbe had created a rule of succession which was in place around 1600, in which the king gave command over four provinces to members of his family, called the provinces of Kaye, Boke, Selage, and Kabango, and the king was to be chosen from a rotation between them. When the king died the ruler of Kaye took over, as he did indeed in the pre-1624 succession, and if the rule was followed then the ruler of Boke took his place; the other two provincial rulers advanced as well, and the king appointed a new ruler for Kabango.

In 1663, the king was baptized as Afonso by the Italian Capuchin priest Bernardo Ungaro, but there was considerable opposition to this from within the country, and indeed when he died, a non-Christian took over, but this one was himself overthrown by one of the Christian party in 1665. This civil war was still ongoing in the 1670s. In the aftermath of this civil war, a number of the Christian party fled to neighboring territories, one of whom, known to history as Miguel da Silva, was elected ruler of Ngoyo and was ruling there in 1682.

When Nathaniel Uring, an English merchant came to Loango to trade in 1701, he reported that the king had died and the power of the administration was in the hands of the "Queen or Chief Governess of that Country," named "Mucundy" and with whom he had to deal as if with the ruler. This title referred to a woman with a regular role in the administration as overseer of women's affairs.

Many years elapsed before Loango is mentioned again. During this time the rules of succession, whether formal or informal seem to have changed. When the French missionaries directed by Abbé Liévin-Bonaventure Proyart came to Loango in 1766, they noted that there was no clear succession to the throne, that anyone born of a person regarded as a princess (only female succession mattered) could aspire to the throne. Moreover, the death of a king was cause for a frequently long interregnum; the king ruling in 1766 had come to power only after an interregnum of seven years, during which time the affairs of the country were managed by a regent called Mani Boman. The Mani Boman was appointed by the king during his lifetime. Usually two were appointed to cover the eventuality of the death of one of the two. They, in turn received the petitions of a number of eligible candidates for the throne.

Eventually, the electors of the kingdom, who were those who held offices appointed by the late king, met to decide on the next king. In theory, as the old constitution maintained, the king named his successor as well and placed him as ruler of Kaye, to succeed him at his death, but as there was so much contention as to who should hold the position, the late king died without naming a Ma-Kaye.

Historian Phyllis Martin contends that the external trade of the country had enriched some members of the nobility ahead of others and had thus put pressure on the older constitution as wealthier upstart princes pressed their case forward. She argues that important members of the council were people who had obtained their positions through contact with external trade, particularly the slave trade, and they had come to share power with the king. She posits that this alteration in relative power allowed the council to dominate the king by forcing longer and longer interregna. In fact, after the death of King Buatu in 1787, no king was elected for over 100 years. However, to some extent royal authority remained in the hands of a person entitled the Nganga Mvumbi (priest of the corpse) who oversaw the body of the dead king awaiting burial. Several of these Nganga Mvumbi succeeded each other in the late eighteenth and through the nineteenth centuries.

Article about Vili clans

=== Administration and government ===
In theory the kings of Loango had absolute and even divine power. In the seventeenth century, the king appointed a number of provincial governors to office, choosing them from among his own family. Olifert Dapper's description of the government in about 1640 is the only comprehensive one in existence for the seventeenth century. The king ruled closely over a cluster of villages and small territories around the province of Loangogiri. Other districts lying further away were typically ruled by their own elite, and followed their own rules, but were overseen by officials from the court. Mayumba, Dingy and Chiloangatiamokango, for example were overseen by nobles appointed from the court, while Gobby was not under any royal supervision.

In the central district, each village or neighborhood was ruled by a noble appointed by the king, and in addition he had a substantial number of councilors, also appointed by him.

Reports on the government in the later eighteenth century show little change in the theory of Loango's government; royal despotism still had the feel of Divine Right, and his religious power was considerable. Free people within the country were obliged to pay taxes on their persons, the extent of land they cultivated, the number of slaves they possessed and the livestock they owned. Royally appointed officials governed at the provincial and village level; they collected taxes and carried out judicial tasks in the king's name. They sometimes overcharged the taxes, taking four goats for example, when they were only supposed to collect three. The royal council had a number of bureaucratic offices: Magovo and his associate Mapouto were in charge of foreign affairs, Makaka was the minister of war and commander of the army, Mfouka was the minister of commerce, and Makimba was the "grand master of waters and forests" as well as a number of others. Each minister in turn employed a number of slaves to carry out their tasks.

The king took a strong interest in the administration of justice. Much of his time was spent in hearing cases and resolving disputes, though the Abbot Proyart, who recorded these institutions believed that royal officials, acting in the king's name, often abused his decisions and made too many demands, inflicting "trouble and desolation on an entire province."

=== Religion ===
Dutch visitors of the first half of the seventeenth century left a detailed description of Loango's religion, especially as reported by Olfert Dapper. They noted that the people of Loango believed in God, whom they called "Sambian Ponge" (modern Kikongo: Nzambi a Mpungu) but he claimed they only knew his name and did not wish to know more about him.

Cosmology was not handed down from a centralized authority. For example, there were various opinions current in the seventeenth century concerning the fate of those who had died: some held they were reborn as in reincarnation, others that the soul simply ends, and others still that it becomes a deified "hero."

According to Dapper, for whom all African divine beings were manifestations of the Devil, their principal worship was devoted to what he called "field and house devils" (velt en huisduivelen) which they made "in various forms, and each had its own name." However, he also noted that an nkisi ("mokisie") was neither good nor bad, but a general term for all types of divinity. Although these deities had specific jurisdictions in the natural world, they were also localized to a particular place, though they might travel with people as well. New ones were made all the time, and they competed for authority, or people judged them effective or not according to their performance. Priests ("devil hunters" to Dapper) called "Enganga Mokisie" (modern Kikongo e nganga nkisi) used an elaborate ceremony to achieve possession by a divinity, and thus created a continuous revelation to identify a protector for a household or community.

He also provided descriptions of many other regional shrines. Thiriko was in a village of the same name; it was a large shrine made of a house shaped like a man, which protected the general welfare of that country. Nkisi had a square pouch of lion's skin filled with shells, stones, iron bells and other ingredients. It was portable; travelers and merchants carried such a pouch with them on their journeys. In the town of Kiko there was the nkisi called Lykikoo, which was a wooden statue in the shape of a man. He preserved the people of Kiko from death, and was able to make the dead do work for him. Malemba was in the form of a mat on which baskets full of various ingredients were hung, and which protected the health of the king. Other nkisi such as Makongo, Mimi, Kossie, Kitouba, Kymayi, Injami, Panza, Pongo, and Moanze were all equally regional or town shrines, typically including carved staffs, baskets and other items filled with the same sort of ingredients, shells, horns, vegetable material and the like that were characteristic of such shrines.

=== Christianity in Loango ===
Virtually from the beginning of its independent existence, Loango had an engagement with Christianity. Diogo I of Kongo sent missionaries to Loango during his reign (1545–61) which coincided with Loango's expansion and independence. According to an account of a priest in Diogo's court, the king and "all of his people" converted, as did the king's brother "Manilembo", a priest of "pagan idols." In 1583, Carmelite missionaries on their way to Loango were told that the king had sent to be baptized and to ask for missionaries for his people, a request that was repeated to Jesuits in 1603. Yet another Jesuit report noted the conversion of the country to Christianity in 1628.

In 1663, the Hungarian Capuchin priest, Padre Berdardino d'Ungheria baptized the king as Afonso and also 6,000 of his subjects. Upon his death there was a civil war, and an alternation of kings, but the Christian party was defeated in 1665.

Loango was again seeking Christianity in 1773 when French missionaries came to the country.

In spite of all these attempts, there was never a permanent, state sponsored Christian church in Loango as there was in Kongo. There is little doubt that some of the population was Christian including those who lived near Portuguese merchants, traders who had worked in Kongo and been converted there, and so on.

=== Judaism in Loango ===
From around the seventeenth century a black Jewish community was to be found on the Loango coast. It was first mentioned in 1777 and a more thorough description of the community was provided by the scientific works which were produced by the German Loango Expedition of 1873–76. This community had no links with Jewish communities elsewhere and has now disappeared. It was of considerable interest to race scientists during the period of the European Enlightenment.

=== The Loango-Vili diaspora ===
In the seventeenth century, Vili merchants were traveling some distance from their homeland in search of commercial opportunities. Among the earliest noted were voyages to copper mines in Mindouli and the territory of "Bukkameale" (perhaps the Niari Valley) where copper could be obtained. Early Dutch commercial records indicate that Loango exported considerable copper to the European market during this period. Loango was a major producer and exporter of cloth, both to the interior and to the Portuguese in Luanda, where thousands of meters of Loango cloth were imported in the early seventeenth century.

In the late seventeenth century and beyond, Vili merchants also engaged in the slave trade. Loango did not export many slaves in the earlier part of its contact with European merchants, but eventually the country did export slaves in considerable quantities. While some of these slaves were acquired locally, many more were acquired from various regions in the interior. An early slave trade led to the Kingdom of Kongo, where merchants there saw opportunities to export slaves to Dutch and English merchants and avoid taxes and regulations that hindered the market in Portuguese-controlled Luanda. Communities of Vili were reported in São Salvador, Kongo's capital in 1656, where some converted to Christianity. By 1683, they were operating in the Mbundu-speaking regions of eastern Angola; a treaty with Queen Verónica I (1683–1722) of Ndongo-Matamba specified that she would promise not to continue trading with them.

However, efforts on the part of Portugal to prevent their commercial contacts failed, and Vili communities could be found all over Kongo and Ndongo-Matamba as well as neighboring regions between them. In addition to buying and selling slaves, the Vili became involved in local industry, specializing in smithing.

Vili trade also extended inland into the lands of the Teke Kingdom and territories beyond that on the Congo River. By the late eighteenth centuries slaves from the "Bobangi" area beyond the Teke area were a significant percentage of exports.

Although European shippers visited Loango regularly, they did not establish a permanent presence in the form of factories, as happened in some other parts of Africa. Rather, shippers anchored off shore and made arrangement with local officials, the mafouks, who managed trade in the royal interest and kept direct European influence at arms' length. Mafouks also benefited commercially from the arrangements, and were at times able to influence royal policy toward them and toward trade.

== See also ==
- Kings of Loango
- Kingdom of Kongo
- Anziku Kingdom

== Sources ==
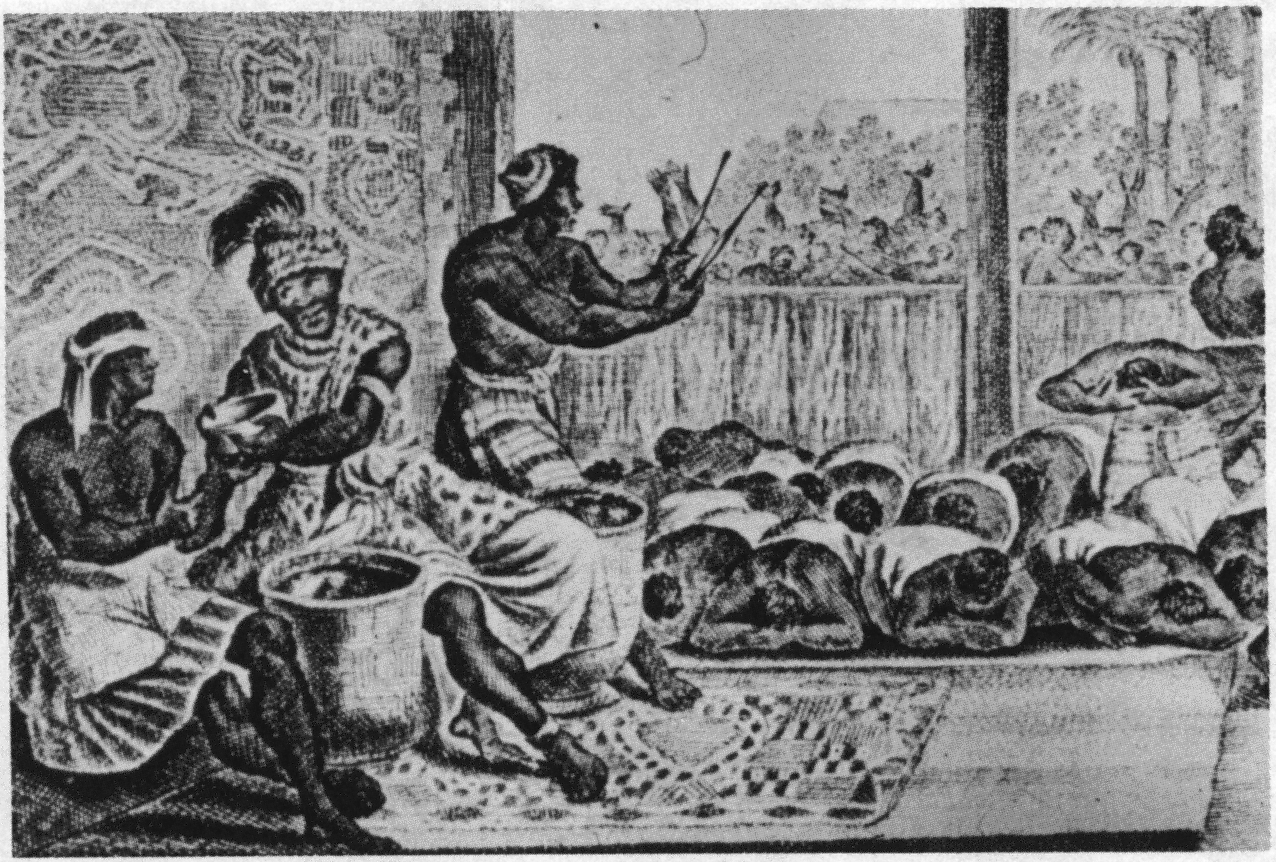
The court of N'Gangue M'voumbe Niambi, from the book Description of Africa (1668) by Olfert Dapper

- Martin, Phyllis (1972). The External Trade of the Loango Coast, 1576-1870: The Effects of Changing Commercial Relations on the Vili Kingdom of Loango. Oxford: Oxford University Press.
- Mertet, Annie (1991). Autour du Loango (XIVe-XIXe siècle): histoire des peuples du Sud-Ouest du Gabon au temps du royaume de Loango et du Congo français. Libreville: Centre Culturel Français de Libreville.
