= Governor Warner =

Governor Warner may refer to:

- Fred M. Warner (1865–1923), 26th Governor of Michigan
- Mark Warner (born 1954), 69th Governor of Virginia
- Thomas Warner (explorer) (1580–1649), Governor of Saint Christopher from 1623 to 1649, Governor of St. Kitts, Nevis, Barbados and Montserrat in 1625, and Governor of Antigua from 1632 to 1635
