= Legal despotism =

18th century physiocratic political doctrine

The concept of legal despotism (French: despotisme légal) formed part of the basis of the 18th-century French physiocrats' political doctrine, developed alongside their more popularly known (in modern day) economic thought. This political concept was first introduced by the èconomiste François Quesnay (1694–1774) in his 1767 treatise Despotism in China (French: Le despotisme de la Chine) and followed in development that same year by Pierre-Paul Lemercier (1719–1801) in his text, The Natural and Essential Order of Political Societies (L'Ordre naturel et essentiel des sociétés politiques).

The political form envisioned by Quesnay, Lemercier, and their associates was a unitary authority within a state with both executive and legislative powers endowed unto an despot restricted in power only by a judicial system of magistrates ensuring that the monarch is limited in actions only by legal interpretations of natural law, and understandings of political-economic rights such as liberty, property, and security. Besides the envisioned single tax (impôt unique) levied based on the productiveness of agricultural land, the legal despot would remain outside of the general domain of the economic sphere, leaving it be (laissez-faire) in accordance with stated natural laws.

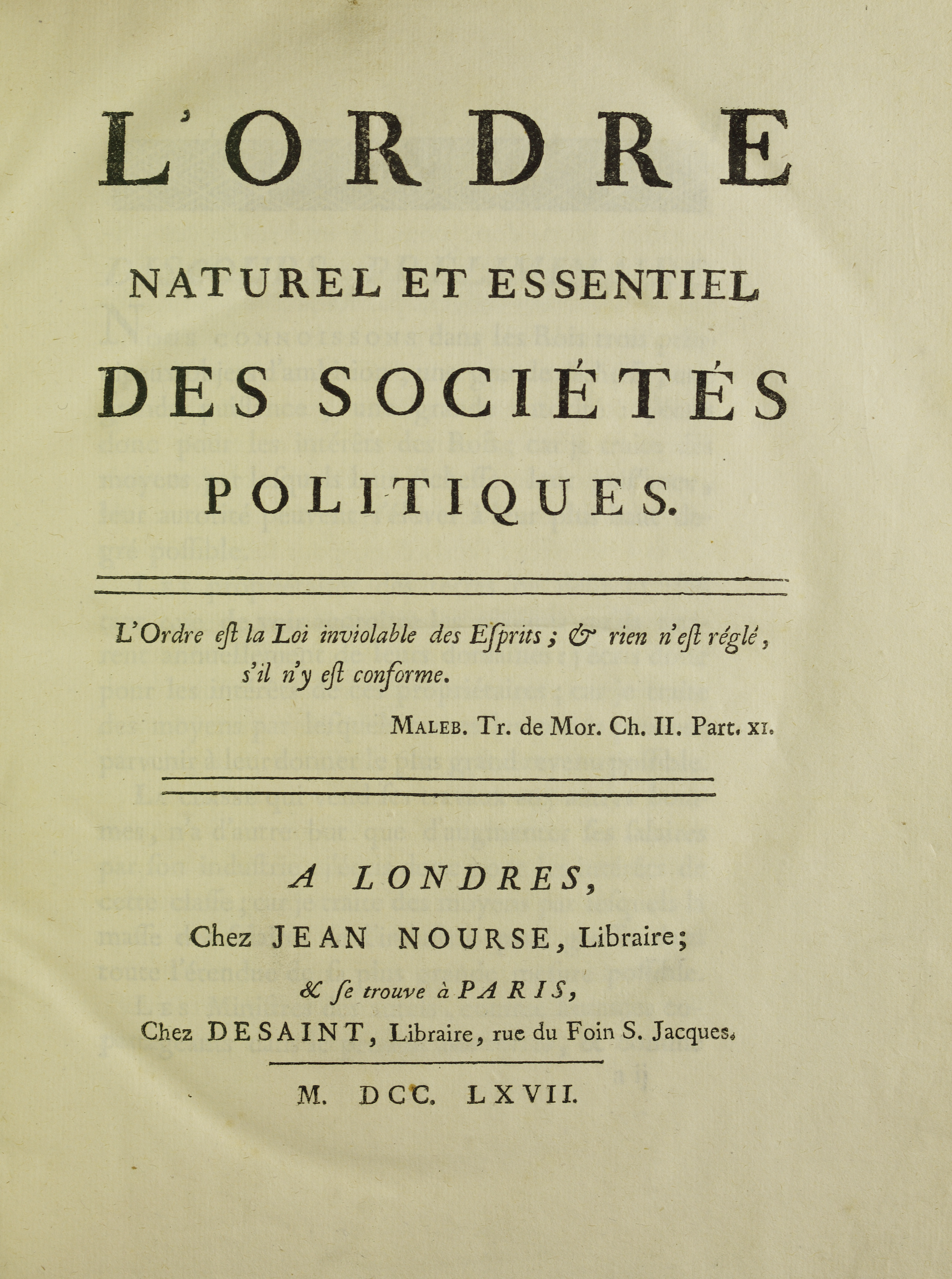
The Natural and Essential Order of Political Societies (1767), a major treatise by Pierre-Paul Lemercier on "legal despotism"

== Overview ==
=== Absolute rule ===
Physiocrats like Quesnay and Lemercier believed in a governmental system based around a despot who ruled in accordance with defined terms in natural law. Lemercier in his 1767 treatise likened absolute rule bound only by natural law towards a personification of Euclidean geometry:

Euclid is a true despot; and the geometrical truths which he has transmitted to us are truly despotic laws: their legal despotism and the personal despotism of this legislator are only one, that of the irresistible force of evidence: by this means, for centuries the despot Euclid has reigned without contradiction over all enlightened peoples; and he will not cease to exercise the same despotism over them, as long as he does not have contradictions to experience on the part of ignorance.

=== Legal (legitimate), versus arbitrary (illegitimate), despotism ===
In the opening of his treatise Despotism in China (1767), Quesnay notes the distinction he makes between:

- legitimate, legal despotism, where despotic rule is in accordance with specified natural laws and remains unhindered from outside their sovereign rule of law. The legal despot creates and enforces positive laws that do not violate any natural law.
- illegitimate, arbitrary despotism, where the despot is in association with and gives privilege and/or favors to certain social classes. The arbitrary despot creates and enforces positive laws that violate the physiocratic standard of natural law.

=== Legal power ensured by magistrates ===
To prevent the transformation of a legal despot into an arbitrary despot, their power was to be checked and balanced by the powers of magistrates performing judicial review on positive laws created by the despot. Lemercier in his 1767 work The Natural and Essential Order of Political Societies, proposes the powers of the judiciary to not just be in charge of checking the a priori control of the "laws to be made" but also to enforce an a posteriori control of the "laws made", thereby becoming the organ of government ensuring compliance from both the despot and society.

== Reception ==
The physiocrats' doctrine of legal despotism disseminated widely across European intellectual and administrative circles, with Lemercier's 1767 treatise becoming the center of physiocratic political propaganda. Rulers such as Catherine II of Russia sought Lemercier's personal advice, and the future King of Sweden Gustav III found inspiration from the text leading to his 1772 revolution against the Swedish estates.

=== Controversy ===
Genevan philosopher Jean-Jacques Rousseau in a 1767 letter to the physiocrat Marquis de Mirabeau, wrote:

Sir, whatever happens, don't talk to me any more about your legal despotism. I cannot taste it or even hear it; and I see only two contradictory words, which together mean nothing to me.

Fellow Frenchman Voltaire wrote in regard to the intellectual depth of legal despotism in his 1768 fable The Man of Forty Crowns (L'Homme aux quarante écus):

Bizarre expressions, such as those of legal despotism, had been used in a great number of works to express the government of an absolute sovereign who would conform all his wills to the demonstrated principles of political economy.

Voltaire also attacks the physiocrats' justifications for their single tax on land as derived from their conception of natural law:

I have read M. de la Rivière’s book. Perhaps it is because I cultivate a few acres of land myself that I am disinclined to see land alone burdened with taxes. I fear he may commit an error albeit with considerable wit.
