= Thomas Warner (explorer) =

Captain in the guards of James I of England (1580–1649)

Thomas Warner (1580 – 10 March 1649) was an English colonial official who served as the Governor of Saint Kitts from 1627 to 1649. The English colony he founded in Saint Kitts in 1624 is the oldest English settlement in the West Indies. The native Kalinago were massacred during his time as governor.

== Early life ==
Thomas Warner was from Suffolk, England. He became a member of King James VI and I's bodyguard. He was born around 1580, the younger son of William Warner and Margaret, daughter of George Jernegan of Belstead.

== Career ==
Warner participated in Roger North's failed English colony in Guyana in 1620.

An English mission to Saint Kitts arrived on 28 January 1624, and followed by a French mission in 1625. The French were led by Pierre Belain d'Esnambuc while the English were led by Warner and they arrived on opposite sides of the island. D'Enambuc and Warner agreed to return to their countries and discuss dividing the island. Warner returned with 400 men and a treaty signed on 13 May 1627, divided the island between France and England. The French suffered from high mortality and the English seized their colony. However, the French regained their colony in 1629. The settlement established by Warner is the oldest English settlement in the West Indies.

The French and English united to kill and expel the local inhabitants. The English killed many Kalinago at the Massacre at Bloody Point in January 1626, and the area became known as Bloody Point due to all of the blood that washed into the river.

James Hay, 1st Earl of Carlisle, the proprietary grantee, appointed Warner as governor for life of Saint Kitts in 1627. The overproduction of tobacco led to Warner and French Governor Phillippe de Longvilliers de Poincy agreeing to destroy the current crop and prohibit planting of tobacco for eighteen months.

== Personal life ==
Warner died on 10 March 1649. Warner's son Thomas Warner was made governor of Dominica. Warner married three times. He married his first wife, Sarah Snelling, daughter of Walter Snelling of Dorchester, on 9 July 1609. The couple had one son, Edward Warner, who later became the first governor of Antigua. Following her death, Warner married Rebecca Payne, daughter of Thomas Payne of Surrey, with whom he had two sons, including Philip Warner, who also later served as a governor of Antigua. His third marriage was to Anne Russell, who survived him and later remarried. Warner also had a relationship with a Kalinago (Carib) woman from Dominica, traditionally known as Obeah or OBarbe. Their son, Thomas "Indian" Warner, became a prominent leader and Governor of Dominica.

== See also ==
- History of Saint Kitts and Nevis

== Works cited ==
=== Books ===
- Roper, L., ed. (2018). The Torrid Zone: Caribbean Colonization and Cultural Interaction in the Long Seventeenth Century. University of South Carolina Press. ISBN 9781611178913.
- Taylor, Patrick; Case, Frederick, eds. (2013). The Encyclopedia of Caribbean Religions: Volume 1: A-L; Volume 2: M-Z. University of Illinois Press.

=== Journals ===
- Alexander, W. (1901). "St. Christopher, West Indies". Bulletin of the American Geographical Society. 33 (1). Taylor & Francis: 42–46. doi:10.2307/198557. JSTOR 198557.
- Guérin, Léon (1891). "The Foundation of the French Power in the West Indies - 1626-1664". Foreign and Commonwealth Office Collection. Foreign and Commonwealth Office Collection: 1–22. doi:10.2307/60231068. JSTOR 60231068.
- Niddrie, David (1966). "An Attempt at Planned Settlement in St. Kitts in the Early Eighteenth Century". Caribbean Studies. 5 (4). University of Puerto Rico, Río Piedras Campus: 3–11. doi:10.2307/25611906. JSTOR 25611906.
- Schreiber, Roy (1984). "An Attempt at Planned Settlement in St. Kitts in the Early Eighteenth Century". Transactions of the American Philosophical Society. 74 (7). University of Pennsylvania Press: 1–202. doi:10.2307/1006420. JSTOR 1006420.

Government offices
New creation	Governor of Saint Christopher; 1623–1649	Succeeded by Rowland Rich
New creation	Governor of Antigua; 1632–1635	Succeeded by Edward Warner
