= Olfert Dapper =

Dutch physician and writer (1636–1689)

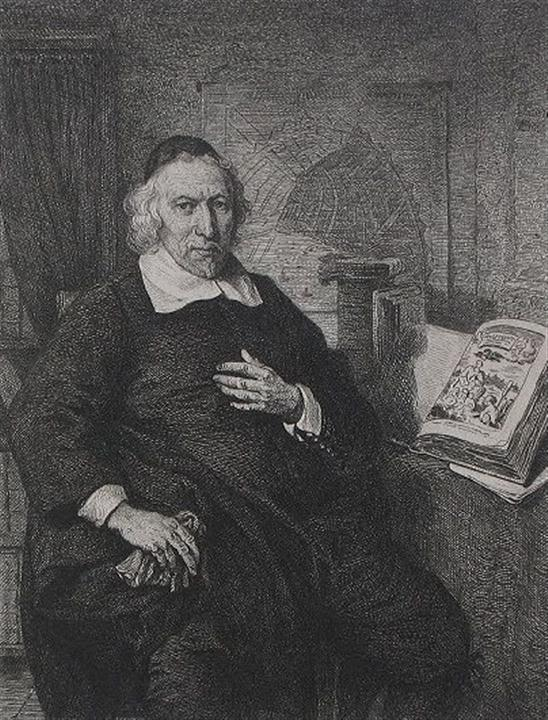
- Born: January 1636; Amsterdam, Dutch Republic
- Died: 29 December 1689 (aged 53); Amsterdam, Dutch Republic
- Occupations: Geographer, writer
- Writing career
- Subjects: History, geography

Olfert Dapper (January 1636 – 29 December 1689) was a Dutch physician and writer who wrote books about world history and geography although he never travelled outside the Netherlands.

== Biography ==
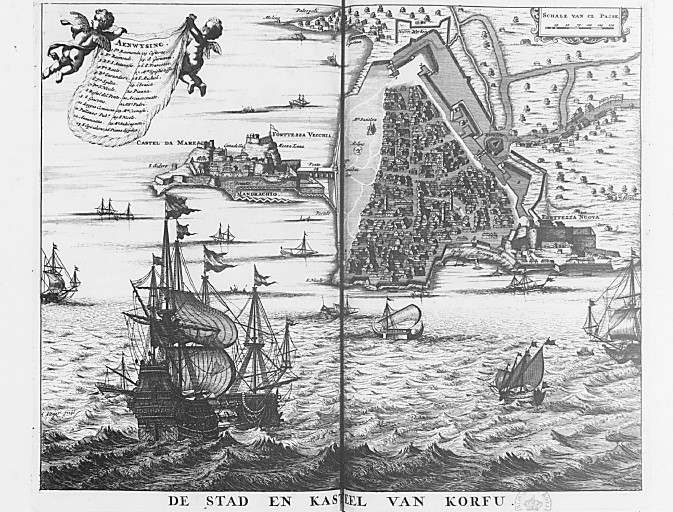
Illustration of the city and castle of Corfu, from Dapper's book Description of Morea (1688)

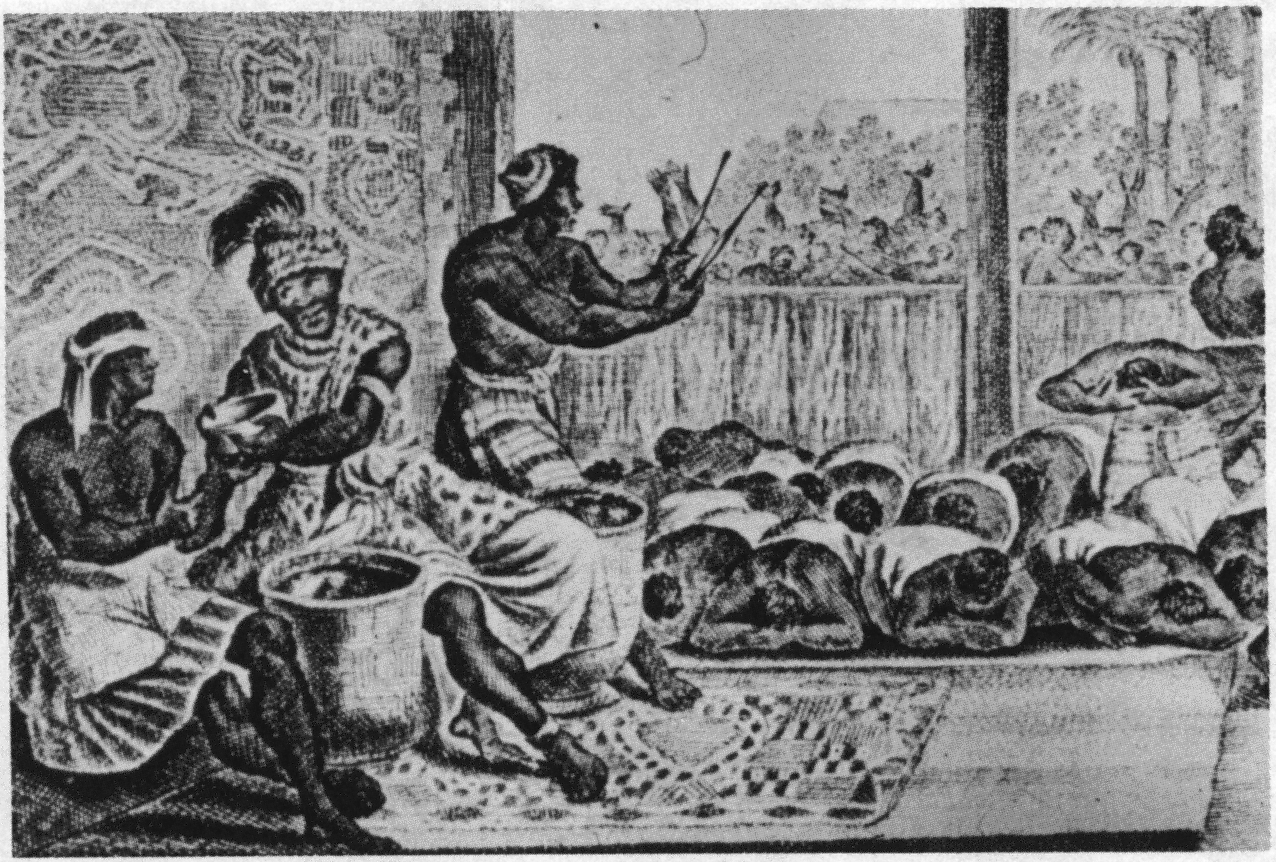
Illustration of the ruler of Loango, from Dapper's Description of Africa (1668)

Olfert Dapper was born in January 1636 in the Jordaan in Amsterdam. On 6 January 1636, he was baptized in the Lutheran church in Amsterdam.

In 1663 wrote a book on the history of Amsterdam. His Description of Africa (1668) is a key text for African studies. His book "is one of the most authoritative 17th-century accounts on Africa published in Dutch. Translations appeared in English, French, and German. Dapper never travelled outside the Netherlands but used reports by Jesuit missionaries and Dutch explorers. Within a few years, he published about China, India, Persia, Georgia and Arabia. His books became well-known in his own time. The fine plates include views of Algiers, Benin, Cairo, Cape Town, Valletta, Marrakesh, St. Helena, Tangier, Tripoli and Tunis, as well as animals and plants.

Dapper was buried on 29 December 1689 in Amsterdam.

== Influence ==
Dapper's book Description of Africa is an important text for Africanists.

In Amsterdam, the street Dapperstraat was named after him. The Dutch writer Willem Frederik Hermans wrote a book on him with the title Het Evangelie van O. Dapper Dapper (1973).

In Paris, the Musée Dapper named for him opened in 1986. Peter S. Beagle dedicated The Last Unicorn to Dapper for his reports of unicorns in Maine and in 2012 wrote a fictional account of Dapper's travels.

== Bibliography ==
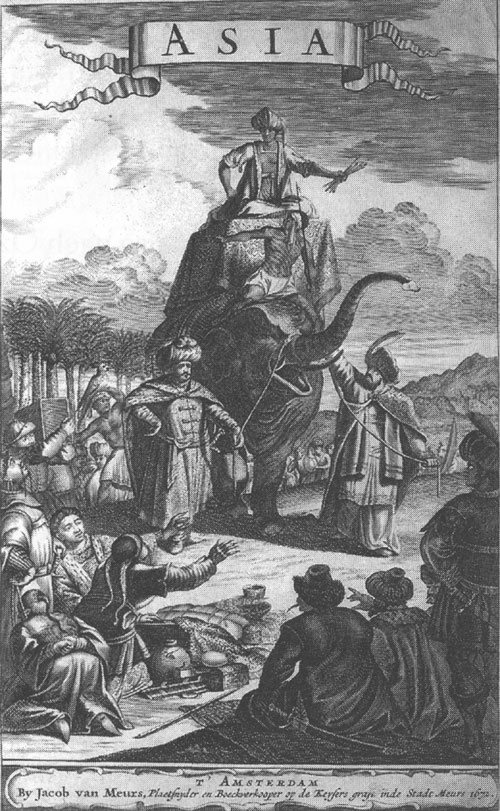
Illustration of people riding an elephant, from the 1681 German edition of the Dapper's Description of Asia (1680)

- Historische beschryving der Stadt Amsterdam : waer in de voornaemste geschiedenissen ... hier ter stede voor-gevallen zijn, verhandelt, en ... in meer als tzeventigh kopere platen ... vertoont worden (1663)
- Naukeurige Beschrijvingen der Afrikaensche gewesten. 1668 – via Internet Archive. + Index
- Naukeurige beschrijvinge der Afrikaensche Eylanden (1668)
- Gedenkwaerdig bedryf der Nederlandsche Oost-Indische Maetschappye, op de kuste en in het Keizerrijk van Taising of Sina: behelzende het 2e gezandschap aen den Onder-Koning Singlamong ... Vervolgt met een verhael van het voorgevallen des jaers 1663 en 1664 op de kuste van Sina ... en het 3e gezandschap aan Konchy, Tartarsche Keizer van Sina en Oost Tartarye ... beneffens een beschryving van geheel Sina (1670)
- Asia, of naukeurige beschryving van het rijk des Grooten Mogols, en een groot gedeelte van Indiën: ... beneffens een volkome beschryving van geheel Persie, Georgie, Mengrelie en andere gebuur-gewesten ... verciert doorgaens met verscheide afbeeldingen in kooper gesneden (1672)
- Naukeurige beschrijving van gantsch Syrie, en Palestyn of Heilige lant; ... beneffens de landen van Perea of Over-Jordaen, Galilea, byzonder Palestyn, Judea en Idumea: ... verrijkt met lantkaerten en afbeeldingen der voornaemste steden, en gedenkwaerdighste gebouwen (1677)
- Naukeurige beschryving van Asie : behelsende de gewesten Mesopotamie, Babylonie, Assyrie, Anatolie of Klein Asie : beneffens eene volkome beschrijving van gansch ... Arabie (1680)
- Naukeurige beschrijving van Morea, eertijts Peloponnesus; en de eilanden, gelegen onder de kusten van Morea, en binnen en buiten de Golf van Venetien; waer onder de voornaemte Korfu, Gefalonia, Sant Maura, Zanten, en andere in grooten getale (1688)
- Naukeurige beschryving der Eilanden, in de Archipel der Middelantsche Zee, en omtrent dezelve, gelegen: waer onder de voornaemste Cyprus, Rhodus, Kandien, Samos, Scio, Negroponte (1688)

== See also ==
- Filippo Pigafetta
