= The Man of Forty Crowns =

1768 fable written by Voltaire

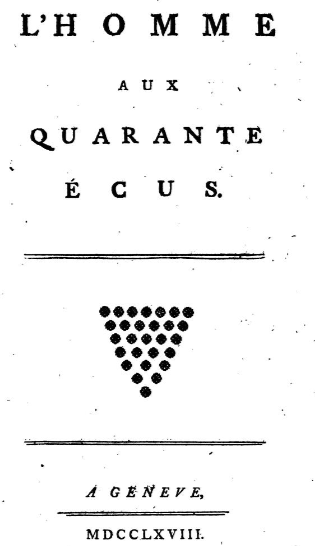
- Author: Voltaire
- Original title: L'Homme au quarante écus
- Language: French
- Subject: Philosophy
- Genre: Collection of essays
- Publication date: 1768
- Publication place: France

The Man of Forty Crowns (French: L'Homme aux quarante écus) is a fable written by Voltaire.
