= N'Gangue M'voumbe Niambi =

King of Loango

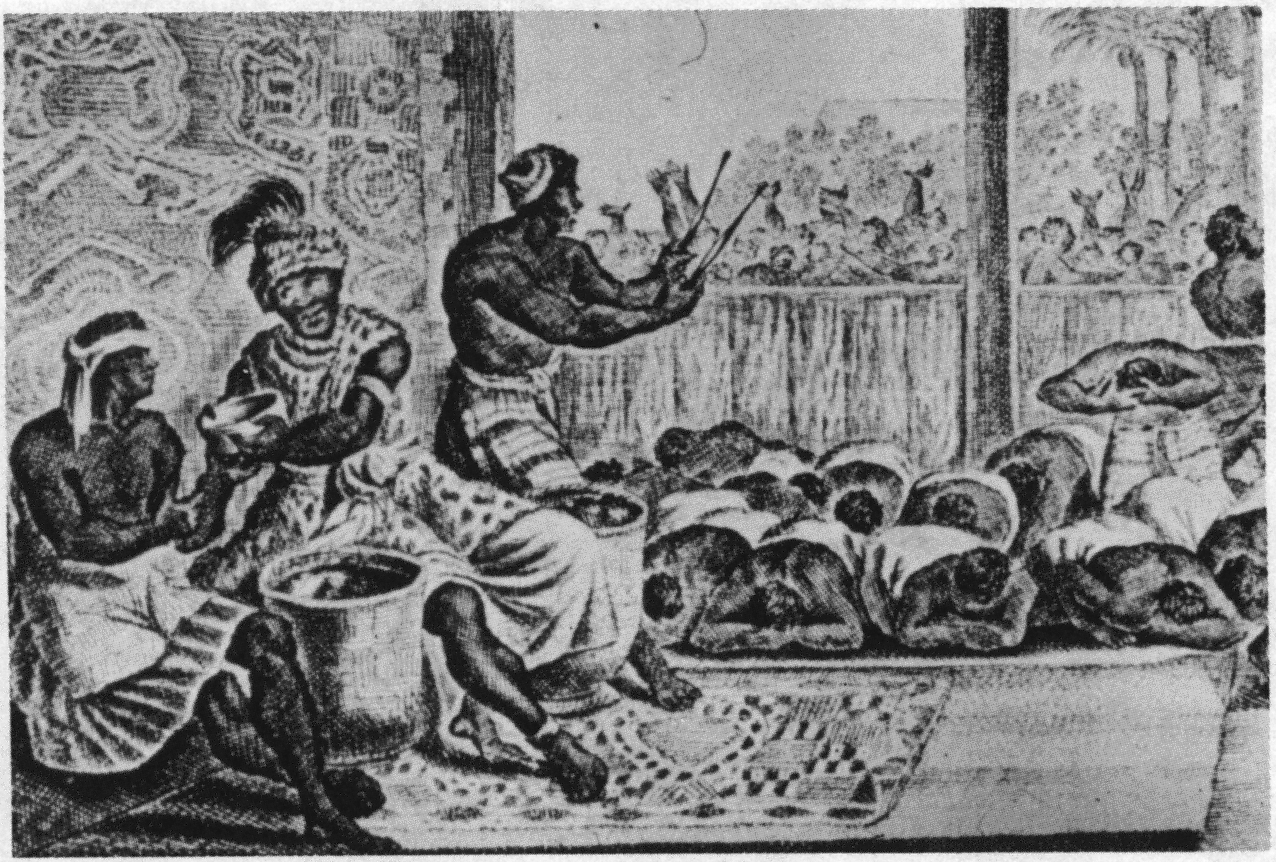
The court of N'Gangue M'voumbe Niambi

N'Gangue M'voumbe Niambi was the king of Loango in the latter half of the 17th century. He profited from the Portuguese slave trade, which had recently begun. Olfert Dapper reported that Niambi possessed several firearms, although he didn't know how to use them.
