= Nathaniel Uring =

English merchant and Deputy-Governor of Saint Lucia in 1722

Nathaniel Uring was an English merchant who served as deputy-governor of Saint Lucia during a failed colonial venture backed by John Montagu, 2nd Duke of Montagu from 1722 to 1723. Uring was involved in the Atlantic slave trade and travelled to Guinea and Mosquito Coast during his life.

== Early life ==
Nathaniel Uring was born in Walsingham, England, in 1680/1681, to a family of Quakers. From 1689 to 1699, he was on a slave ship that sailed to Barbados and Virginia.

== Career ==
In 1701, Uring signed on as a second mate for Martha, which would sail from London to Guinea to collect slaves. The captain died during the voyage.

In 1711, Uring visited Black River on the Mosquito Coast after being shipwrecked. He lived along the Belize River for a few months in 1720. In 1723, Uring became shipwrecked along the Honduran coast. He walked from Cabo Gracias a Dios to Cabo Camarón. Uring returned to Walsingham and opened a wine importing business.

John Montagu, 2nd Duke of Montagu was granted the islands of Saint Lucia and Saint Vincent. Montagu appointed Uring as deputy-governor and sent him to colonise the area in 1722. He arrived on Saint Lucia with two governors, 51 officers, and 425 other men on 28 December 1722. The day that Uring arrived France ordered him to leave the island and 1,400-2,000 French men from Martinique and Guadaloupe arrived in January 1723. The English only had 80 men who were fit for combat. On 8 January, an agreement was reached for both sides to leave the island. The expedition cost £40,000.

== Works ==
- Uring, Nathaniel (1725). A relation of the late intended settlement of the islands of St. Lucia and St. Vincent in America: in right of the Duke of Montagu, and under His Grace's direction and orders, in the year 1722. London [England]: Printed for J. Peele, at Locke's Head in Pater-noster Row.
- Uring, Nathaniel (1726). A history of the voyages and travels of Captain Nathaniel Uring: with new draughts of the Bay of Honduras and the Caribbee Islands, and particularly of St. Lucia, and the harbour of Petite Carenage, into which ships may run in bad weather, and be safe from all winds and storms : very useful for masters of ships that use the Leeward Island trade, or Jamaica. London: Printed by W. Wilkins, for J. Peele ...

== See also ==
- List of colonial governors and administrators of Saint Lucia

== Works cited ==
=== Books ===
- Maguire, Richard (2021). Africans in East Anglia, 1467-1833. Boydell & Brewer. ISBN 9781800103160.
- Murphy, Tessa (2021). The Creole Archipelago: Race and Borders in the Colonial Caribbean. University of Pennsylvania Press. ISBN 9780812299977.

=== Journals ===
- Dawson, Frank (1983). "William Pitt's Settlement at Black River on the Mosquito Shore: A Challenge to Spain in Central America, 1732-87". The Hispanic American Historical Review. 63 (4). Duke University Press: 677–706. doi:10.2307/2514901. JSTOR 2514901.
- Dixon, Clifton (1985). "Coconuts and Man on the North Coast of Honduras". Yearbook. 11. University of Texas Press: 17–21. doi:10.2307/25765646. JSTOR 25765646.
- Humphreys, R. (1968). "Presidential Address: Anglo-American Rivalries in Central America". Transactions of the Royal Historical Society. 18. Cambridge University Press: 174–208. doi:10.2307/3678960. JSTOR 3678960.
- O'Callaghan, E. (1888). "Seven British captures of St. Lucia". Foreign and Commonwealth Office Collection. Foreign and Commonwealth Office Collection: 1–20. doi:10.2307/60232586. JSTOR 60232586.
