= Pierre-Paul Lemercier de La Rivière de Saint-Médard =

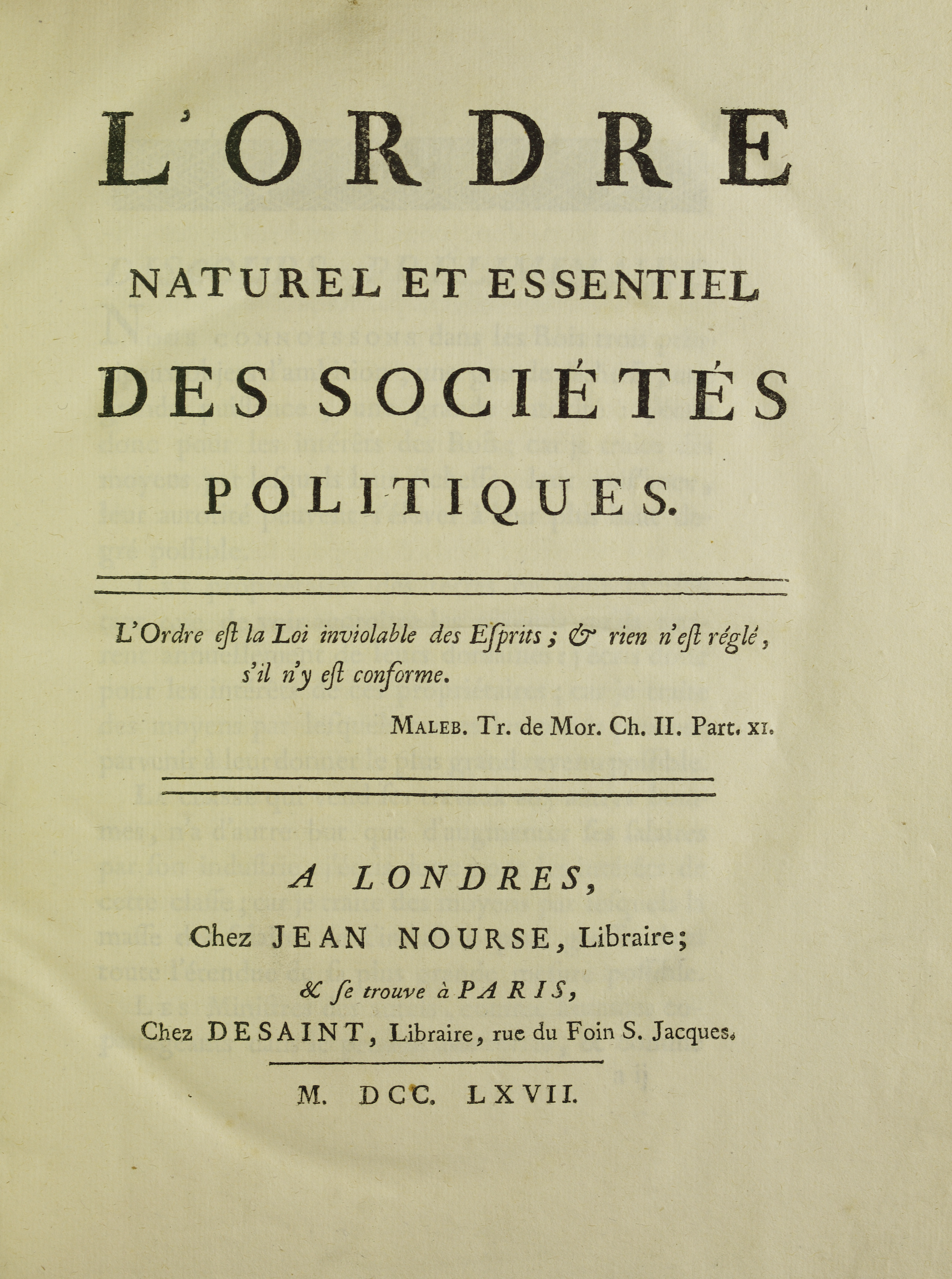
Ordre naturel et essentiel des sociétés politiques, 1767

Pierre-Paul Le Mercier de La Rivière (10 March 1719 – 27 November 1801) was a French colonial administrator and physiocrat economist. Mercier was a councilor at the Parlement of Paris, intendant at Martinique in the West Indies (1759-1764), and noted advocate of Physiocracy. In 1774, Mercier wrote a letter to Benjamin Franklin proposing to purchase 5,000 tons of Philadelphia flour.

He was born at Saumur, (Maine-et-Loire) and died in 1801 in Grigny, Essonne
