= Foreign and Commonwealth Office Collection =

The Foreign and Commonwealth Office Collection was formed by instruction from the Secretary of State for the Colonies on 23 April 1890 to all territories under his authority. The intention was to have a record of all Colonial Postage and revenue stamps, postcards, embossed envelopes and newspaper wrappers. The collection contains single examples of the stamps in use at that time as well as some obsolete issues and single copies, usually from first printings, from 1890. Variations such as colour varieties and alternate watermarked papers are included.

When the collection was closed in 1992, it was transferred British Library, Philatelic Collections.

== Scope ==
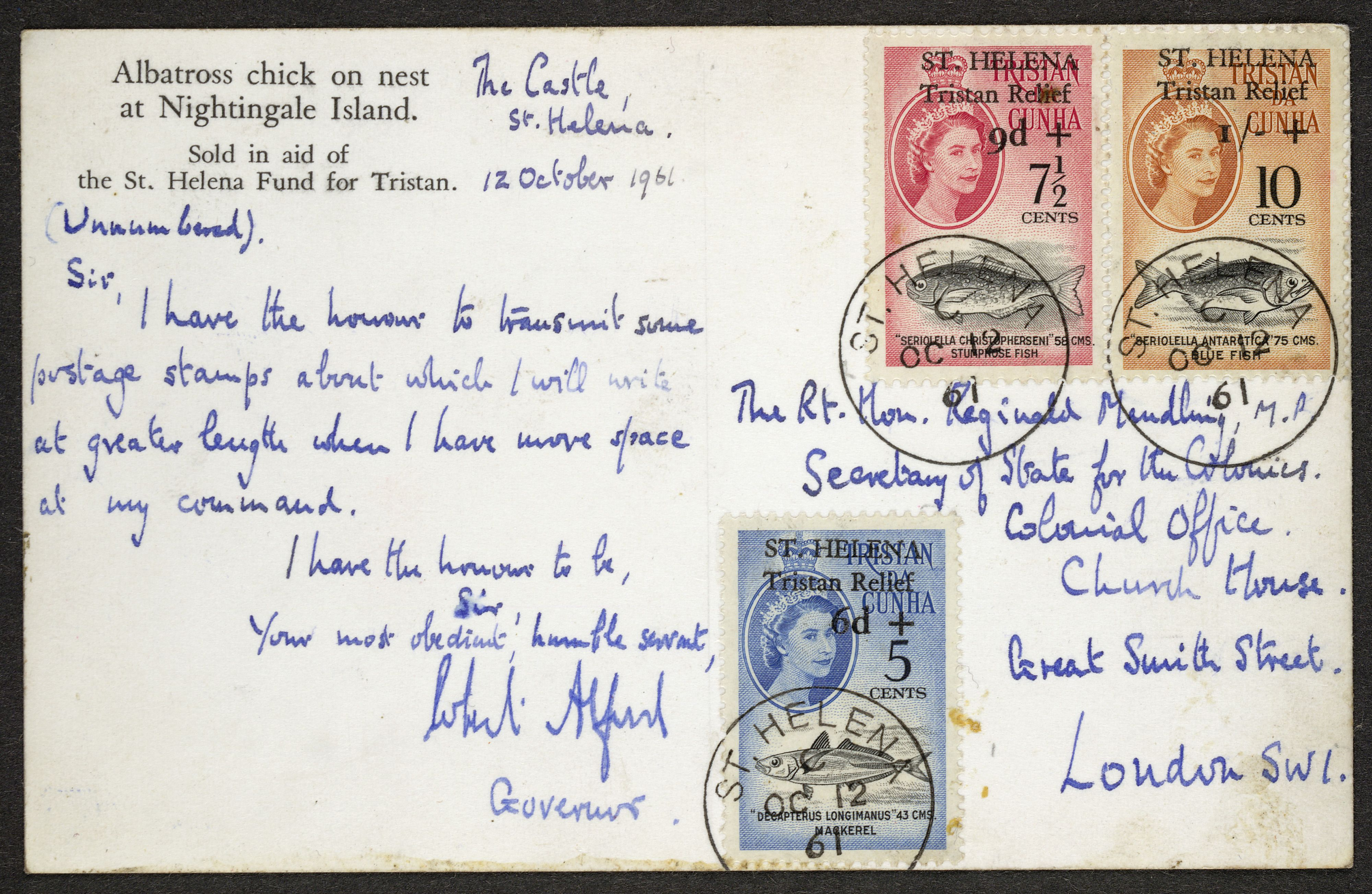
St Helena stamps fund-raising for the island of Tristan da Cunha disaster in 1961, issued without authority of the Colonial Office and withdrawn. Full size image here.

There is a full range of revenue stamps, as issued to the territories, for the King George VI and Queen Elizabeth II reigns. In addition there is an extensive selection of postage due labels. Many of the stamps in the Collection are further identified by a date showing when they were received by the Colonial Office. As well as postcards, embossed envelopes and newspaper wrappers there are registered envelopes, air letter forms, reply postcards, and examples of paper money and postal orders. Many items are annotated with the date of receipt by the Colonial Office.

The collection consist of three ledgers into which stamps have been stuck down, preventing the examination of watermarks, and a further 36 boxes of postal stationery.

== Tristan da Cunha relief stamps ==
The authorities in St Helena created stamps to raise money for the island of Tristan da Cunha after the population was evacuated due to volcanic activity in 1961. This was mistakenly done without approval of the Colonial Office and the issue was withdrawn. A post card, bearing three of the four values in the set, sent by the Governor of St Helena to "The Rt. Hon. Reginald Maudling, MP, Secretary of State for the Colonies" informing him of the new stamps is in the collection and is considered among the rarest items as only 434 sets of stamps were sold before being withdrawn.

== Representative items ==
A representative sample showing the international scope of the collection includes:

- Bermuda: 1936 King George V 12/6d Revenue stamp approved for postal use
- Hong Kong: 1874 Queen Victoria $10 rose-carmine fiscal stamp
- Gold Coast: 1889 Queen Victoria 20s green and red
- Natal: 1902-03 King Edward VII Revenue £20 red and green
- Malaya: Perak 1895-99 $25 green and orange
- Nyasaland (now Malawi): 1908-11 King Edward VII £10 purple and ultramarine and King George V £10 purple and ultramarine
