= Kingdom of Kongo =

1390–1914 state in Central Africa; Portuguese vassal from 1857

Kingdom of Kongo: Wene wa Kongo/Kongo dya Ntotila (Kongo); Reino do Congo (Portuguese); Regnum Congo (Latin)
- 1390–1914
- Flag according to Giovanni Cavazzi da Montecuccolo, 1650s Coat of arms of Afonso I (c. 1528–1541)

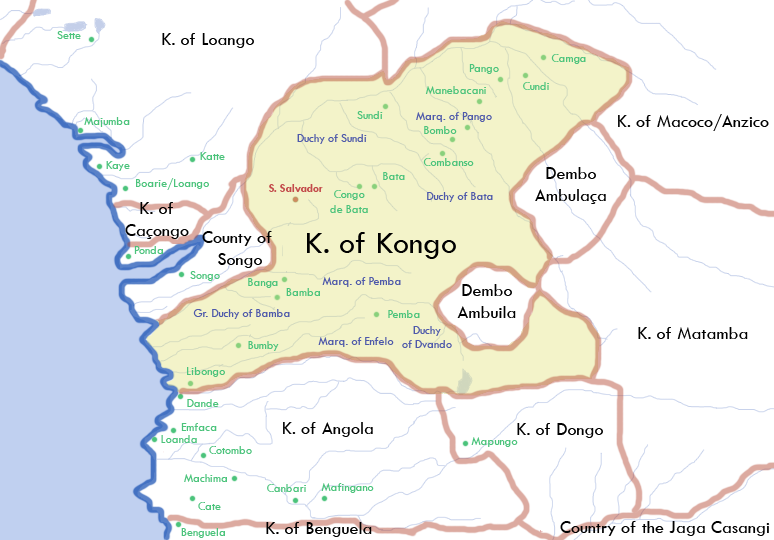
- The Kingdom of Kongo in 1711
- Status: Sovereign kingdom (1390–1857); Vassal of the Kingdom of Portugal (1857–1910); Subject of the First Portuguese Republic (1910–1914)
- Capital: São Salvador (today M'banza-Kongo, Angola) (Note: M'banza-Kongo, named São Salvador in the late-16th century; reverted to the name M'banza-Kongo in 1975)
- Common languages: KiKongo; Portuguese; Latin
- Religion: Roman Catholicism (state religion); Bukongo; Antonianism (1704–1708)
- Government: Constitutional Elective Monarchy
- Manikongo
  - c. 1390–1420 (first): Lukeni lua Nimi (Note: Lukeni lua Nimi is also spelt as Nimi a Lukeni. The name Nimi a Lukeni appeared in later oral traditions, and some modern historians, notably Jean Cuvelier, popularised it.)
  - 1911–1914 (last): Manuel III of Kongo
- Legislature: Ne Mbanda-Mbanda
- History
  - Conquest of Kabunga: 1390
  - Christianisation: 3 May 1491
  - Battle of Mbumbi: 1622
  - Battle of Mbanda Kasi: 1623
  - Battle of Mbwila: 29 October 1665
  - Kongo Civil War: 1665–1709
  - Reunification: February 1709
  - Vassalage: 1857
  - Berlin Conference: 1884–1885
  - Abolishment: 1914

Area
- 1623: 129,400 km^{2} (50,000 sq mi)

Population
  - 1623: 790,000
- Currency: Nzimbu shells and Lubongo (Libongo, Mbongo), Mpusu cloth
Preceded by
Mpemba Kasi
Mbata Kingdom
Vungu
Mpemba
Seven Kingdoms of Kongo dia Nlaza
Succeeded by
International Congo Association
Portuguese West Africa
French Congo
- Today part of: Angola; Democratic Republic of the Congo; Republic of the Congo

The Kingdom of Kongo (Kongo: Kongo Dya Ntotila or Wene wa Kongo; Portuguese: Reino do Congo; Latin: Regnum Congo) was a kingdom in Central Africa. It was located in present-day northern Angola, the western portion of the Democratic Republic of the Congo, southern Gabon and the Republic of the Congo. At its greatest extent it reached from the Atlantic Ocean in the west to the Kwango River in the east, and from the Congo River in the north to the Kwanza River in the south. The kingdom consisted of several core provinces ruled by the Manikongo, the Portuguese version of the Kongo title Mwene Kongo, meaning "lord or ruler of the Kongo kingdom", and its sphere of influence extended to neighbouring kingdoms, such as Ngoyo, Kakongo, Loango, Ndongo, and Matamba, the latter two located in what became Angola.

From c. 1390 to 1862, it was an independent state. From 1862 to 1914, it functioned intermittently as a vassal state of the Kingdom of Portugal. In 1914, following the Portuguese suppression of a Kongo revolt, Portugal abolished the titular monarchy. The title of King of Kongo was restored from 1915 until 1975, as an honorific without real power. The remaining territories of the kingdom were assimilated into the colony of Portuguese Angola and the Independent State of the Congo respectively. The modern-day Bundu dia Kongo sect favours reviving the kingdom through secession from Angola, the Republic of the Congo, and the Democratic Republic of the Congo.

== History ==
Oral traditions about the early history of the country were set in writing for the first time in the late 16th century. Especially detailed versions were recorded in the mid-17th century, which include those written by the Italian Capuchin missionary Giovanni Cavazzi da Montecuccolo. Traditions about the foundation changed over time, depending on historical circumstances.

Modern research into oral tradition, including recording them in writing, began in the 1910s with Mpetelo Boka and Lievan Sakala Boku writing in KiKongo. These records were extended by such Redemptorist missionaries as Jean Cuvelier and Joséph de Munck. In 1934, Cuvelier published a KiKongo language summary of these traditions in Nkutama a mvila za makanda. Although Cuvelier and other scholars contended that these traditions applied to the earliest period of Kongo's history, it is more likely that they relate primarily to local traditions of clans (makanda) and especially to the period following 1750.

=== Foundation ===
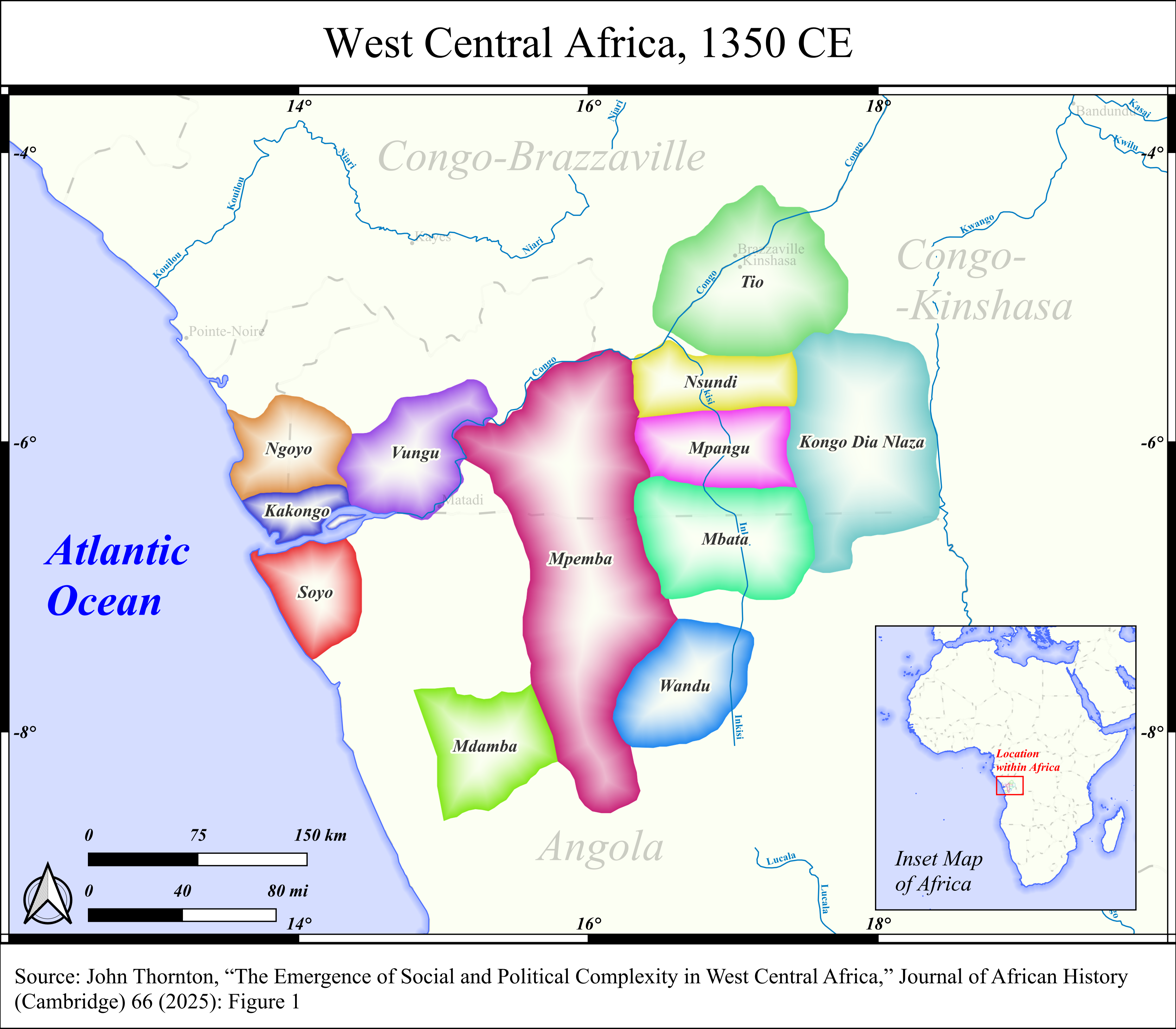
States of the western Congo Basin, c. 1350

By the 13th century there were three main federations of states in the western Congo Basin. In the east were the Seven Kingdoms of Kongo dia Nlaza, considered to be the oldest and most powerful, which likely included Nsundi, Mbata, Mpangu, and possibly Kundi and Okanga. South of these was Mpemba. It included various kingdoms such as Mpemba Kasi and Vunda. To its west across the Congo River was a confederation of three small states; Vungu (its leader), Kakongo, and Ngoyo.

According to Kongo tradition in the seventeenth century, the kingdom's origin was in Vungu, which had extended its authority across the Congo to Mpemba Kasi, which was itself the northernmost territory of Mpemba, whose capital was located about 150 miles south. A dynasty of rulers from this small polity built up its rule along the Kwilu Valley, or what was called Nsi a Kwilu, and its elite are buried near its centre. Traditions from the 17th century allude to this sacred burial ground. According to the missionary Girolamo da Montesarchio, an Italian Capuchin who visited the area from 1650 to 1652, the site was so holy that looking upon it was deadly. These rocks may be the rugged uplands of Lovo where there is extensive cave and rock art that dates from at least the fifteenth century.

The Kingdom of Kongo was founded around 1390 through the political marriage between the two KiKongo speaking peoples; Nima a Nzima, ruler of the Mpemba Kasi and Vungu, and Lukeni lua Nsanze ("Luqueni Luansanze"), daughter of Nsaku lau, the ruler of the neighbouring Mbata Kingdom. At some point around 1375, Nimi a Nzima started this alliance with Nsaku lau. This marital alliance guaranteed that each of the two allies would help ensure the succession of its ally's lineage in the other's territory. Mbata in turn was a former province of the Seven Kingdoms of Kongo dia Nlaza, whose capital lay farther east along the current border of Angola and Democratic Republic of Congo. Mbata may have been the senior partner in the original alliance, as he had the title of "Nkaka andi a Mwene Kongo," or grandfather of the king of Kongo.

Nimi a Nzima and Lukeni lua Nsanze's son, Lukeni lua Nimi (circa 1380–1420), began the expansion that would found the Kingdom of Kongo. Lukeni lua Nimi led expansion southward into lands ruled by Mpemba. He established a new base on the mountain Mongo dia Kongo and made alliances with the Mwene Mpangala, ruler of a market town then loyal to Mpemba and also with the Mwene Kabunga whose lands lay west of there of uncertain loyalty and the site of a shrine. Two centuries later the Mwene Kabunga's descendants still symbolically challenged the conquest in an annual celebration. He furthered this with a second more important alliance with Vunda, another of Mpemba's subordinate rulers. To cement this alliance, as with the one with Mbata, Lukeni lua Nimi allowed Vunda to be an elector to the kingdom.

After the death of Lukeni lua Nimi, the rulers that followed Lukeni claimed relation to his kanda (lineage), and were known as the Kilukeni. The Kilukeni kanda — or "house", as it was recorded in Portuguese language documents written in Kongo — ruled Kongo unopposed until 1567.

=== Expansion and early development ===
The 16th-century tradition said that the former kingdoms "in ancient times had separate kings, but now all are subjects and tributaries of the king of Congo." Tradition noted that in each case, the governorship was given to members of the royal family or other noble families. Governors who served terms determined by the king had the right to appoint their own clients to lower positions, down to villages who had their own locally chosen leadership. As this centralisation increased, the allied provinces gradually lost influence until their powers were only symbolic, manifested in Mbata, once a co-kingdom. By 1620 it was simply known by the title "Grandfather of the King of Kongo" (Nkaka'ndi a Mwene Kongo).

The kingdom of the Kongo's early campaigns of expansion brought new populations under the kingdom's control and produced many war captives. Starting in the 14th century (and reaching its height in the 17th century), the kings of the Kongo forcibly relocated captured peoples to the royal capital at M'banza-Kongo. The resulting high concentration of population around M'banza-Kongo and its outskirts played a critical role in the centralisation of Kongo. The capital was a densely settled area in an otherwise sparsely populated region where rural population densities probably did not exceed 5 persons per km^{2}. Early Portuguese travellers described M'banza-Kongo as a large city, the size of the Portuguese town of Évora as it was in 1491. By the end of the sixteenth century, Kongo's population was probably over half a million people in a core region of some 130,000 square kilometres. By the early seventeenth century the city and its hinterland had a population of around 100,000, or nearly one out of every six inhabitants in the Kingdom (according to baptismal statistics compiled by a Jesuit priest in 1623), while the kingdom as a whole numbered some 780,000.

The concentration of population, economic activity, and political power in M'banza-Kongo strengthened the Kongolese monarchy and allowed for a centralised government. Captives taken in war were enslaved and integrated into the local population, producing a food and labour surplus, while rural regions of the kingdom paid taxes in the form of goods the capital could not produce itself. A class of urban nobility developed in the capital, and their demand for positions at court and consumer goods fuelled the kingdom's economy. Rural development was intentionally discouraged by the Kongolese king, ensuring the capital remained the economic and political centre of the kingdom. This concentration allowed resources, soldiers and surplus foodstuffs to be readily available at the request of the king and made the king overwhelmingly powerful when compared to any potential rival.

==== Contact with Portugal and Christianisation ====
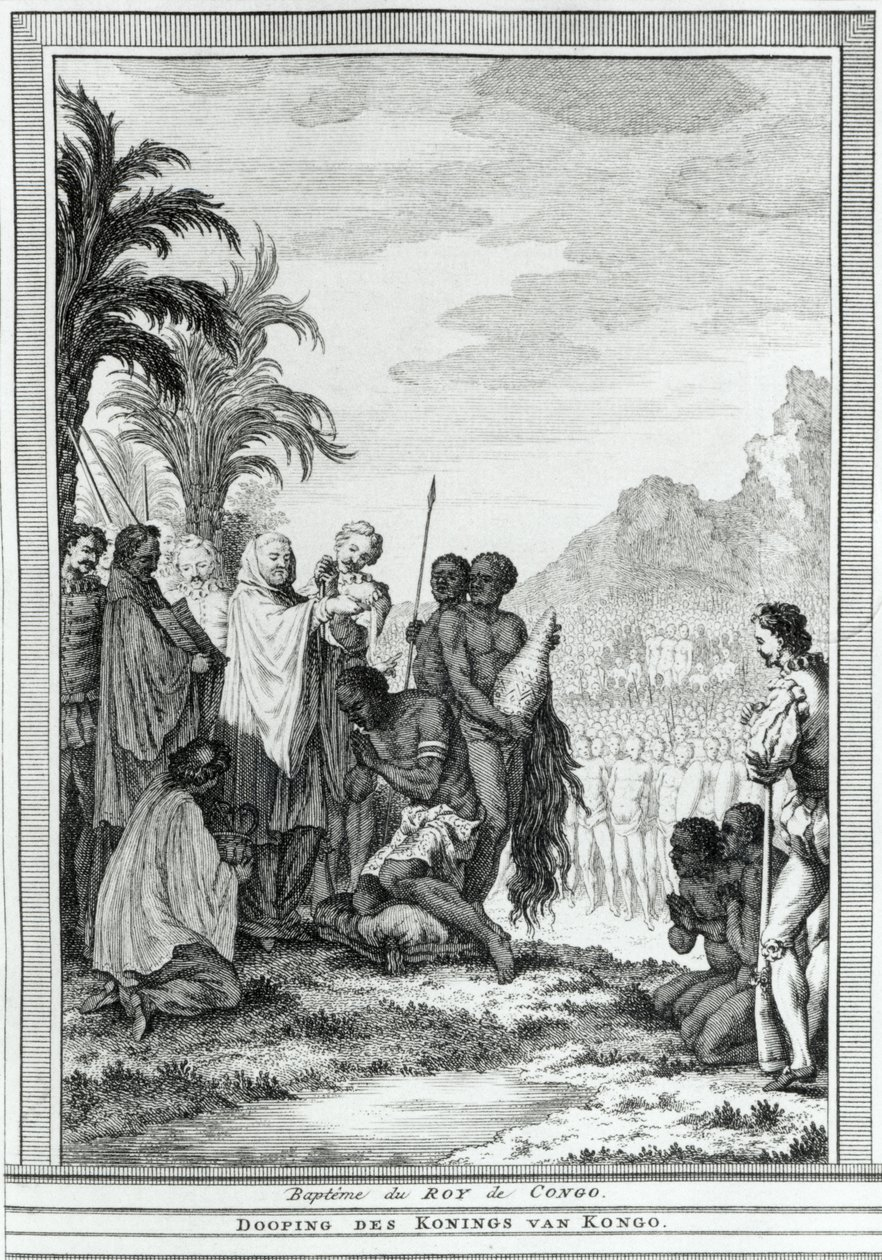
18th-century engraving of the baptism of João I ("Nzinga a Nkuwu")

In 1483, the Portuguese explorer Diogo Cão reached the coast of the Kongo Kingdom. Cão left some of his men in Kongo and took Kongo nobles to Portugal. He returned to Kongo with the Kongo nobles in 1485; such commissioning, hiring, or even kidnapping of local Africans to use as local ambassadors, especially for newly contacted areas, was by then an already established practice. At that point the ruling king, Nzinga a Nkuwu, decided he would become Christian and sent another, large mission headed by Kala ka Mfusu, the noble who had earlier gone to Portugal as a hostage. They remained in Europe for nearly four years, studying Christianity and learning reading and writing. The mission returned with Cão, who was accompanied with Catholic priests and soldiers in 1491, baptising Nzinga a Nkuwu, who took the Christian name of João I in honour of Portugal's king at the time, João II. Moreover, the king's principal nobles. starting with the ruler of Soyo, the coastal province, were baptised as well.

However, one of the key obstacles in this conversion was the issue of monogamy. While Catholic writers saw Kongolese resistance to this as grounded in lust and sin, the reasons for resistance were in fact, fundamental to Kongolese social structure. Ann Hilton notes that polygamy was deeply embedded in the system of state formation through marriage and household alliances of the kanda. Thus, tampering with polygamy threatened to de-stabilise the social and political world of Kongo. Therefore, upon the death of João I in 1506, a conflict arose between conservatives who preferred the Kongolese faith and the Catholic bloc led by Afonso I. After Afonso's triumph against his half brother, Mpanzu a Kitima, in 1509, Catholicism became the state cult for the ruling Mwissikongo.

According to Afonso's own account, he was able to win the battle thanks to the intervention of a heavenly vision of the cross of Saint James and the Virgin Mary. Inspired by these events, he subsequently designed a coat of arms for Kongo that was used by all following kings on official documents, royal paraphernalia and the like until 1860.

=== Reign of Afonso I ===
Banner of King Afonso I

Upon his ascension as king in 1509, Afonso I worked to create a viable version of the Catholic Church in Kongo, providing for its income from royal assets and taxation that provided salaries for its workers. With advisers from Portugal such as Rui d'Aguiar, the Portuguese royal chaplain sent to assist Kongo's religious development, Afonso created a syncretic version of Christianity that would remain a part of its culture for the rest of the kingdom's independent existence. King Afonso himself studied hard at this task. Rui d'Aguiar once said Afonso I knew more of the church's tenets than he did.

The Kongo church was always short of ordained clergy and made up for it by the employment of a strong laity. Kongolese school teachers or mestres (KiKongo alongi a aleke) were the anchor of this system. Recruited from the nobility and trained in the kingdom's schools, they provided religious instruction and services to others building upon Kongo's growing Christian population. At the same time, they permitted the growth of syncretic forms of Christianity which incorporated older religious ideas with Christian ones. Examples of this are the introduction of KiKongo words to translate Christian concepts. The KiKongo words ukisi (an abstract word meaning charm, which used to mean "holy") and nkanda (meaning book) were merged so that the Christian Bible became known as the nkanda ukisi (holy book). The church became known as the nzo a ukisi (holy house). Some European clergy denounced these mixed traditions without being able to root them out.

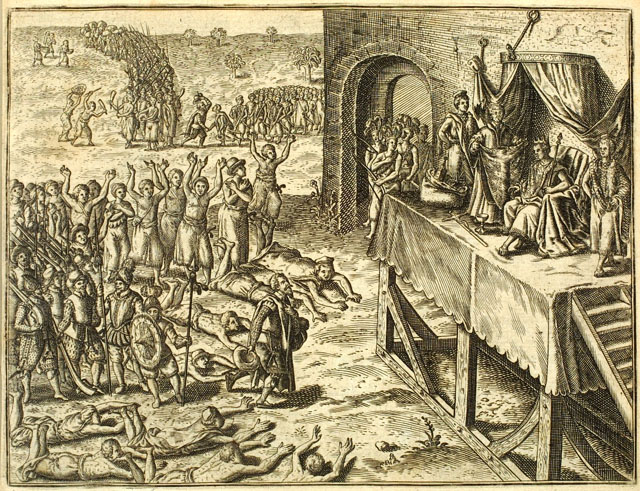
An image depicting Portuguese encounter with Kongo royal family

Part of the establishment of this church was the creation of a strong priesthood and to this end, Afonso's son Henrique was sent to Europe to be educated. Henrique became an ordained priest and in 1518 was named as titular bishop of Utica (a North African diocese recently reclaimed from the Muslims). He returned to Kongo in the early 1520s to run Kongo's new church. He died in 1531.

==== Expansion of the slave trade ====
Slavery had existed since the Kingdom of Kongo's founding, as during its early wars of expansion the nascent kingdom had taken many captives. Kongo's tradition of forcibly transferring peoples captured in wars to the royal capital was key to the power of the Kongolese king, and it was the same mechanism of enslavement and transfer of population that made Kongo an efficient exporter of slaves. Kongolese laws and cultural traditions protected freeborn Kongolese from enslavement, and so most of the enslaved population were war captives. Convicted Kongolese criminals could also be forced into slavery, and were initially protected from sale outside the kingdom. The export of female slaves was also prohibited. Afonso's early letters show evidence of domestic slave markets.

As relations between Kongo and Portugal grew in the early 16th century, trade between the kingdoms also increased. Most of the trade was in palm cloth, copper, and ivory, with increasing numbers of slaves. Although initially Kongo exported few slaves, following the development of a successful sugar-growing colony on the Portuguese island of São Tomé, Kongo became a major source of slaves for the island's traders and plantations. The Cantino Atlas of 1502 mentioned Kongo as a source of slaves for the São Tomé colony, and said they were few. Correspondence by Afonso also show the purchase and sale of slaves within the country and his accounts on capturing slaves in war which were given and sold to Portuguese merchants.

Afonso continued to expand the kingdom of Kongo into the 1540s, expanding its borders to the south and east. The expansion of Kongo's population, coupled with his earlier religious reforms, allowed Afonso to centralise power in his capital and increase the power of the monarchy. He also established a royal monopoly on some trade. To govern the growing slave trade, Afonso and several Portuguese kings claimed a joint monopoly on the external slave trade.

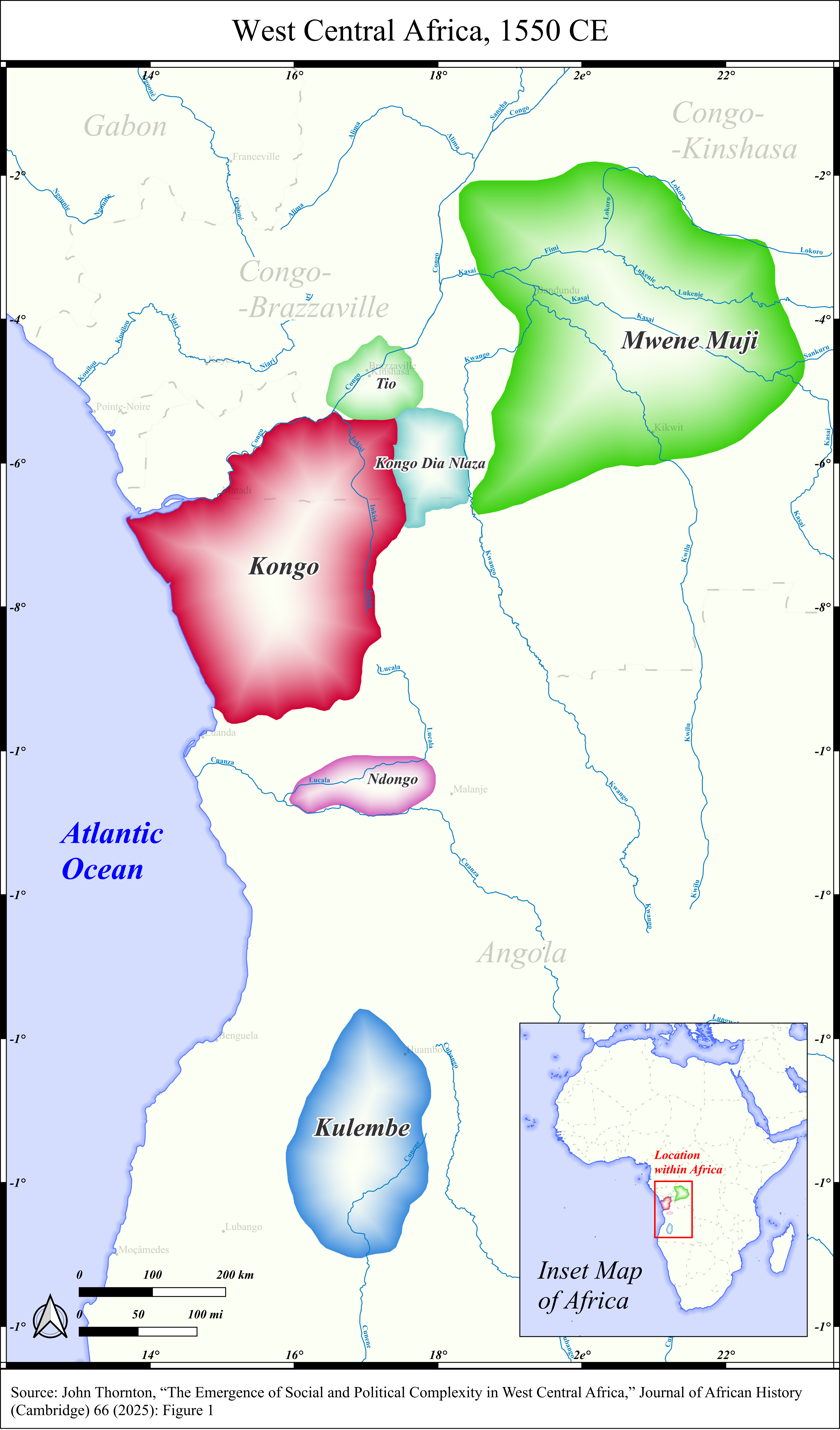
Major states of the western Congo Basin, c. 1550

However, as the slave trade grew in size, it came to gradually erode royal power in Kongo. Portuguese traders based in São Tomé began violating the royal monopoly on the slave trade, trading instead with other African states in the region. Portuguese merchants also began to trade goods with powerful Kongolese nobles, depriving the monarchy of tax revenue, while Portuguese priests and merchants living in the Kongo became increasingly politically active. New markets for slaves such as Mpanzalumbu (a rebel Kongolese province conquered by Afonso in 1526) and the Mbundu Kingdom of Ndongo also rivalled the Kongolese monopoly on the slave trade.

In 1526, Afonso complained in correspondence to King João III of Portugal about the merchants' violation of his end of the monopoly, claiming that Portuguese officials had not regulated them sufficiently, and threatened to stop the slave trade altogether. Afonso noted that some unscrupulous nobles were resorting to kidnapping their fellow Kongolese to supply the slave trade. To reform the trade, Afonso reiterated the need to follow Kongolese law and not enslave Kongolese freemen, while also establishing a board to better regulate the slave trade. Afonso also established a special committee to determine the legality of the enslavement of those who were being sold.

However, the kings of Portugal eventually determined the best way to deal with the trade through the Kwanza to Ndongo was to establish their own base there. In 1560, again responding to a request from Angola, the Portuguese crown sent Paulo Dias de Novais as ambassador to Ndongo with the idea of settling relations with the country. Ngola Kiluanji was not interested in this mission, however, as it offered only baptism and diplomatic relations, while he hoped for military support. In 1575, Portugal would follow with a mission of conquest, also under Paulo Dias de Novais, this time to conquer the country and monopolise its slave trade.

=== Royal rivalries ===
King Diogo I skilfully replaced or outmanoeuvred his entrenched competitors after he was crowned in 1545. He faced a major conspiracy led by Pedro I, who had taken refuge in a church, and whom Diogo in respect of the Church's rule of asylum allowed to remain in the church. However, Diogo did conduct an inquiry into the plot, the text of which was sent to Portugal in 1552 which shows the way in which plotters hoped to overthrow the king by enticing his supporters to abandon him.

=== Kongo under the House of Kwilu ===
Álvaro I was not directly descended from a previous king, and so his seizure of the throne in the midst of the crisis caused by the 1568 Jaga invasion marked the beginning of a new royal line, the House of Kwilu. There were certainly factions that opposed him, though it is not known specifically who they were.

Álvaro's rule began in war with the Jagas, who may have been external invaders or rebels from within the country, either peasants or nobles from rival factions fighting against the profound changes and instability introduced by European trading and slaving. As the Jagas drove him from the capital to refuge on an island in the Congo River, Álvaro appealed to Portugal for aid, and was sent an expedition under Francisco de Gouveia Sottomaior, governor of São Tomé. As a part of the same process, Álvaro agreed to allow the Portuguese to establish a colony in Luanda, the source of the nzimbu shell money used by the kingdom. In addition, Kongo provided the Portuguese with support in their war against the Kingdom of Ndongo in 1579. Ndongo was located inland, east of Luanda and although claimed in Kongo's royal titles as early as 1535, was probably never under a firm Kongo administration.

Álvaro also worked hard to westernise Kongo, gradually introducing European style titles for his nobles, so that the Mwene Nsundi became the Duke of Nsundi; the Mwene Mbamba became the Duke of Mbamba. The Mwene Mpemba became Marquis of Mpemba, and the Mwene Soyo became Count of Soyo. In 1607, he and his son Álvaro II ("Nimi a Nkanga", crowned in 1587) bestowed orders of chivalry called the Order of Christ. The capital was also renamed São Salvador or "Holy Savior" in Portuguese during this period. In 1596, Álvaro's emissaries to Rome persuaded the Pope to recognise São Salvador as the cathedral of a new diocese which would include Kongo and the Portuguese territory in Angola. However, the king of Portugal won the right to nominate the bishops to this see, which became a source of tension between the two countries.

Portuguese bishops in the kingdom were often favourable to European interests in a time when relations between Kongo and Angola were tense. They refused to appoint priests, forcing Kongo to rely more and more heavily on the laity. Documents of the time show that lay teachers (called mestres in Portuguese-language documents) were paid salaries and appointed by the crown, and at times Kongo kings withheld income and services to the bishops and their supporters (a tactic called "country excommunication"). Controlling revenue was vital for Kongo's kings since even Jesuit missionaries were paid salaries from the royal exchequer.

At the same time as this ecclesiastical problem developed, the governors of Angola began to extend their campaigns into areas that Kongo regarded as firmly under its sovereignty. This included the region around Nambu a Ngongo, which Governor João Furtado attacked in the mid-1590s during the battle of Mbumbi. Other campaigns in the vicinity led to denunciations by the rulers of Kongo against these violations of their sovereignty.

==== Factionalism ====
Álvaro I and his successor, Álvaro II, also faced problems with factional rivals from families that had been displaced from succession. In order to raise support against some enemies, they had to make concessions to others. One of the most important of these concessions was allowing Manuel, the Count of Soyo, to hold office for many years beginning some time before 1591. During this same period, Álvaro II made a similar concession to António da Silva, the Duke of Mbamba. António da Silva was strong enough to decide the succession of the kingdom, selecting Bernardo II in 1614, then putting him aside in favour of Álvaro III in 1615. It was only with difficulty that Álvaro III was able to put his own choice in as Duke of Mbamba when António da Silva died in 1620 instead of having the province fall into the hands of the duke's son. At the same time, however, Álvaro III created another powerful and semi-independent nobleman in Manuel Jordão, who held Nsundi for him.

By the mid-1600s, the wars of expansion came to an end, stopping the supply of foreign captives. Thus, the demand for slaves could no longer be met. This caused the kingdom to begin exporting freeborn Kongos. Any Kongo convicted of crimes such as theft, rebellion, slander, treason, fornication, and witchcraft was condemned to lifelong slavery, along with their family. Thus, they could be sold to Europeans. If several villagers were found guilty of a crime, the whole village could be enslaved. If a governor misbehaved, their province could be raided by the central government, with some of its inhabitants condemned to slavery. By 1645, a tax existed requiring each household to pay in the form of slaves, at the rate of one slave per year. This was used to pay nobles and elite persons working for the king.

=== Kongo under the House of Nsundi ===
Tensions between Portugal and Kongo increased further as the governors of Portuguese Angola became more aggressive. Luis Mendes de Vasconcelos, who arrived as governor in 1617, used mercenary African groups called Imbangala to make a devastating war on Ndongo, and then to raid and pillage some southern Kongo provinces. He was particularly interested in the province of Kasanze, a marshy region that lay just north of Luanda. Many slaves being deported through Luanda fled into this region and were often granted sanctuary, and for this reason, Mendes de Vasconcelos decided that a determined action was needed to stop it. The next governor of Angola, João Correia de Sousa, used the Imbangala to launch a full-scale invasion of southern Kongo in 1622, following the death of Álvaro III. Correia de Sousa claimed he had the right to choose the king of Kongo. He was also upset that the Kongolese electors chose Pedro II, a former Duke of Mbamba. Pedro II was originally from the duchy of Nsundi, hence the name of the royal house he created, the House of Nsundi. Correia de Sousa also contended that Pedro II had sheltered runaway slaves from Angola during the latter's governorship of Mbamba and therefore, had these captives sent to Brazil as slaves.

==== First Kongo-Portuguese War ====
The First Kongo-Portuguese War began in 1622, initially because of a Portuguese campaign against the Kasanze Kingdom, which was conducted ruthlessly. From there, the army moved to Nambu a Ngongo, whose ruler, Pedro Afonso, was held to be sheltering runaway slaves as well. Although Pedro Afonso, facing an overwhelming army of over 20,000, agreed to return some runaways, the army attacked his country and killed him.

Following its success in Nambu a Ngongo, the Portuguese army advanced into Mbamba in November. The Portuguese forces scored a victory at the Battle of Mbumbi. There they faced a quickly gathered local force led by the new Duke of Mbamba, and reinforced by forces from Mpemba led by its marquis. Both the Duke of Mbamba and the Marquis of Mpemba were killed in the battle. According to Esikongo accounts, they were eaten by the Imbangala allies of the Portuguese. However, Pedro II, the newly crowned king of Kongo, brought the main army, including troops from Soyo, down into Mbamba and decisively defeated the Portuguese, driving them from the country at a battle waged somewhere near Mbanda Kasi in January 1623. Portuguese residents of Kongo, frightened by the consequences for their business of the invasion, wrote a hostile letter to Correia de Sousa, denouncing his invasion.

Following the defeat of the Portuguese at Mbanda Kasi, Pedro II declared Angola an official enemy. The king then wrote letters denouncing Correia de Sousa to the King of Spain and the Pope. Meanwhile, anti-Portuguese riots broke out all over the kingdom and threatened its long-established merchant community. Portuguese throughout the country were humiliatingly disarmed and even forced to give up their clothes. Pedro, anxious not to alienate the Portuguese merchant community, and aware that they had generally remained loyal during the war, did as much as he could to preserve their lives and property, leading some of his detractors to call him "king of Portuguese".

As a result of Kongo's victory, the Portuguese merchant community of Luanda revolted against the governor, hoping to preserve their ties with the king. Backed by the Jesuits, who had also just recommenced their mission there, they forced João Correia de Sousa to resign and flee the country. The interim government that followed the departure was led by the bishop of Angola. They were very conciliatory to Kongo and agreed to return over a thousand of the slaves captured by Correia de Sousa, especially the lesser nobles captured at the Battle of Mbumbi.

Regardless of the overtures of the new government in Angola, Pedro II had not forgotten the invasion and planned to remove the Portuguese from the realm altogether. The king sent a letter to the Dutch Estates General proposing a joint military attack on Angola with a Kongo army and a Dutch fleet. He would pay the Dutch with gold, silver, and ivory for their efforts. As planned, a Dutch fleet under the command of the celebrated admiral Piet Hein arrived in Luanda to carry out an attack in 1624. The plan failed to come to fruition as by then Pedro had died and his son Garcia I ("Mvemba a Nkanga") was elected king. King Garcia I was more forgiving of the Portuguese and had been successfully persuaded by their various gestures of conciliation. He was unwilling to press the attack on Angola at that time, contending that as a Catholic, he could not ally with non-Catholics to attack the city.

=== Factionalism and return of the House of Kwilu ===
The end of the first quarter of the 17th century saw a new flare-up in Kongo's political struggle. At the heart of the conflict were two noble houses fighting over the kingship. On one side of the conflict was the House of Kwilu, which counted most of the kings named Álvaro. They were ousted by the opposing House of Nsundi, when Pedro II was placed on the throne by powerful local forces in São Salvador, probably as a compromise when Álvaro III died without an heir old enough to rule.

As the reigning power, the House of Nsundi worked earnestly to place partisans in king-making positions throughout the empire. Either Pedro II or Garcia I managed to secure Soyo in the hands of Count Paulo, who held it and supported the House of Nsundi from about 1625 until 1641. Meanwhile, Manuel Jordão, a partisan of the House of Kwilu, managed to force Garcia I to flee and placed Ambrósio I of the House of Kwilu on the throne.

King Ambrósio either could not or did not remove Paulo from Soyo, though he did eventually remove Jordão. After a rule marked by rumours of war mobilisations and other disruptions, a great riot at the capital resulted in the death of the king by a mob. Ambrosio was replaced with Álvaro IV by the Duke of Mbamba, Daniel da Silva. King Álvaro IV was only eleven at the time and easily manipulated. In 1632, Daniel da Silva marched on the capital in order to "rescue his nephew from his enemies". At the time, he was under the protection of the Count of Soyo, Paulo, Álvaro VI ("Nimi a Lukeni a Nzenze a Ntumba") and his brother Garcia II ("Nkanga a Lukeni"). After a dramatic battle in Soyo, the young king was successfully restored only to be later poisoned by Álvaro V, a Kimpanzu.

=== Kongo under the House of Kinlaza ===
After waging a second war against his cousins, Álvaro VI and Garcia II, Álvaro V was killed, and replaced by Álvaro VI in 1636, initiating the House of Kinlaza's rule over Kongo. Following his death in 1641, Álvaro VI's brother took over, and was crowned Garcia II. The former House of Nsundi was consolidated with their House of Kwilu rivals as the Kimpanzu lineage of the dead Álvaro V.

Garcia II took the throne on the eve of several crises. One of his rivals, Daniel da Silva (who probably received the patronage of the Daniel da Silva who was killed by Garcia II while defending Álvaro IV), managed to secure the County of Soyo and used it as a base against Garcia II for the whole of his reign. As a result, Garcia II was prevented from completely consolidating his authority. Another problem facing King Garcia II was a rebellion in the Dembos region, which also threatened his authority. Lastly, there was the agreement made by Pedro II in 1622, promising Kongo's support to the Dutch in an offensive to oust Portugal from Luanda.

==== Dutch invasion of Luanda, and the Second Portuguese War ====
In 1641, the Dutch invaded Angola and captured Luanda, after an almost bloodless struggle. They immediately sought to renew their alliance with Kongo, which had had a false start in 1624, when Garcia I refused to assist a Dutch attack on Luanda. While relations between São Salvador and Luanda were not warm, the two polities had enjoyed an easy peace, due to the former's internal distractions, and the latter's war against the Kingdom of Matamba. The same year of the Portuguese ouster from Luanda, Kongo entered into a formal agreement with the new government, and agreed to provide military assistance as needed. Garcia II ejected nearly all Portuguese and Luso-African merchants from his kingdom. The colony of Angola was declared an enemy once again, and the Duke of Mbamba was sent with an army to assist the Dutch. The Dutch also provided Kongo with military assistance, in exchange for payment in slaves.

In 1642, the Dutch sent troops to help Garcia II put down an uprising by peoples of the southern district in the Dembos region. The government quickly put down the Nsala rebellion, reaffirming the Kongo-Dutch alliance. King Garcia II paid the Dutch for their services in slaves taken from ranks of Dembos rebels. These slaves were sent to Pernambuco in Brazil, where the Dutch had taken over a portion of the Portuguese sugar-producing region. A Dutch-Kongo force attacked Portuguese bases on the Bengo River in 1643 in retaliation for Portuguese harassment. The Dutch captured Portuguese positions and forced their rivals to withdraw to Dutch forts on the Kwanza River at Muxima and Masangano. Following this victory, the Dutch once again appeared to lose interest in conquering the colony of Angola.

As in their conquest of Pernambuco in Brazil, the Dutch West India Company (WIC) was content to allow the Portuguese to remain inland. The Dutch sought to spare themselves the expense of war, and instead relied on control of shipping to profit from the colony. Thus, to Garcia's chagrin, the Portuguese and Dutch signed a peace treaty in 1643, ending the brief albeit successful war. With the Portuguese out of the way and an end to Dutch pursuit of troops, Garcia II could finally turn his attention to the growing threat posed by the Count of Soyo.

==== Kongo's war with Soyo ====
While Garcia was disappointed that his alliance with the Dutch could not drive out the Portuguese, it did free him to turn his attention to the growing threat posed by the Count of Soyo. The Counts of Soyo were initially strong partisans of the House of Nsundi and its successor, the House of Kinlaza. Count Paulo had assisted in the rise of the Kinlaza to power. However, Paulo died at about the same time as Garcia became king in 1641. A rival count, Daniel da Silva from the House of Kwilu, took control of the county as a partisan of the newly formed Kimpanzu faction. He would claim that Soyo had the right to choose its own ruler, though Garcia never accepted this claim, and spent much of the first part of his reign fighting against it. Garcia did not support da Silva's move, as Soyo's ruler was one of the most important offices in Kongo.

In 1645, Garcia II sent a force against Daniel da Silva under the command of his son, Afonso. The campaign was a failure, due to Kongo's inability to take Soyo's fortified position at Mfinda Ngula. Worse still, Afonso was captured in the battle, forcing Garcia to engage in humiliating negotiations with da Silva to win back his son's freedom. Italian Capuchin missionaries who had just arrived in Soyo, in the aftermath of the battle, assisted in the negotiations. In 1646, Garcia sent a second military force against Soyo, and his forces were again defeated. Because Garcia was so intent on subduing Soyo, he was unable to make a full military effort to assist the Dutch in their war against Portugal.

==== Third Portuguese War ====
The Dutch were convinced that they could avoid committing their forces to any further wars and made peace with Portugal in 1643, while retaining their military presence in their part of Angola. The Portuguese moved aggressively against Queen Nzinga, and when Portuguese reinforcements managed to defeat her at Kavanga in 1646, the Dutch felt obliged to be more aggressive. Queen Nzinga persuaded Garcia II to send forces to assist in another venture against the Portuguese. In 1647, Kongo troops participated in the Battle of Kombi, where they soundly defeated the Portuguese field army, after forcing them to fight defensively. Subsequently, Nzinga's army besieged all the Portuguese in the interior of the colony.

A year later, Portuguese reinforcements from Brazil forced the Dutch to surrender Luanda and withdraw from Angola in 1648. The new Portuguese governor, Salvador de Sá, sought terms with Kongo, demanding the Island of Luanda, the source of Kongo's money supply of nzimbu shells. Although neither Kongo nor Angola ever ratified the treaty, sent to the king in 1649, the Portuguese gained de facto control of the island. The war resulted in the Dutch losing their claims in Central Africa, Nzinga being forced back into Matamba, the Portuguese restored to their coastal position. Kongo lost or gained nothing, other than the indemnity Garcia paid, which ended hostilities between the two rival powers.

==== Battle of Mbwila ====
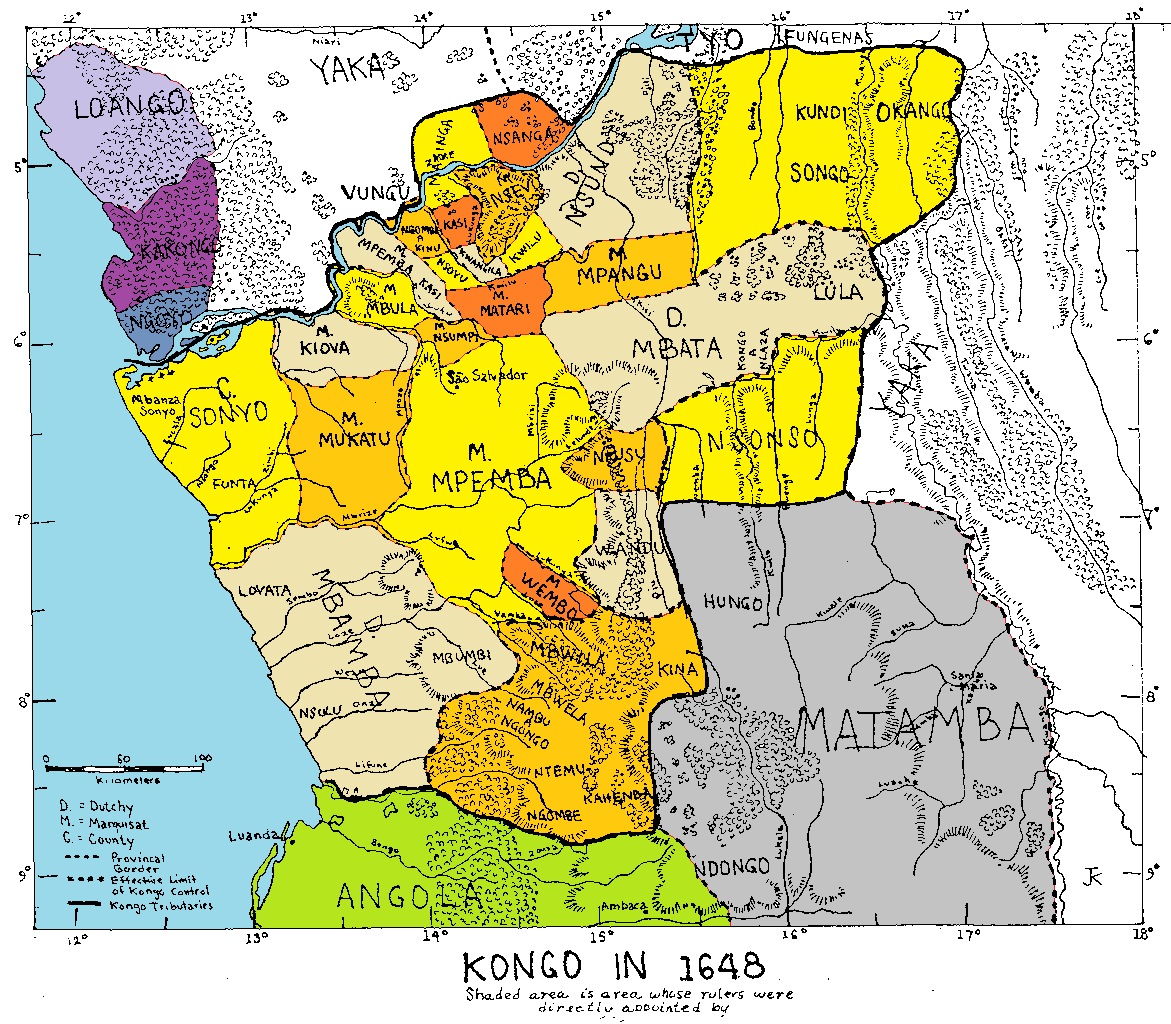
The Kingdom of Kongo in 1648

Portugal began pressing claims over southern vassals of Kongo, especially the country of Mbwila, following Portuguese restoration at Luanda. Mbwila, a nominal vassal of Kongo, had also signed a treaty of vassalage with Portugal in 1619. It divided its loyalty between the Colony of Angola and Kongo in the intervening period. Though the Portuguese often attacked Mbwila, they never brought it under their authority.

Kongo began working towards a Spanish alliance, especially following António I's succession as king in 1661. Although it is not clear what diplomatic activities he engaged in with Spain itself, the Portuguese clearly believed that he hoped to repeat the Dutch invasion, this time with the assistance of Spain. António sent emissaries to the Dembos region and to Matamba and Mbwila, attempting to form a new anti-Portuguese alliance. The Portuguese had been troubled, moreover, by Kongo support of runaway slaves, who flocked to southern Kongo throughout the 1650s. At the same time, the Portuguese were advancing their own agenda for Mbwila, which they claimed as a vassal. In 1665, both sides invaded Mbwila, and their rival armies met each other at Ulanga, in the valley below Mbanza Mbwila, capital of the district.

At the Battle of Mbwila in 1665, the Portuguese forces from Angola had their first victory against the kingdom of Kongo since 1622. They defeated the forces under António I killing him and many of his courtiers as well as the Luso-African Capuchin priest Manuel Roboredo (also known by his cloister name of Francisco de São Salvador), who had attempted to prevent this final war. Many of the survivors of the Kongo army were taken captive and sold as slaves in the Americas. Some were brought to Brazil and others were possibly brought to Spanish America. António's son and heir, Francisco de Menezes Nkanka Makaya, was imprisoned in Luanda by the Portuguese.

=== Kongo Civil War ===
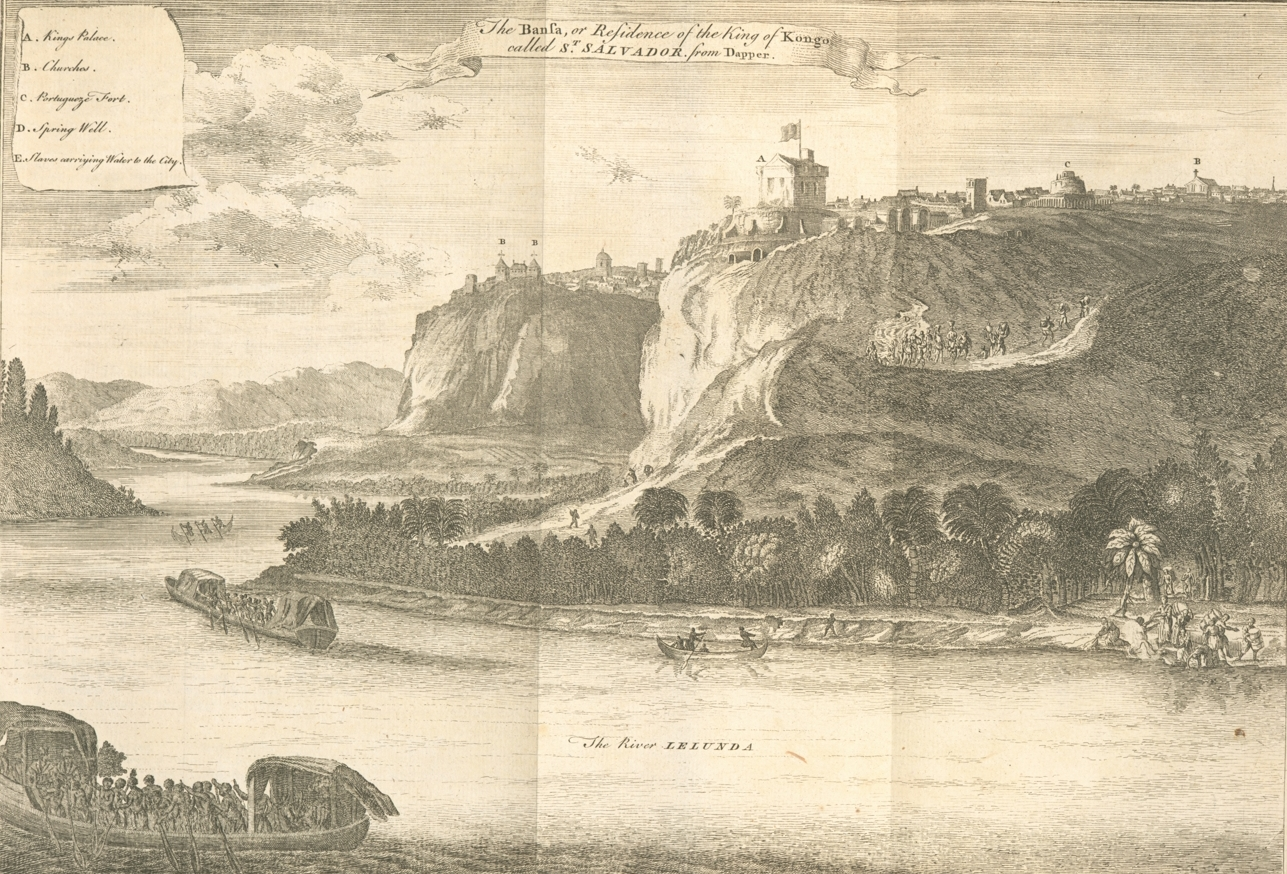
São Salvador after painting by Olfert Dapper, 1668

In the aftermath of the battle of Mbwila, there was no clear succession. The country was divided between rival claimants to the throne, the Kimpanzu and Kinlaza. These two factions, Kimpanzu and Kinlaza, hardened and partitioned the country between them. However, disagreement over the succession caused a 40-year-long civil war between the factions. During this conflict, pretenders would ascend to the throne and then be ousted. This caused a marked increase in BaKongo slaves sold across the Atlantic, the weakening of the Kongo monarchy, and the strengthening of Soyo.

During this chaos, Kongo was being increasingly manipulated by Soyo. In an act of desperation, the central authority in Kongo called on Luanda to attack Soyo in return for various concessions. The Portuguese invaded the county of Soyo in 1670. They met with no more success than Garcia II, being roundly defeated by Soyo's forces at the Battle of Kitombo on 18 October 1670. The kingdom of Kongo was to remain completely independent, though still embroiled in civil war, thanks to the very force (Portuguese colonists) it had fought so long to destroy. This Portuguese defeat was resounding enough to end all Portuguese ambitions in Kongo's sphere of influence, until the end of the nineteenth century.

The battles between the Kimpanzu and Kinlaza continued plunging the kingdom into a chaos not known in centuries. The fighting between the two lineages led to the sack of São Salvador in 1678. The city and hinterland around M'banza-Kongo became depopulated. The population dispersed into the mountain top fortresses of the rival kings. These were the Mountain of Kibangu east of the capital and the fortress of the Águas Rosadas, a line founded in the 1680s from descendants of Kinlaza and Kimpanzu, the region of Mbula, or Lemba, where a line founded by the Kinlaza pretender, Pedro III ruled; and Lovota, a district in southern Soyo that sheltered a Kimpanzu lineage whose head was D Suzanna de Nóbrega. Finally, D Ana Afonso de Leão founded her own centre on the Mbidizi River at Nkondo, and guided her junior kinsmen to reclaim the country, even as she sought to reconcile the hostile factions.

Leaders of rival factions, along with their families and supporters, defeated in battle, were sold as slaves to European slave traders. One route led Kongo slaves north to Loango, whose merchants, known as Vili (Mubires in the period) sold them to British and Dutch merchants, supplying slaves to North America and the Caribbean. Another route led south to Luanda, where they were sold to Portuguese merchants, supplying slaves to Brazil. By the end of the seventeenth century, several long wars and interventions by the now independent Counts of Soyo (who restyled themselves as Grand Princes) had brought an end to Kongo's golden age.

=== Fragmentation ===
As the 17th-century drew to a close several places once part of Kongo became de facto independent. This included areas such as Nsonso.

=== 18th and 19th centuries ===
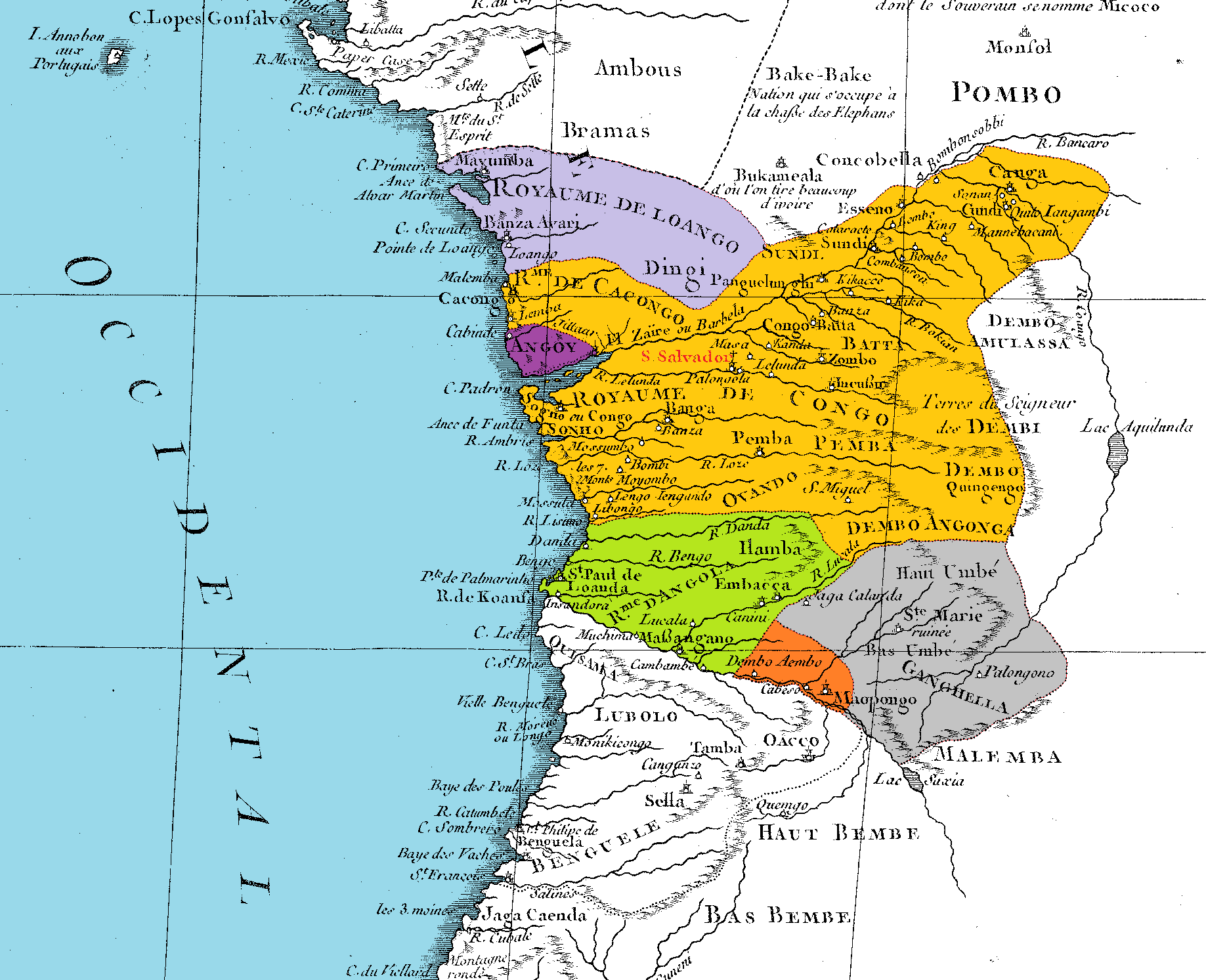
Kongo in 1770

In the eighteenth and nineteenth centuries, Kongo artists began making crucifixes and other religious objects that depicted Jesus as an African. Such objects produced by many workshops over a long period (given their variety) reflect that emerging belief that Kongo was a central part of the Christian world, and fundamental to its history. A story of the eighteenth century was that the partially ruined cathedral of São Salvador, originally constructed for the Jesuits in 1549 and eventually elevated to cathedral status, was actually built overnight by angels. It was called affectionately, Nkulumbimbi.

Manuel II succeeded Pedro IV in 1718. Manuel II ruled over a restored and restive kingdom until his death in 1743. However, Soyo's provincial status in the kingdom, nominal for years, limited Manuel's power. Nsundi on the north had also more or less become independent, although still claiming to be part of the larger kingdom and more or less permanently ruled by a Kimpanzu family. Even within the remaining portions of the kingdom, there were still powerful and violent rivalries. At least one major war took place in the 1730s in the province of Mbamba. Pedro IV's successor, Garcia IV ("Nkanga a Mvandu"), ruled from 1743 to 1752. Pedro IV's restoration required his successor's membership in a branch of the Kinlaza faction resident in Matadi that had sworn loyalty to Pedro IV in 1716. Other Kinlaza branches had developed in the north, at Lemba and Matari, and in the south along the Mbidizi River in lands that had been ruled by D. Ana Afonso de Leão. De Leão's lands came to be called the "Lands of the Queen".

The system of alternating succession broke down in 1764, when Álvaro XI, a Kinlaza, drove out the usurping Kimpanzu king Pedro V (the first to bear this title) and took over the throne. Pedro and his successor in Luvata maintained a separate court at Sembo, and never acknowledged the usurpation. A regent of Pedro's successor claimed the throne in the early 1780s and pressed his claims against a José I, a Kinlaza from the Mbidizi Valley branch of the royal family. José won the showdown, fought at São Salvador in 1781, a massive battle involving 30,000 soldiers on José's side alone. To show his contempt for his defeated rival, José refused to allow the soldiers of the other faction to receive Christian burial. José's power was limited, as he had no sway over the lands controlled by the Kinlaza faction of Lemba and Matari, even though they were technically of the same family, and he did not follow up his victory to extend his authority over the Kimpanzu lands around Luvota. At the same time, the lands around Mount Kibangu, Pedro IV's original base, was controlled—as it had been for the whole eighteenth century—by members of the Água Rosada family, who claimed descent from both the Kimpanzu and Kinlaza.

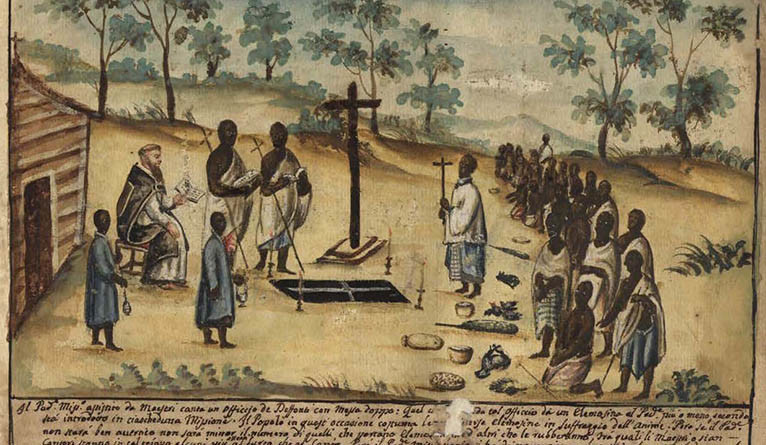
Christian funeral in the Kingdom of Kongo, c. 1750

José ruled until 1785, when he handed power over to his brother Afonso V (1785–87). Afonso's brief reign ended in his sudden death, rumoured to be by poisoning. A confused struggle broke out following Afonso's death. By 1794, the throne ended up in the hands of Henrique I, a man of uncertain factional origin, who arranged for three parties to divide the succession. Garcia V abrogated the arrangement, proclaiming himself king in 1805. He ruled until 1830. André II, who followed Garcia V, appeared to have restored the older rotational claims, as he was from the northern branch of the Kinlaza, whose capital had moved from Matadi to Manga. André ruled until 1842 when Henrique III, from the southern (Mbidizi Valley) branch of the same family, overthrew him. Henrique III developed his power in the same manner as other entrepreneurial nobles, by founding villages of slaves or followers and drawing strength from them.

André, however, did not accept his fate and withdrew with his followers to Mbanza Mputo, a village just beyond the edge of São Salvador, where he and his descendants kept up their claims. King Henrique III, who came to power after overthrowing André II, ruled Kongo from 1842 until his death in 1857. While Aleixo de Água Rosada (brother of king Henrique III) ordered a Dembo chief Nambwa Ngôngo not to pay a new Portuguese tax in 1841. His capture and imprisonment by the Portuguese took place some time after he ordered Nambwa Ngôngo.

Civil wars would reemerge in the 18th and 19th centuries, causing a continuation in the export of BaKongo slaves. In the 18th century, succession disputes between the Kimpanzu and Kinlaza caused continuous conflict between the reigns of José I and Henrique II. Some estimates say that between 1780 and 1790, up to 62,000 Kongo slaves were sold to the Americas as a result of the conflict. In the 19th century, civil war between the two factions reoccurred, causing Henrique III to continue the sale of Kongo slaves across the Atlantic. This violated the Slave Trade Act 1807 imposed by the British, but the demand for slaves from Brazil and Cuba allowed it to continue illegally.

In 1858, a slave ship, called the Wanderer, transported hundreds of enslaved Africans from the Kingdom of Kongo to the United States in a six-week-long journey across the Atlantic. Most of the slaves on board were KiKongo speakers, meaning they would have been from the BaKongo ethnic group. Upon reaching the Jekyll Island in the U.S., only 409 of the 600 slaves had survived the journey. Most of the survivors ended up working in Edgefield. The names of some of the survivors were Cilucangy, Pucka, Gaeta, and Tahro, Zow Uncola, Manchuella, and Mabiola.

=== Rise of entrepreneurial nobles ===
In 1839, the Portuguese government, acting on British pressure, abolished the slave trade south of the equator, which had so damaged Central Africa. Human trafficking continued until well into the 1920s, first as an illegal slave trade, then as contract labour. A commodity trade replaced the slave trade, at first focused on ivory and wax, and gradually grew to include peanuts and rubber. This trade revolutionised the economies and eventually the politics of the whole of Central Africa. In place of the slave trade, largely under the control of state authorities, thousands, and eventually hundreds of thousands, of commoners began carrying goods from inland to coastal ports. These people managed to share in the wealth of the new trade, and as a result, commercially connected people constructed new villages and challenged the authorities.

During this period, as the slave trade ended, long-distance trade became more prominent, and entrepreneurial nobles became more stable founding markets and protecting trade. They founded new, makanda, nominally clans descended from common ancestors that were as much trading associations as family units. These clans founded strings of villages connected by fictional kinship along the trade routes, from Boma or the coast of Soyo to São Salvador and then on into the interior. A new oral tradition about the founder of the kingdom, often held to be Afonso I, described the kingdom as originating when the king caused the clans to disperse in all directions. The histories of these clans, typically describing the travels of their founder and his followers from an origin point to their final villages, replaced the history of the kingdom itself in many areas.

Despite violent rivalries and the fracturing of the kingdom, it continued to exist independently well into the 19th century. Álvaro XIII ("Ndongo"), a Kimpanzu, claimed the throne on behalf of the Kinlaza faction of Matari, ignoring the existence of André's group at Mbanza Puto, calling himself Álvaro XIII; while Pedro V ("Lelo") claimed the throne on behalf of the Mbidizi Valley faction of the Kinlaza, from a base at Bembe. Pedro ultimately won a long military struggle thanks to soliciting Portuguese aid, and with their help his soldiers defeated Álvaro in 1859. Like André II, Álvaro XIII did not accept defeat and established his own base at Nkunga, not far from São Salvador. The Portuguese support which had put Pedro Lelo on the throne had a price, for when he was crowned Pedro V (he was actually the second king named Pedro V; the first one ruled in the late 1770s) he had also sworn a treaty of vassalage to Portugal. Portugal thus gained nominal authority over Kongo when Pedro gained control of it in 1859, and even constructed a fort in São Salvador to house a garrison. In the same year (1859), Prince Nicolas protested the vassalage of Kongo by publishing a letter in the newspaper Jornal do Commércio in Lisbon, on 1 December.

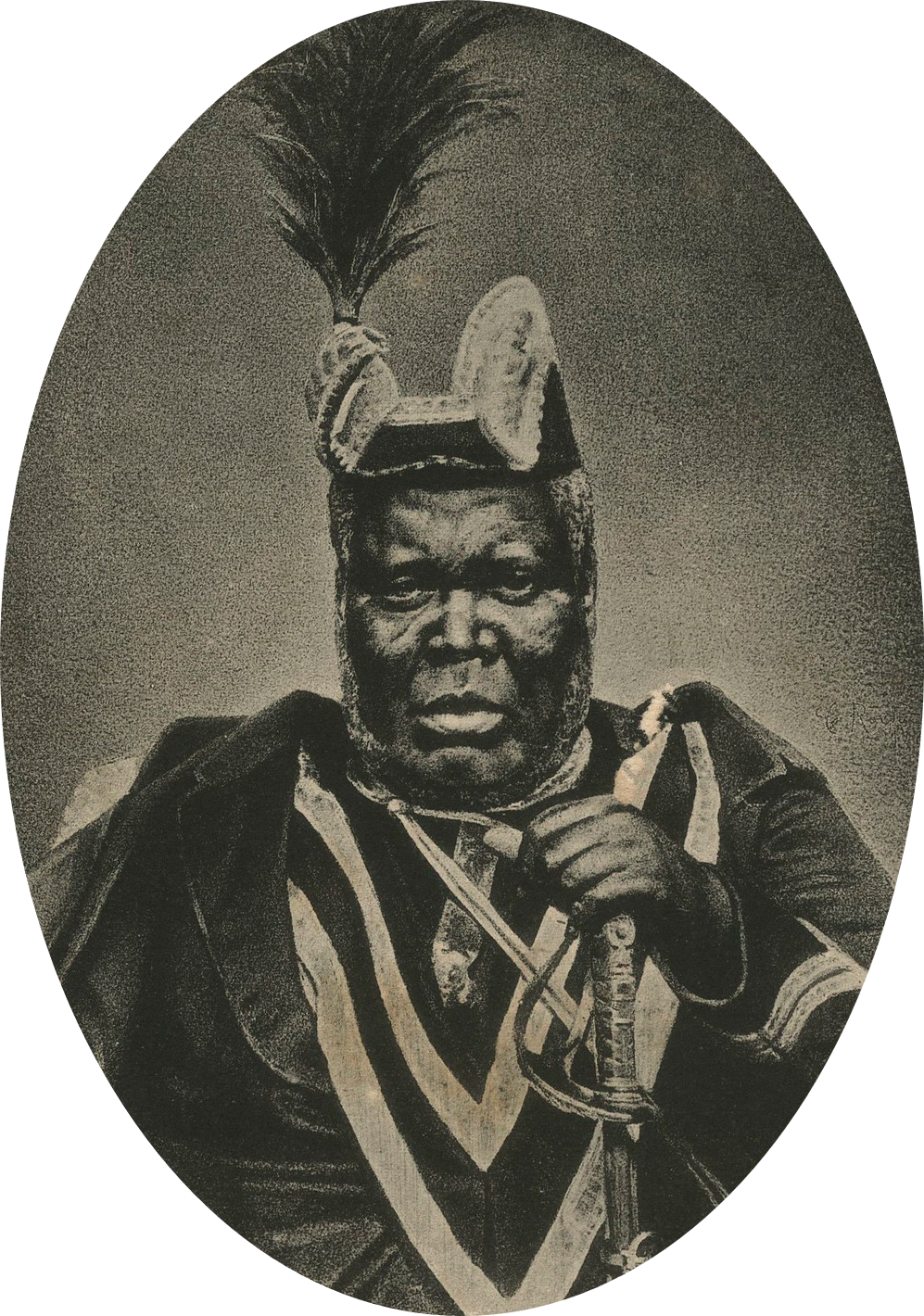
Pedro V, under whom Kongo became a Portuguese vassal. Photo taken in 1885.

In 1866, citing excessive costs, the Portuguese government withdrew its garrison. Pedro was able to continue reigning over Kongo, although he faced increasing rivalry from clan-based trading magnates who drained his authority from much of the country. The most dangerous of these was Garcia Mbwaka Matu of the town of Makuta. This town had been founded by a man named Kuvo, one of the entrepreneurial nobles, his successors including Garcia made a great deal of controlling markets in the new trading regime. This was a great challenge in the 1870s, and after Garcia's death in 1880, Makuta became less problematic.

== Military structure ==
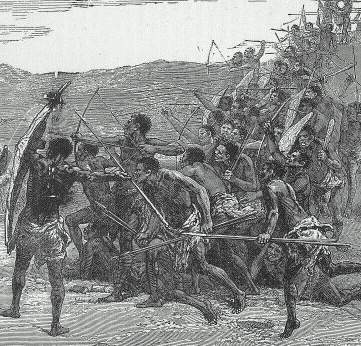
Congo bowmen. The bulk of Kongo's infantry forces, consisted of archers equipped and dressed in a similar fashion to these encountered by the David Livingstone expedition.

The kingdom's army consisted of a mass levy of archers, drawn from the general male population, and a smaller corps of heavy infantry, who fought with swords and carried shields for protection. Portuguese documents typically referred to heavy infantry, considered nobles, as fidalgos in documents. The bearing of a shield was also important, as Portuguese documents usually called the heavy infantry as adargueiros (shield bearers). The shields of the heavy infantry extended from the knees unto the neck of the soldier; this force lacked armour. Most shield bearers bore a "scimitar-shaped longsword" as described by military historian Wayne Lee. Shield bearers were limited by number and approximately 1000 were deployed in most Kongo armies. Some archers, especially those in eastern Kongo, used poison arrows. There is weak evidence to suggest revenue assignments paid and supported them. A large number, perhaps as many as 20,000, stayed in the capital. Smaller contingents lived in the major provinces under the command of provincial rulers. Kongo imported European arms such as swords into the military. In 1583, soldiers of the Mbamba province were armed with longswords similar to that of the Slavonians. Portuguese emissary Duarte Lopez believed this sword "could cut a slave in two."

After 1600, civil war became far more common than inter-state warfare. The government instituted a draft for the entire population during wartime, with a limited number actually serving. Many who did not carry arms instead carried baggage and supplies. Thousands of women supported armies on the move. Administrators expected soldiers to have two weeks' worth of food upon reporting for campaign duty. Logistical difficulties probably limited both the size of armies and their capacity to operate for extended periods. Some Portuguese sources suggested that the king of Kongo fielded armies as large as 70,000 soldiers for a 1665 Battle of Mbwila; it is unlikely that armies larger than 20–30,000 troops could be raised for military campaigns.

Troops were mobilised and reviewed on Saint James' Day, 25 July, when taxes were also collected. Subjects celebrated this day in honour of Saint James and Afonso I, whose miraculous victory over his brother in 1509 was the principal significance of the holiday in the Kongo.

When the Portuguese arrived in Kongo they were immediately added as a mercenary force, probably under their own commander, and used special-purpose weapons, like crossbows and muskets, to add force to the normal Kongo order of battle. Their initial impact was muted; Afonso complained in a letter of 1514 that they had not been very effective in a war he waged against Munza, a Mbundu rebel, the year before. By the 1580s, however, a musketeer corps, which was locally raised from resident Portuguese and their Kongo-mestiço (mixed race) offspring, was a regular part of the main Kongo army in the capital. Provincial armies had some musketeers; for example, they served against the Portuguese invading army in 1622. Three hundred and sixty musketeers served in the Kongo army against the Portuguese at the Battle of Mbwila. Kongolese forces became accustomed to firearms in the 18th century. Primary sources about the battle between regent of King Pedro V and José I in 1781 indicated that José's 30,000 soldiers were armed with "musket and ball." Artillery was used to an extent in the 18th century. According to the historian John Thornton, a Kongolese unit that faced Portuguese forces in 1790 sometimes employed artillery.

In 1509, Afonso I built holes containing an iron each in defence of M'banza-Kongo where they were dug to fortify and surround the city. Its main purpose was to attract the opponent's forces to the central public square of the city where most of the army was assembled. Rival and brother of Afonso I ("Mpanzu a Kitima"), succumbed to this anti-personnel trap during a campaign against Afonso. Sources from the early 16th century document about Central African naval vessels carved from a single log which could carry 150 people. In the 16th century, Kongo was recorded to be able to deploy 800 of such naval vessels. In 1525, one of such boats cooperated with a Portuguese vessel to capture a French ship off the coast of Soyo. The Kongolese vessel played the role of capturing and attacking the shore party from a longboat.

=== Other battles ===
- Battle of Mbanda Kasi (or Mbandi Kasi)
- Battle of Mbidizi River
- Battle of Kitombo

== Political structure ==
The vata village, referred to as libata in Kongo documents and by the Portuguese in the sixteenth century, served as Kongo's basic social unit after the family. Nkuluntu, or mocolunto to the Portuguese, chiefs headed the villages. The one to two hundred citizens per village migrated about every ten years to accommodate soil exhaustion. Communal land-ownership and collective farms produced harvests divided by families according to the number of people per household. The nkuluntu received special premium from the harvest before the division.

Villages were grouped in wene, small states, led by awene (plural of mwene) or mani to the Portuguese. Awene lived in mbanza, larger villages or small towns of somewhere between 1,000 and 5,000 citizens. Higher nobility typically chose these leaders. The king also appointed lower-level officials to serve, typically for three-year terms, by assisting him in patronage.

Various provinces made up Kongo's higher administrative divisions, with some of the larger and more complex states, such as Mbamba, divided into varying numbers of sub-provinces, which the administration further subdivided. The king appointed the Mwene Mbamba, the Duke of Mbamba after the 1590s. The king technically had the power to dismiss the Mwene Mbamba; the complex political situation limited the king's exercise of his power. When the administration gave out European-style titles, large districts like Mbamba and Nsundi typically became Duchies. The administration made smaller ones, such as Mpemba, Mpangu, or a host of territories north of the capital), Marquisates. Soyo, a complex province on the coast, became a "County," as did Nkusu, a smaller and less complex state east of the capital.

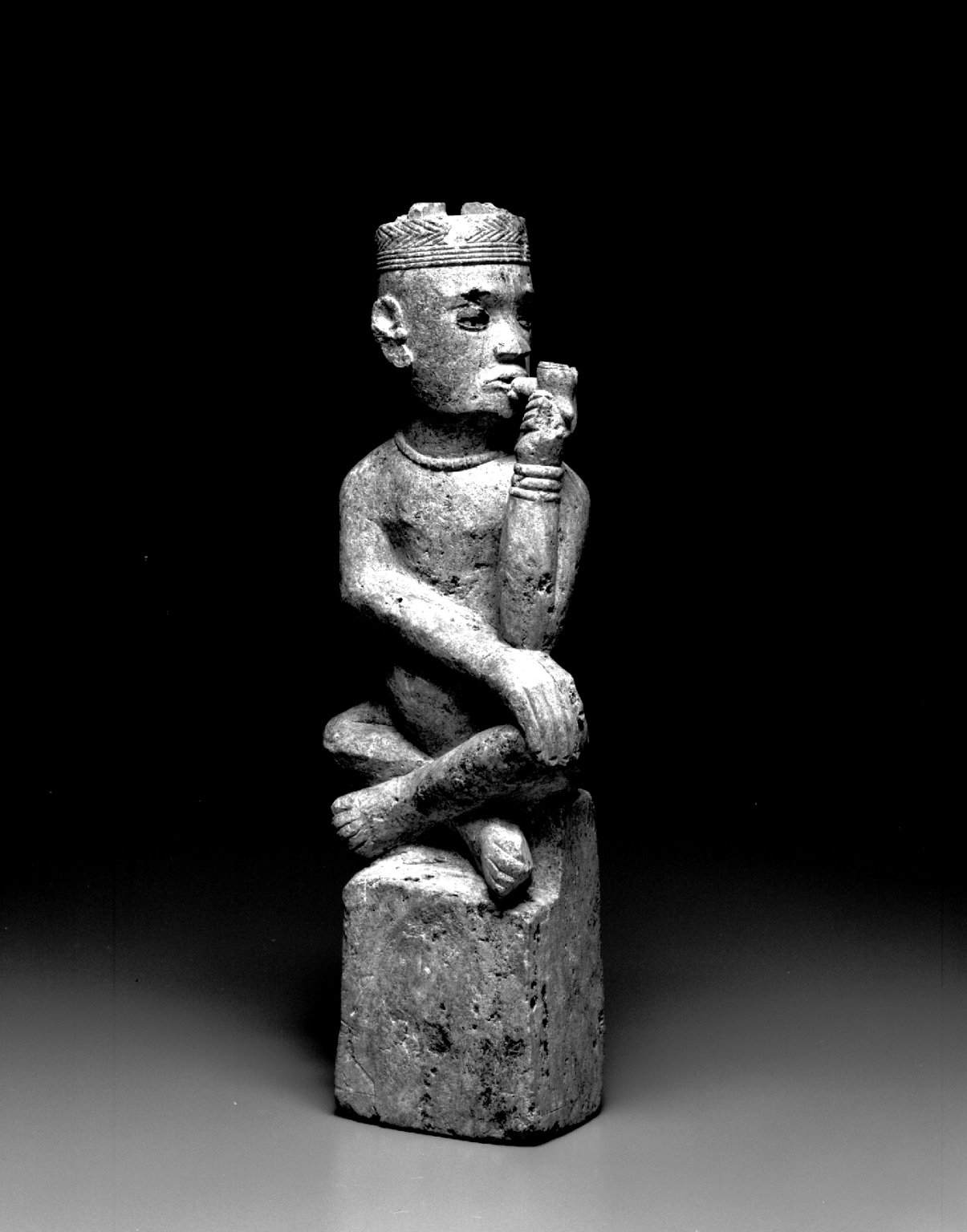
Kongo (Boma subgroup). 19th century Grave Marker (Tumba). The Kongo people placed stone figures called tumba on the graves of powerful people. His cap (mpu) with four leopard's teeth, the beaded necklace, and the bracelet (nlunga) identify him as a chief. The term tumba comes from the old Portuguese word for "tomb"—this genre may have been inspired by grave monuments for European merchants and missionaries in Kongo cemeteries. Brooklyn Museum

Hereditary families controlled a few provinces, most notably the Duchy of Mbata and the County of Nkusu, through their positions as officers appointed by the king. In the case of Mbata, the kingdom's origin as an alliance produced this power, exercised by the Nsaku Lau, the ruler of the Mbata Kingdom. In the seventeenth century, political manoeuvring also caused some provinces, notably Soyo, and occasionally Mbamba, to be held for very long terms by the same person. Provincial governments still paid income to the crown and their rulers reported to the capital to give account.

The kingdom of Kongo was made up of a large number of provinces. Various sources list from six to fifteen as the principal ones. Duarte Lopes' description, based on his experience there in the late sixteenth century, identified six provinces as the most important. These were Nsundi in the northeast, Mpangu in the centre, Mbata in the southeast, Soyo in the southwest, and two southern provinces of Mbamba and Mpemba.

The king of Kongo also held several kingdoms in at least nominal vassalage. These included the kingdoms of Kakongo, Ngoyo, and Vungu to the north of Kongo. The royal titles, first elaborated by Afonso in 1512, styled the ruler as "King of Kongo and Lord of the Mbundus" and later titles listed a number of other counties over which he also ruled as "king". The Mbundu kingdoms included Ndongo (sometimes erroneously mentioned as "Angola"), Kisama, and Matamba. All of these kingdoms were south of Kongo and much farther from the king's cultural influence than the northern kingdoms. Still later eastern kingdoms such as Kongo dia Nlaza were named in the ruler's titles as well.

=== Royal Council ===
The kingdom of Kongo was governed in concert by the Mwene Kongo and the royal council known as the ne mbanda-mbanda, roughly translates as "the top of the top". It was composed of twelve members divided into three groups. One group were bureaucrats, another who were electors and a last of matrons. Senior officials chose the Mwene Kongo or king who served for life following their choice. Electors varied over time, and there was probably never a completely fixed list; rather, senior officials, who exercised power did so. Many kings tried to choose their successor, not always successfully. One of the central problems of Kongo history was the succession of power, and as a result, the country was disturbed by many rebellions and revolts.

==== Bureaucratic posts ====
These four, non-electing posts, were composed of the Mwene Lumbo (lord of the palace/major-domo), Mfila Ntu (most trusted councillor/prime minister), Mwene Vangu-Vangu (lord of deeds or actions/high judge particularly in adultery cases), and Mwene Bampa (treasurer). These four are all appointed by the king and have a great influence on the day-to-day operations of the court.

==== Electors ====
Another four councillors worked to elect the king as well as man important posts. The electors are composed of the Mwene Vunda (lord of Vunda, a small territory north of the capital with mostly religious obligations who leads the electors,) the Mwene Mbata (lord of Mbata province directly east of the capital and run by the Nsaka Lau kanda, which provides the king's Great Wife), Mwene Soyo (lord of Soyo province west of the capital and historically the wealthiest province due to it being the only port and having access to salt), and a fourth elector, likely the Mwene Mbamba (lord of Mbamba province south of the capital and captain-general of the armies).

==== Matrons ====
The council contained four women with great influence on the council. They were led by the Mwene Nzimba Mpungu, a queen-mother, usually being the king's paternal aunt. The next most powerful woman was the Mwene Mbanda, the king's Great Wife, chosen from the Nsaku Lau kanda. The other two posts were given to the next most important women in the kingdom being widowed queens dowager or the matriarchs of former ruling kandas.

== Economic structure ==
=== Currency ===
The universal currency in Kongo and the surrounding region of Central Africa was the shell of Olivella nana, a sea snail known locally as nzimbu. One hundred nzimbu could purchase a hen, 300 a garden hoe, and 2,000 a goat. Slaves, which were always a part of Kongo's economy, were also bought in nzimbu. A female slave could be purchased (or sold) for 20,000 nzimbu and a male slave for 30,000. The slave trade had increased in volume after contact with Portugal.

Nzimbu shells were collected from the island of Luanda and kept as a royal monopoly. The smaller shells were filtered out so that only the large shells entered the marketplace as currency. Kongo would not trade for gold or silver, and nzimbu shells, often put in pots in special increments, could buy anything. Kongo's "money pots" held increments of 40, 100, 250, 400, and 500. For especially large purchases, there were standardised units such as a funda (1,000 big shells), lufuku (10,000 big shells) and a kofo (20,000 big shells).

The Kongo administration regarded their land as renda, revenue assignments. The Kongo government exacted a monetary head tax for each villager, which may well have been paid in kind as well, forming the basis for the kingdom's finances. The king granted titles and income, based on this head tax. Holders reported annually to the court of their superior for evaluation and renewal.

Provincial governors paid a portion of the tax returns from their provinces to the king. Dutch visitors to Kongo in the 1640s reported this income as twenty million nzimbu shells. In addition, the crown collected its own special taxes and levies, including tolls on the substantial trade that passed through the kingdom, especially the lucrative cloth trade between the great cloth-producing region of the "Seven Kingdoms of Kongo dia Nlaza", the eastern regions (also called "Momboares"), "The Seven" in KiKongo, and the coast, especially the Portuguese colony of Luanda.

Crown revenues supported the church, paid by revenue assignments based on royal income. For example, Pedro II (1622–1624) detailed the finances of his royal chapel by specifying that revenues from various estates and provincial incomes would support it. Baptismal and burial fees also supported local churches.

When King Garcia II gave up the island of Luanda and its royal fisheries to the Portuguese in 1651, he switched the kingdom's currency to raffia cloth. The cloth was "napkin-sized" and called mpusu. In the 17th century, 100 mpusu could buy one slave, implying a value greater than that of the nzimbu currency. Raffia cloth was also called Lubongo (singular: Lubongo, Libongo, plural: Mbongo).

=== Marketplace ===
A major cornerstone of the economic and social centre of the people of the Kongo was situated in the market (nzandu). This was an area that was reserved for peace and commerce; the chief authority ensured security here by placing the area in neutral territory that was defended against possible attack. They also provided the freedom to trade as well as the implementation of price standardisations. Areas set aside for the display of merchandise (mbangu) were separated by type, such as an area for blacksmithing equipment, one for slaves, etc. Besides being a commercial centre, it was also a place where political and matrimonial negotiations were carried out, a place for the dissemination of news, an execution area for criminals and where rituals of sorcerers were made.

The connections of these marketplaces were linked by several roads (rich caravans had armed protection from bandits (mpanzulungu), who raided travellers in the late 15th century). These routes were maintained by a compulsory labour force through a collection of tolls to ensure revenue for the capital. Communication and transport were key to commerce. There existed 'royal routes' where trails wider than an ordinary path were built and maintained, with trails cleared to ensure access; where a river needed to be crossed, a two-meter wide vine bridge was created, the maintenance of which were responsible by a system of regional authority.

== Art of the Kongo Kingdom ==
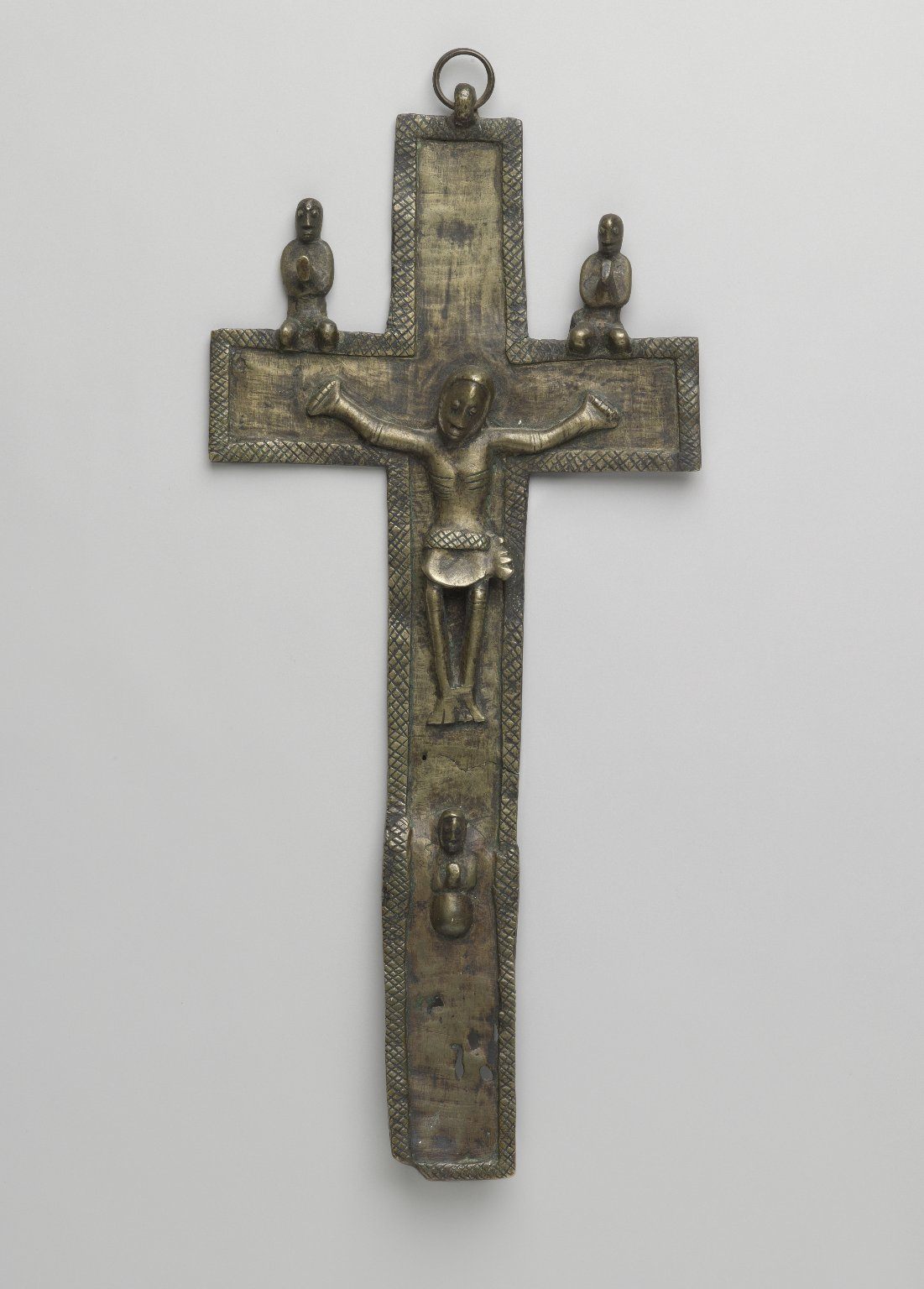
Copper-alloy crucifix, early 17th century

The people of the Kongo are divided into many subgroups including the Yombe, Beembe, Sundi, and others, which share a common language, KiKongo. These groups have many cultural similarities, including that they all produce a huge range of sculptural art. The most notable feature of this region's figurative style is the relative naturalism of the representation of both humans and animals. "The musculature of face and body is carefully rendered, and great attention is paid to items of personal adornment and scarification. Much of the region's art was produced for social and political leaders such as the Kongo king."

=== Architecture ===
The first stone and mortar building in the capital of M'banza-Kongo was a church built by Portuguese craftsmen with the aid of Kongo labourers on 1 June 1491. During the reign of Afonso I in the early 16th century, several stone buildings were constructed in the Kongo capital. For instance, he constructed a stone wall around the royal quarter and a quarter assigned to the Portuguese. The wall stood at a height of 5–6 m (15–20 ft) as it was 0.76 m (2 ft 6 in) and 1 m (3 ft). Afonso also built stone churches and a stone palace starting from 1509. According to scholar Rathbone, the king successfully developed a cadre of Kongolese who could construct and repair stone buildings. At the peak of the capital in the mid 17th century, the city contained stone cathedrals, chapels as well as a Jesuit college and its streets were named. Houses of both the poor and rich were besieged by a fence to serve as a border to the neighbor's house.

== Social structure ==
=== Matrilineal organisation ===
The central Bantu groups which comprised most of the Kongo kingdom passed on status through matrilineal succession. Furthermore, women in the group of kingdoms that at various times were provinces in the Kongo kingdom could have important roles in rulership and war. For example, Queen Nzinga, (Note: Also spelt as Queen Njinga) who ruled parts of the kingdom in Ndongo and Matamba provinces in the 17th century, was an effective ruler and war leader. In fact, she became a thorn in the side of the Portuguese to the degree that their correspondence at times was mainly about how to foil her. Nevertheless, the only thing that ended her efforts against them was her death in 1663 at an advanced age.

== See also ==
- Kongo Civil War
- List of rulers of Kongo
- House of Kinlaza
- House of Kimpanzu
- Kongo textiles
- African military systems to 1800
- African military systems (1800–1900)
- African military systems after 1900

== Bibliography ==
=== Primary sources ===
==== Documentary collections ====
- Brásio, António. Monumenta Missionaria Africana 15 volumes. Lisbon: Agência Geral das Colonias and others, 1952–1988.
- Cuvelier, Jean and Louis Jadin. L'ancien Congo après les archives romaines Brussels, 1954.
- Jadin, Louis. L'ancien Congo et l'Angola 1639–1655 d'après les archives romaines, Portugaises, Néerlandaises et Espagnoles 3 vols., Brussels: Institut historique belge de Rome, 1975.
- Paiva Manso, Levy Jordão. História de Congo (Documentos) Lisbon, 1877.
- Afonso's letters are all published, along with most of the documents relating to his reign, in:

António Brásio, Monumenta Missionaria Africana (1st series, 15 volumes, Lisbon: Agência Geral do Ultramar, 1952–88), vols. 1, 2 and 4.

==== Books and documents ====
- Anguiano, Juan Mateo d'. Missiones Capuchinas en Africa. ed. Buenaventura de Carrocera, 2 vols., Madrid, 1950.
- Atri, Marcellino d'. mod ed. Carlo Toso, L'anarchia congolese nel sec. XVII. La relazione inedita di Marcellino d'Atri. Genoa: Bozzi, 1984.
- W. Holman Bentley, Pioneering on the Congo, London, 1900.
- Cadornega, António de Oliveira de. História geral das guerras angolanas (1680–81). ed. José Matias Delgado and Manuel Alves da Cunha. 3 vols. Lisbon, 1942–44 (reprinted, 1972).
- Carli, Dionigio da Piacenza. Il Moro transportado nell'inclita città di Venezia. Bassano, 1687.
- Carli, Dionigio da Piacenza. Viaggio del Padre Michael Angelo de Guattini da Reggio et del P. Dionigi de Carli da Piacensa...Regno del Congo. (Bologna, 1674). Mod. ed. Francesco Surdich, Milan, 1997. French translation, Michel Chandeigne, Paris, 2006.
- Cardoso, Mateus História do reino de Congo ed. António Brásio, Lisbon, 1969. French translation François Bontinck, 1972.
- Cavazzi da Montecuccolo, Giovanni Antonio. Istorica Descrizione de tre regni Congo, Matamba ed Angola (Bologna, 1687). Portuguese translation by Graziano Saccardo da Luggazano, 2 vols., Lisbon, 1965.
- Dapper, Olfried. Naukeurige beschrijvinge der Africa gewesten. (Amsterdam, 1668) English translation, John Ogilby, London, 1670.
- Franco, António. Synopsis Annalium societatis Jesu in Lusitania ab anno 1540 usque ad annum 1725. Augsburg, 1726.
- Gallo, Bernardo da. "Conto delle Villacazione Missionale..." pub in Carlo Toso, ed. Una pagina poco nota di storia congolese Rome: Edizioni pro Sanctitate, 1999.
- Lucca, Lorenzo da. Letters, mod. trans. Jean Cuvelier, Relations sur le Congo du Père Laurent de Lucques. Brussels, 1954.
- Merolla da Sorrento, Girolamo. Breve e succinta relatione del viaggio nel Congo. Naples, 1692, 2nd ed. 1726.
- Montesarchio, Girolamo da. "Viaggio al Gongho (1669)." mod. ed. Calogero Piazza, La prefetura apostolica del Congo alla metà del XVII secolo. La Relazione inedita di Girolamo da Montesarchio. Milan, 1976.
- Pavia, Andréa da. "Viaggio Apostolico" pub. in Carlo Toso, ed. "Viaggio apostolico in Africa de Andréa da Pavia (inedito del sec. XVII). Rome, 2000.
- Pigafetta, Filippo. Relatione del Regno di Congo et delle circonvince contrade tratta dalli scritti e ragionamenti di Oduarte Lopez Portuguese. Rome, 1591. English translation, Abraham Hartwell, 1594; Ann Hutchinson, 1888.
- Roma, Giovanni Francesco da. Breve relatione del successo della missione de' frati minori cappuccini del serafico P. S. Francesco al regno del Congo. Rome, 1648 (2nd ed. 1649). French translation, François Bontinck, 1964.
- Zucchelli, Antonio da Gradisca. Relatione del viaggio e missione di Congo nell'Ethiopia inferiore occidentale Venice, 1712.

=== Secondary literature ===
- Patrício Batsîkama, A Catedral de São Salvador de Angola: História e Memória de um Lugar Mítico, Universidade Fernando Pessoa Porto, 2011.
- Patrício Batsîkama Mampuya Cipriano, Nação, nacionalidade e nacionalismo em Angola, Universidade Fernando Pessoa Porto, 2015.
- David Birmingham, Trade and Conflict in Angola: The Mbundu and Their Neighbours Under the Influence of the Portuguese, 1483–1790. Oxford and London: Oxford University Press, 1966.
- David Birmingham, A Short History of Modern Angola, Oxford University Press, 2016.
- Olivier de Bouveignes, Les anciens rois du Congo, Namur: Grands Lacs, 1948.
- Ronald H. Chilcote, Protest and resistance in Angola and Brazil: Comparative studies, University of California Press, 1972.
- E. Dartevelle, Les Nzimbu, monnaie du royaume du Congo, Bruxelles, 1953.
- Cécile Fromont, The Art of Conversion: Christian Visual Culture in the Kingdom of Kongo. Chapel Hill: University of North Carolina Press, 2014.
- Cécile Fromont, Images on a Mission in Early Modern Kongo and Angola. University Park: Penn State University Press, 2022.
- Ann Hilton, The Kingdom of Kongo Oxford: Oxford University Press, 1982.
- Karl Edvard Laman,The Kongo. 4 vols. 1954–68.
- Phyllis M. Martin, Power, Cloth and Currency on the Loango Coast, University of Wisconsin Press, 1986.
- Martin Yandesa Mavuzi, Histoire et numismatique des monnaies du Congo du XVe siècle à nos jours ou Les monnaies du Congo – L’histoire et la numismatique, Weyrich Edition, 2015.
- Lussunzi Vita Mbala, La société Kongo face à la colonisation portugaise 1885–1961, Paari éditeur, 2021.
- Graziano Saccardo, Congo e Angola con la storia dell'antica missione dei Cappuccini 3 vols., Venice, 1982–83.
- John K. Thornton, The Kingdom of Kongo: Civil War and Transition, 1641–1718, 1983.
- John K. Thornton, The Kongolese Saint Anthony: Dona Beatriz Kimpa Vita and the Antonian Movement, 1683–1706 Cambridge University Press, 1998.
- John K. Thornton, "The Origins and Early History of the Kingdom of Kongo," International Journal of African Historical Studies 34/1 (2001): 89–120.
- Thornton, John Kelly (1999). Warfare in Atlantic Africa, 1500-1800. Psychology Press. ISBN 9781857283921.
- Jan Vansina, Kingdoms of the Savanna, Madison, WI, University of Wisconsin Press, 1966.
- Jelmer Vos, Empire, Patronage and a Revolt in the Kingdom of Kongo, Old Dominion University, 2017.
- Jelmer Vos, Kongo in the Age of Empire, 1860–1913: The Breakdown of a Moral Order, University of Wisconsin Press, 2015.
- Douglas L. Wheeler, Nineteenth-Century African Protest in Angola: Prince Nicolas of Kongo (1830?–1860), Boston University African Studies Centre, 1968.
