= Battle of Mbumbi =

1622 Portuguese victory over Kongo in Angola

- Part of the Angolan Wars
Date	18 December 1622
Location	Bumbi, Angola 7°01′30″S 14°18′18″E
Result	Portuguese victory

Belligerents
Portuguese Angola	Kingdom of Kongo

Commanders and leaders
Pedro de Sousa Coelho	Dom Paulo Afonso †; Dom Cosme †

Strength
20,000 Mbundu archers 10,000 Portuguese infantry and Imbangala mercenaries	2,000–3,000 archers 200 heavy infantry.

Casualties and losses
Unknown	Heavy losses including much of the light infantry and 90 heavy infantry

The Battle of Mbumbi was a military engagement between forces of Portuguese Angola and the Kingdom of Kongo in 1622. Although the Portuguese were victorious, the battle served as the impetus for the Kingdom of Kongo to expel the Portuguese from their territory.

== Pre-battle situation ==
Portuguese Angola was established in 1575 as a reward to the Portuguese for helping the Kingdom of Kongo defeat the Jagas who invaded the realm in 1568. After a disastrous attempt at conquering the Kingdom of Ndongo, the Portuguese governor Mendes de Vasconcellos made an alliance with the Imbangala, a people described by European and Kongo sources as rootless, cannibal mercenaries originating south of the Kwanza River. The governor used them to destroy the Ndongo while Portuguese Angola reaped the slaves that emerged from the chaos. In 1621, Vasconcellos was succeeded by João Correia de Sousa. Correia de Sousa hoped to reap the same benefits as his predecessor by unleashing the Imbangala into Kongo territory. He first targeted the forest land of Kazanze, a Kongo vassal that had been a haven for runaway slaves from Portuguese Angola. Correia de Sousa then ordered Captain Major Pedro de Sousa Coelho and 20,000 Mbundu and Portuguese with an Imbangala contingent into Nambu a Ngongo inside the Kongo province of Mbamba. The area fell after its lord fled to the commercial town of Bumbi.

== Preparation ==
Captain-Major Sousa Coelho marched on Bumbi with 30,000 men, most of which were Mbundu archers supplemented by Portuguese heavy infantry and Imbangala mercenaries. Inside the town, the Duke of Mbamba Paulo Afonso and the Marquis of Pemba Cosme led the Kongo forces. They had gathered about 3,000 men as light infantry (bowmen) augmented by 200 nobles fighting as traditional heavy infantry (sword and shield). Before giving battle on 18 December 1622, the Duke of Mbamba made Confession and received the Holy Sacraments before arming himself with sword, shield and relics of various saints.

== Battle ==
At the start of the battle, both sides gave the battle cry "Santiago!" before engaging. The Kongo forces, seeing this coincidence, remarked that if the Portuguese saint was white, theirs was black. The Duke's forces initiated the battle routing the Mbundu archers whose ranks had swollen to some 30,000 by the time of the battle. But just as in Ndongo, the Imbangala mercenaries would not yield and destroyed the Kongo force with a counterattack. The duke, marquis, 90 lesser nobles and thousands of common soldiers were all slain. According to Jesuit accounts of the battle, the Portuguese succeeded in taking many slaves from the battle and sacked the whole settlement, not sparing the possessions of the Portuguese established there. The Imbangala, as was their custom, cannibalized many prisoners and those slain, including the bodies of the Duke of Mbamba and the Marquis of Pemba.

== Aftermath ==
The Battle of Mbumbi sent shockwaves through the entire Kingdom of Kongo. Anti-Portuguese riots broke out all over Kongo, resulting in widespread bloodshed. The newly crowned King Pedro II was forced to put those Portuguese that could be saved under his protection at his camp at Mbanda Kasi where he was gathering his forces for a counterattack. The Portuguese victory at Mbumbi put a final nail in the coffin of Kongo-Portuguese friendship. Kongo declared war on Portuguese Angola and fought them out of Kongo and even taking territories that had been under the rule of Portuguese Angola. A final consequence of the battle was King Pedro II's letter campaign to the Dutch proposing an alliance that would culminate twenty years later in an invasion of Angola.

== See also ==
- History of Angola
