= Seven Kingdoms of Kongo dia Nlaza =

Confederation of states in west Central Africa

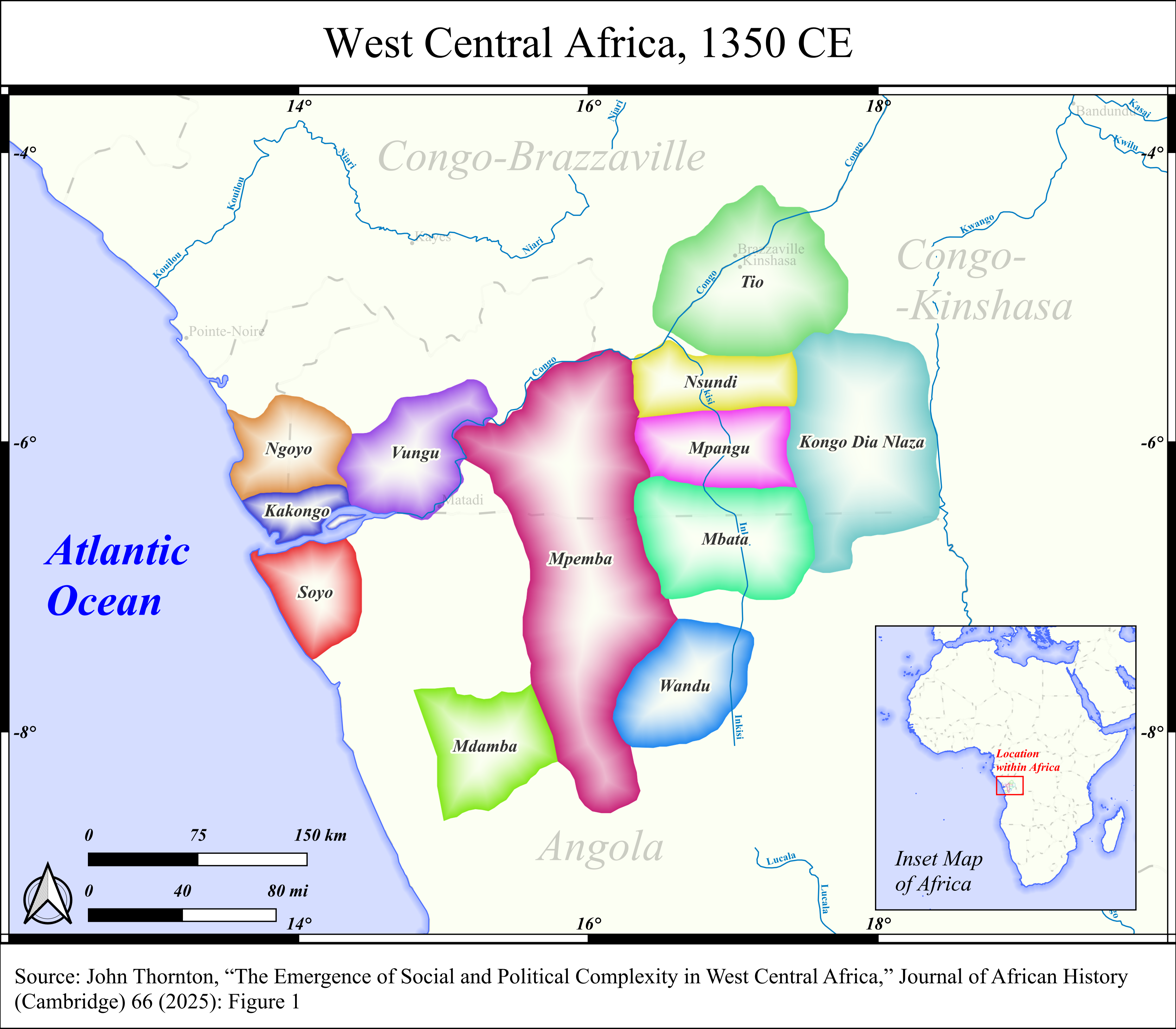
States of the western Congo Basin, c. 1350

The Seven Kingdoms of Kongo dia Nlaza were a confederation of states in west Central Africa at least from the 13th century. They were absorbed into the Kingdom of Kongo in the 16th century, being mentioned in the titles of King Álvaro II in 1583. It neighboured the confederations of Vungu and Mpemba. Its capital district was on the Kwale River, and it controlled the lands eastwards to the Kwango River, northwards to the Pool Malebo, and westwards to the Inkisi River and north of the Kwilu River. This polity or region was first mentioned in texts of the Kingdom of Kongo in the late 16th century, although it probably existed much earlier. It was only then being incorporated into Kongo, through the kingdom's eastern province of Mbata. It is unclear what the Seven Kingdoms were, though perhaps they included Kundi and Okanga. Presumably these kingdoms represented an alliance of several smaller polities, though the sources of the time tell us nothing about it.

The Seven Kingdoms were also called Momboares in the 17th-century text of the Portuguese Jesuit priest, Mateus Cardoso, which offers an extensive description of the region. Cardoso noted that the region was famous in his day for the large amount of cloth that it produced, some of which was exported to the Portuguese colonial city of Luanda, Angola. Reports of the early 17th century suggest that the Seven Kingdoms exported as much as 100,000 metres of cloth annually to that market alone, suggesting that its total production must have been several times higher, putting in on a par with other major textile centers in the world, including areas of equivalent size in Europe and India.

Cardoso's description also indicated that the original kingdom included in its western extension, the kingdoms of Nsundi, Mpangu and Mbata, all of which eventually became a part of the Kingdom of Kongo, probably in the fifteenth century. The kingdom of Mbata was particularly important as its alliance with Kongo's founding ruler helped establish the Kingdom of Kongo. Mbata held the title of Nkaka andi Mwene Kongo, meaning "grandfather of the King of Kongo" and suggesting that initially it was the senior, or perhaps elder partner. This suggests that the Seven Kingdoms were considerable older than Kongo, thus placing its founding perhaps in the thirteenth century. Research by Jan Vansina proposes that the origin of larger political structures began within the northern reaches of the kingdom at about this time, on linguistic evidence.

When the Kingdom of Kongo took over Kongo dia Nlaza it was partially integrated into the province of Mbata which led the expansion eastward.

== Sources ==
Graziano Saccardo, Congo e Angola con la storia del antica missione dei cappuccini, (3 vols, Milan, 1982–83)
