= Nsundi =

Province in the Kingdom of the Congo

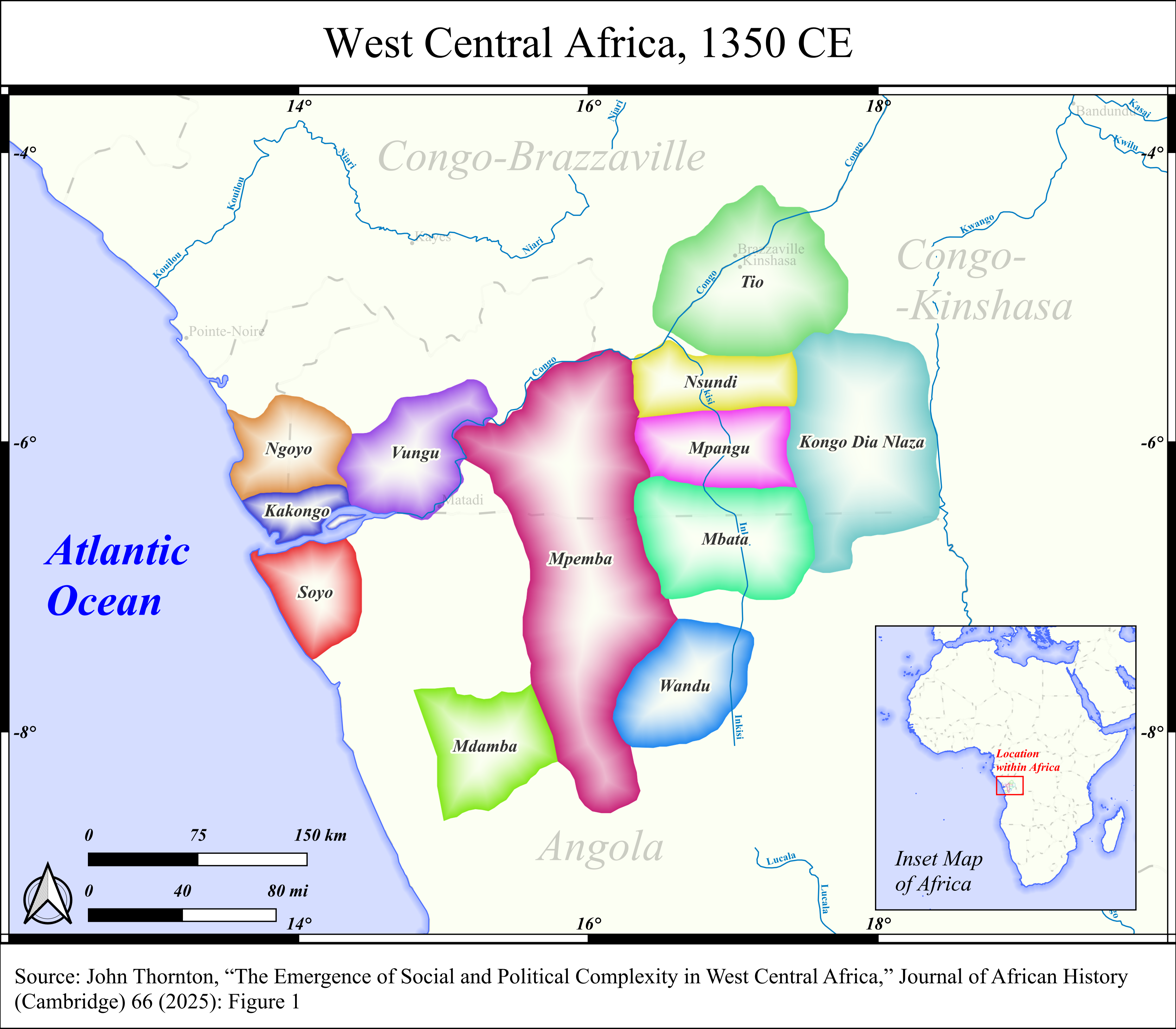
States of the western Congo Basin, c. 1350

Nsundi was a province of the old Kingdom of Kongo. Its capital was located on the Inkisi River, near the present-day village of Mbanza Nsundi in Democratic Republic of Congo.

== History ==
According to traditions retold by Duarte Lopes, Kongo's ambassador to Rome, and published by Filippo Pigafetta in 1591, Nsundi was formerly an independent small kingdom. It was extensive and had a number of small sub-provinces under it. It was originally one of several small kingdoms that formed part of the Seven Kingdoms of Kongo dia Nlaza.

It was conquered by Kongo probably in the early to mid-fifteenth century.

Nsundi was often given to the king's chosen successor to rule. The earliest known ruler of Nsundi was Afonso I of Kongo. A son of Nzinga a Nkuwu, who reigned in the late fifteenth century, Afonso Mvemba a Nzinga became king in turn in 1507. But the subsequent history of the country does not support the idea that the heir apparent always held this post, and kings of Kongo came from many different provinces.

Nsundi was a royal province, meaning that the king appointed its high official on a limited term, often three years. When King Álvaro II renamed the provincial nobility along European lines in the late sixteenth century, Nsundi was declared a Duchy. One of the more powerful of its dukes, Manuel Jordão, served as something of a king-maker in the period 1624-28. He was humiliated and removed by King Ambrósio I in 1628.

During the civil wars that followed the Battle of Mbwila in 1665, Nsundi gradually became more or less independent under a line of dukes from the Kimpanzu branch of the royal family.

=== Archaeological work ===
In 2015-2018 an archaeological team called KongoKing began excavations at the site of Kindoki and subsequently discovered enough material evidence to identify the site as the mbanza (capital) of Nsundi from the late seventeenth to the nineteenth centuries. According to W. Holman Bentley, a British Baptist Missionary in Kongo in 1879, the last Duke of Nsundi had not been buried for want of a successor, and thus the body was retained, carefully mummified and protected from about 1835 until Bentley reported it. This date conforms quite closely to the date of the last burials at Kindoki.
