= Olivella nana =

Sparkling dwarf olive

Scientific classification
- Kingdom: Animalia
- Phylum: Mollusca
- Class: Gastropoda
- Subclass: Caenogastropoda
- Order: Neogastropoda
- Family: Olividae
- Genus: Olivella
- Species: O. nana

Binomial name
- Olivella nana (Lamarck, 1811)

Synonyms
- Oliva nana Lamarck, 1811 (basionym); Oliva zenopira Duclos, 1835; Olivancillaria nana (Lamarck, 1811); Olivancillaria zenopira (Duclos, 1835) (Duclos, 1835)

Species of gastropod

Olivella nana, common name the sparkling dwarf olive, is a species of small sea snail, marine gastropod mollusk in the subfamily Olivellinae, in the family Olividae, the olives. Species in the genus Olivella are commonly called dwarf olives.

The shells of Olivella nana, harvested on Luanda Island, were used as currency called nzimbu in the Kingdom of Kongo and nji in the Tio Kingdom, and were even traded north as far as the Kingdom of Benin.

== Taxonomy ==
Oliva nana Lamarck, 1811, described from the coast of Angola, was included in the genus Olivancillaria by Fischer (1887) and later cited by many authors in the same genus (e.g. Dautzenberg 1912, Odhner 1923, Nickles 1950, Klappenbach 1965, Burnay & Conceição 1983, etc.). However, the presence of an operculum excludes it from Olivancillaria. Abbott & Dance (1986) included it in Olivella, which appears to be a more accurate assignation.

== Description ==
The length of the shell varies between 10 mm and 20 mm. The color of the shell is dark, shining horn. There is some variation in the coloration in this species which changes from horn to white in some specimens at the point where the whorls of the protoconch and the teleoconch join. In some other specimens the change is continued on the first or second whorl of the teleoconch.

The apex is small, flattened, smooth and shining. This is the flattest apex in this genus. The apex consists of 11/2 carinated whorls that are rapidly enlarging. The carina appears on the first half of the first whorl and is very strong. The sutures of both the protoconch and the teleoconch are deeply channeled.

== Distribution ==
This species occurs in the Atlantic Ocean from Cape Verdes to West Africa and Angola; in the Indian Ocean off Madagascar.
