= Jaga (Kongo) =

Term applied by the Portuguese to some African tribes

The Jaga or Jagas were terms applied by the Portuguese to invading bands of African warriors east and south of the Kingdom of Kongo. The use of the phrase took on different connotations depending on where it was applied. There were two groups of people, both known as fierce warriors, who were dubbed jagas or the jaga. Unbeknownst to the Portuguese who encountered these warriors, the two groups were practically unrelated; they were the Yaka and the Imbangala.

== The "Jaga" Question ==
In the 17th century there were a number of theories proposed by missionaries and geographers that connected these two groups to other marauding groups operating as far afield as Somalia, Angola and Sierra Leone and ultimately to some great "Jaga homeland" somewhere in central Africa. While more recent scholarship dismissed these earlier claims, in the 1960 a number of scholars proposed that oral traditions of the Lunda Empire, when compared with those of some Angolan groups, suggested that the Jaga invasion of Kongo and the Jagas of Angola were in fact groups of conquerors fleeing from Lunda in the 16th century.

In 1972 Joseph C. Miller presented a review of the available evidence and argued that the group that invaded Kongo was completely distinct from the group that invaded Angola, so that the second group should properly be called "Imbangala". This distinction is now widely accepted among scholars operating in this field. The invaders of Kongo are thought to have originated from a province of Mwene Muji.

== Yaka Jagas ==
The Portuguese first learned about a people they called "jagas" during Kongo's 1556 war with the Mbundu kingdom of Ndongo. Among Ndongo's regular forces were mercenary warriors of the Yaka ethnic group. The Yaka had a reputation for ferocity and were said to come from the far interior. They inhabited the middle reaches of the Kwango valley, making them the eastern neighbors to the Mbundu and BaKongo. These particular "jagas" were constant victims of the Kongo slave trade and eventually invaded their western neighbor in 1568. This forced the Portuguese to intervene with some 600 matchlockmen on behalf of then king Alvaro I. Though forced completely out of Kongo by the mid-1570s, they continued to be a force on the border. They later supplied many mercenary troops to Kongo during its civil war.

The Portuguese intervention in the war with the Jaga increased their power in the Kingdom of Kongo. This led to increased trade in favor of Portugal and a seat for priests on the Kongo electoral council.

== Imbangala Jagas ==
The Portuguese also encountered another fierce warrior people, this time further south beyond the Kwanza River. The actual name of these people was Imbangala. The origins of these people is still debated, but they are also believed to have immigrated from the Lunda Empire, rejecting that state's political changes. The Imbangala were known to be notoriously cruel and also ritually cannibalistic. They were used to good effect as mercenary elements in the Portuguese army during its conquest of Angola. Once introduced into central Angola, the Imbangala settled there, forming the kingdom of Kasanje on the Kwango River.

== See also ==
- History of Angola
- Kasanze Kingdom
- Lunda Empire
- Portuguese Angola
- Yaka people
