= Royal Council of the Kingdom of Kongo =

The Royal Council of the Kingdom of Kongo (Kongo: Ne Mbanda-Mbanda or Mbanda Mbanda meaning "the top of the top") was the governing body of officials and nobles of the Kingdom of Kongo from the 15th to 17th century. In theory, the king could not declare war, make or take appointments, and open or close roads without the consent of this council.

== Divisions of the Council ==
The kingdom was governed in concert by the Mwene Kongo and the royal council known as the ne mbanda-mbanda. It was composed of twelve members divided into three groups. One group were bureaucrats, another who were electors and a last of matrons. Senior officials chose the Mwene Kongo or king who served for life following their choice. Electors varied over time, and there was probably never a completely fixed list; rather, senior officials who exercised power did so. Many kings tried to choose their successor, not always successfully.

=== Bureaucratic Posts ===
These four, non-electing posts, were composed of the Mwene Lumbo (lord of the palace/major-domo), Mfila Ntu (most trusted councilor/prime minister), Mwene Vangu-Vangu (lord of deeds or actions/high judge particularly in adultery cases), and Mwene Bampa (treasurer). These four are all appointed by the king and have great influence on the day-to-day operations of the court.

=== Electors ===
Another four councilors worked to elect the king as well as man important posts. The electors are composed of the Mwene Vunda (lord of Vunda, a small territory north of the capital with mostly religious obligations whom leads the electors), the Mwene Mbata (lord of Mbata province directly east of the capital and run by the Nsaka Lau kanda which provides the king's great wife), Mwene Soyo (lord of Soyo province west of the capital and historically the wealthiest province due to it being the only port and having access to salt), and a fourth elector, likely the Mwene Mbamba (lord of Mbamba province south of the capital and captain-general of the armies). The Mwene Vunda was appointed by the king from the Nsaku ne Vunda kanda. The Mwene Mbata was nominally confirmed by the king from the Nsaku Lau kanda. The Mwene Soyo was appointed by the king from the Da Silva kanda. The Mwene Mbamba was appointed by the king from anywhere he desired, but was usually a close family relation. These four men elected the king, while the Mwene Vunda and Mwene Mbata played crucial roles in the coronation.

=== Matrons ===
Lastly, the council contained four women with great influence on the council. They were led by the Mwene Nzimba Mpungu, a queen-mother, usually being the king's paternal aunt. The next most powerful woman was the Mwene Mbanda, the king's great wife, chosen from the Nsaku Lau kanda. The other two posts were given to the next most important women in the kingdom, being widowed queens dowager or the matriarchs of former ruling kandas.

== See also ==
- Kingdom of Kongo
