= Battle of Mbanda Kasi =

Military engagement

Battle of Mbandi Kasi
- Part of the Angolan Wars
Date	January 1623
Location	Mbandi Kasi, Angola
Result	Kongo victory

Belligerents
Portuguese Angola	Kingdom of Kongo

Commanders and leaders
Pedro de Sousa Coelho	Pedro II; Dom Antonio Manuel

Strength
Several thousand Mbundu archers Several thousand Portuguese infantry and Imbangala mercenaries	Unknown

Casualties and losses
Heavy losses	Unknown

The Battle of Mbandi Kasi was a military engagement between forces of Portuguese Angola and the Kingdom of Kongo during their first armed conflict which spanned from 1622 to 1623. The battle, while not widely reported by the Portuguese, was recorded in correspondence between the Kongolese and their Dutch allies. The battle marked the turn of the short war in the favor of Kongo and led to the ouster of the Portuguese governor of Luanda and the return of Kongolese subjects taken as slaves in earlier campaigns.

As a result of the conflict, the manikongo Pedro II sought an alliance with the Dutch Empire to drive the Portuguese from the region entirely.

== See also ==
- First Kongo-Portuguese War
- Portuguese Angola
- Kingdom of Kongo
- History of Angola
