= Tumba (Kongo) =

Grave sculptures from Zaire and Angola

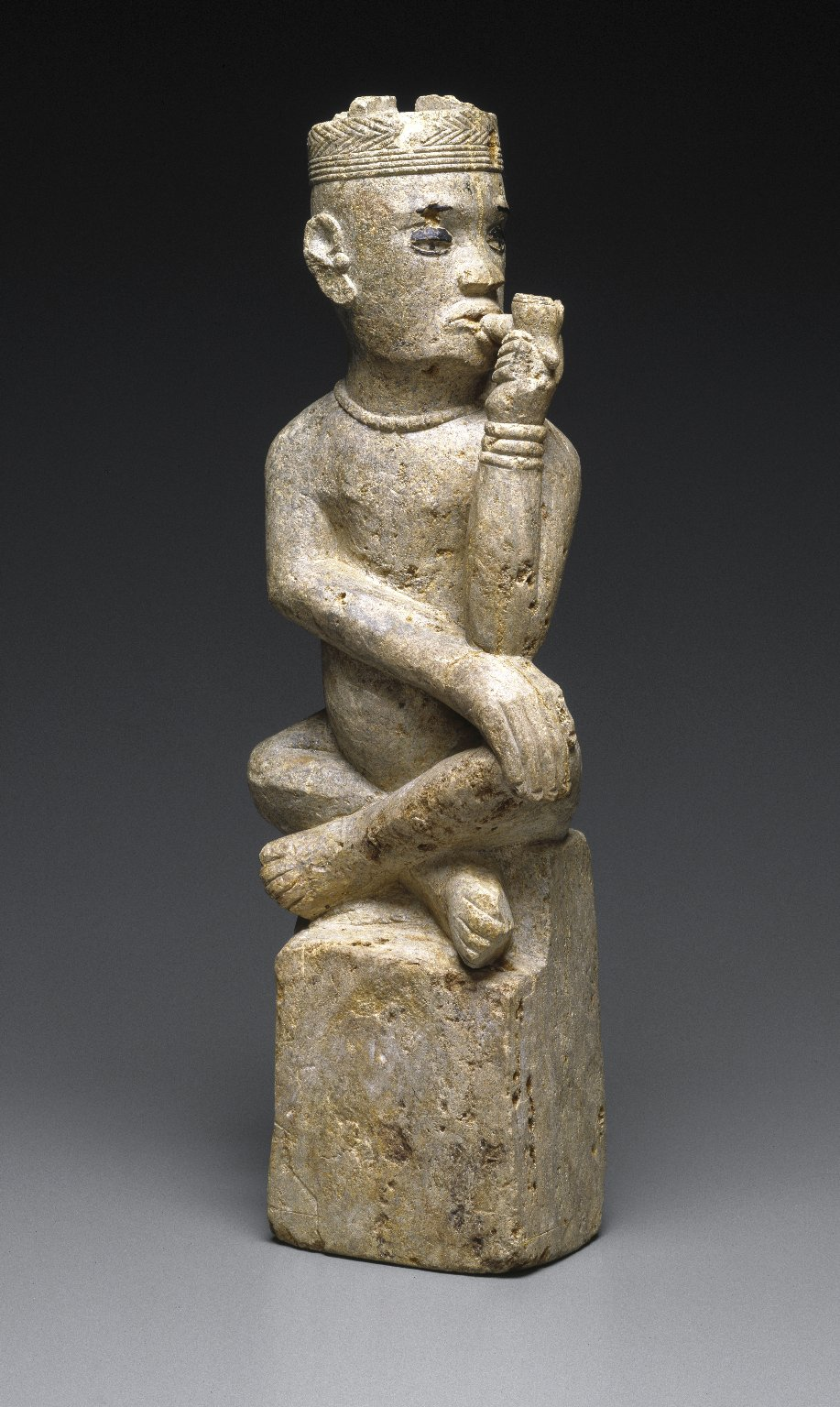
Tumba, from the collection of the Brooklyn Museum

The Kongo place stone figures called tumba (a Ki-Kongo word, pl. bitumba) on the graves of powerful people. Bitumba were created in Zaire and Angola during the nineteenth century and the first part of the twentieth.

== Etymology ==
Tumba is derived from the Kikongo word tumbama, which means "to be placed or set before". In the Punu language of the neighbouring Republic of Congo, the word itumbe means "image, engraving, statue", showing a relation.

== Materials and Dimensions ==
Bitumba were executed in soft stone. Their average height it close to 50 centimeters; the smallest bitumba measure between 15 and 20 centimeters and the largest are approximately a meter in height.

== Historiography ==
Artist Robert Verly gathered a large number of statues in the north of Angola near the Zaire border and, in the May 1955 issue of Zaire, he classified the objects by type and proposed an explanation for their use. In July 1978, the Institut des Musees Nationaux du Zaire at the Center for International Commerce of Zaire in Kinshasa mounted an exhibition of 72 bitumba called "Sculptures Stones from Lower Zaire."

== Styles and Themes ==
Bitumba sculptures are unique in their variety of styles. Robert Farris Thompson has identified about twenty workshops that explain stylistic individuality. The wide dispersal of the works, however, has made it impossible to localize their centers of production.

Bitumba are express a variety of themes. The most widely found - about twenty percent of statues belong to this type - is a figure who raises his hands in front of his face in a gesture often interpreted as praying. The second most prevalent theme is that of mother and child. The art of Lower Zaire, and especially the art of Mayombe, is known for privileging maternity subjects. The third theme is that of the "thinker," who holds on hand on the hip and the other pressed to check in an attitude of meditation.
