= Kasanze Kingdom =

African polity

The Kasanze Kingdom, also known as Kasanye, (c. 1500-1648) was a pre-colonial Central West African state in what is today Angola.

== Origin ==
Kasanze was founded by the BaLunda people of Central Africa living on the border of the Kingdom of Kongo. Initially a client state of Kongo, it first entered written record during the reign of Diogo I of Kongo in 1548. During this time it was ruled by a ManiKasanze.

== Conflict with Portugal ==
In 1576, Paulo Dias de Novais launched an attack into Kasanze in hopes of opening up trade routes into the interior. The invasion met with initial success under the leadership of Lieutenant João Castanho Veles. After the engagement, the men became careless during their return march to Luanda. Kasanze launched a surprise attack on the Portuguese force that caused the invaders severe losses. Despite later efforts to mend fences (and open trade) Kasanze remained hostile to Portuguese overtures and a wall toward further penetration east.

== Independence ==
Kasanze became completely autonomous of Kongo by 1600. It continued to be a buffer between commerce of the interior and the ambitions of the Portuguese in Luanda. All the while it tapped trade in raffia cloth and ivory from the interior, which were hot commodities among the Mbundu to their south.

== War of 1622 ==
After years of failed attempts to remove th ManiKasanje from his fortification on the Bengo River, another Portuguese assault was launched under the command of Correia de Sousa. The Portuguese surrounded and cut through much of the foliage that had protected the state, eventually capturing the king and sending many of his nobles to Brazil as slaves. The king was executed by having his throat slit on the orders of de Sousa himself.

== Reemergence of Kasanze ==
Once the Portuguese crown learned of de Sousa's excesses, they took action to weaken the autonomy of all Luanda governors. By 1641, a descendant of the dead king, the panji a ndona, rallied the remnants to reestablish the state. The panji a ndona was even less trusting of Europeans than his predecessor attacking any white coming to close to his nsaka or redoubt, despite being in alliance with the Dutch.

== Destruction ==
Kasanze had managed to become a thorn to both the Portuguese and Dutch. As part of Portuguese capitulation after the Dutch seizure of Luanda, the Portuguese were tasked with dealing with Kasanze. The Portuguese were unsuccessful until 1648, after retaking Luanda. Salvador Correia de Sá e Benevides, the new governor, made destroying Kasanze his first priority. He sent a force under Diogo Gomes de Sampaio including the Imbangala chief Kabuka ka Ndonga to face panji a ndona's forces. The Portuguese force was victorious. Panji a Ndona fled north but was overwhelmed by Portuguese ammunition, surrendering in 1649.

== See also ==
- Kingdom of Kongo
- Lunda Empire
- Ndongo
- Matamba
- Imbangala
- History of Angola
