= Mpemba (disambiguation) =

Mpemba is an African name that may refer to

- Mpemba, a 13th century confederation in the Congo Basin
- Mpemba Kasi, a 14th century Bantu kingdom and northernmost territory of Mpemba, which was incorporated into the founding of the Kingdom of Kongo
- Erasto B. Mpemba (born 1950), Tanzanian game warden who discovered the Mpemba effect in water
- Parisel Mpemba (born 1978), team handball player from the Democratic Republic of the Congo
- Mpemba effect
