= Medieval and early modern Africa =

Medieval and early modern history of the African region

The medieval and early modern history of Africa spans from the medieval and early modern period until the colonial period in the history of Africa. (Note: There is no agreed upon periodisation for African history, with the different temporal stages of state formation providing disagreement. The European terms "ancient", "medieval", and "modern" have been criticised as failing to represent African realities and capture its complexity.)

== Central Africa ==
=== Sao civilization ===
The Sao civilization flourished from about the sixth century BC to as late as the 16th century AD in Central Africa. The Sao lived by the Chari River south of Lake Chad in territory that later became part of present-day Cameroon and Chad. They are the earliest people to have left clear traces of their presence in the territory of modern Cameroon. Today, several ethnic groups of northern Cameroon and southern Chad – but particularly the Sara people – claim descent from the civilization of the Sao. Sao artifacts show that they were skilled workers in bronze, copper, and iron. Finds include bronze sculptures and terracotta statues of human and animal figures, coins, funerary urns, household utensils, jewelry, highly decorated pottery, and spears. The largest Sao archaeological finds have occurred south of Lake Chad.

=== Kanem Empire ===
The Kanem and Bornu Empires in 1810

The Kanem Empire was centered in the Chad Basin. It was known as the Kanem Empire from the 9th century AD onward and lasted as the independent kingdom of Bornu until 1893. At its height it encompassed an area covering not only much of Chad, but also parts of modern southern Libya, eastern Niger, northeastern Nigeria, northern Cameroon, parts of South Sudan and the Central African Republic. The history of the Empire is mainly known from the Royal Chronicle or Girgam discovered in 1851 by the German traveller Heinrich Barth. Kanem rose in the 8th century in the region to the north and east of Lake Chad. The Kanem empire went into decline, shrank, and in the 14th century was defeated by Bilala invaders from the Lake Fitri region.

Around the 9th century AD, the central Sudanic Empire of Kanem, with its capital at Njimi, was founded by the Kanuri-speaking nomads. Kanem arose by engaging in the trans-Saharan trade. It exchanged slaves captured by raiding the south for horses from North Africa, which in turn aided in the acquisition of slaves. By the late 11th century, the Islamic Sayfawa (Saifawa) dynasty was founded by Humai (Hummay) ibn Salamna. The Sayfawa dynasty ruled for 771 years, making it one of the longest-lasting dynasties in human history. In addition to trade, taxation of local farms around Kanem became a source of state income. Kanem reached its peak under Mai (king) Dunama Dibalemi ibn Salma (1210–1248). The empire reportedly was able to field 40,000 cavalry, and it extended from Fezzan in the north to the Sao state in the south. Islam became firmly entrenched in the empire. Pilgrimages to Mecca were common; Cairo had hostels set aside specifically for pilgrims from Kanem.

=== Bornu Empire ===
The Kanuri people led by the Sayfuwa migrated to the west and south of Lake Chad, where they established the Bornu Empire. By the late 16th century the Bornu empire had expanded and recaptured the parts of Kanem that had been conquered by the Bulala. Satellite states of Bornu included the Damagaram in the west and Baguirmi to the southeast of Lake Chad.

Around 1400, the Sayfawa dynasty moved its capital to Bornu, a tributary state southwest of Lake Chad with a new capital Birni Ngarzagamu. Overgrazing had caused the pastures of Kanem to become too dry. In addition, political rivalry from the Bilala clan was becoming intense. Moving to Bornu better situated the empire to exploit the trans-Saharan trade and to widen its network in that trade. Links to the Hausa states were also established, providing horses and salt from Bilma for Bonoman gold. Mai Ali Gazi ibn Dunama (c. 1475 – 1503) defeated the Bilala, reestablishing complete control of Kanem. During the early 16th century, the Sayfawa dynasty solidified its hold on the Bornu population after much rebellion. In the latter half of the 16th century, Mai Idris Alooma modernized its military, in contrast to the Songhai Empire. Turkish mercenaries were used to train the military. The Sayfawa dynasty were the first monarchs south of the Sahara to import firearms. The empire controlled all of the Sahel from the borders of Darfur in the east to Hausaland to the west. Friendly relationship was established with the Ottoman Empire via Tripoli. The Mai exchanged gifts with the Ottoman sultan.

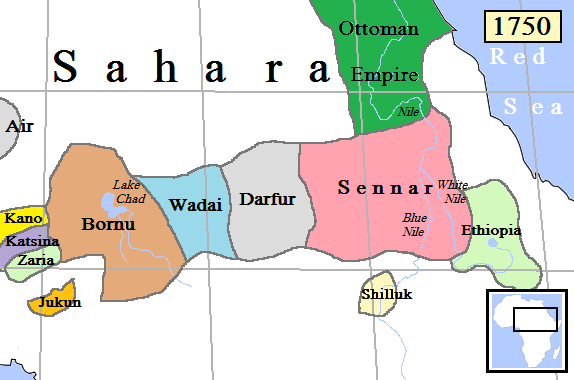
Major states of Middle Africa in 1750

During the 17th and 18th centuries, not much is known about Bornu. During the 18th century, it became a center of Islamic learning. However, Bornu's army became outdated by not importing new arms, and Kamembu had also begun its decline. The power of the mai was undermined by droughts and famine that were becoming more intense, internal rebellion in the pastoralist north, growing Hausa power, and the importation of firearms which made warfare more bloody. By 1841, the last mai was deposed, bringing to an end the long-lived Sayfawa dynasty. In its place, the al-Kanemi dynasty of the shehu rose to power.

=== Shilluk Kingdom ===
The Shilluk Kingdom was centered in South Sudan from the 15th century from along a strip of land along the western bank of the White Nile, from Lake No to about 12° north latitude. The capital and royal residence was in the town of Fashoda. The kingdom was founded during the mid-15th century AD by its first ruler, Nyikang. During the 19th century, the Shilluk Kingdom faced decline following military assaults from the Ottoman Empire and later British and Sudanese colonization in Anglo-Egyptian Sudan.

=== Baguirmi Kingdom ===
The Kingdom of Baguirmi existed as an independent state during the 16th and 17th centuries southeast of Lake Chad in what is now the country of Chad. Baguirmi emerged to the southeast of the Kanem–Bornu Empire. The kingdom's first ruler was Mbang Birni Besse. Later in his reign, the Bornu Empire conquered the state and made it a tributary.

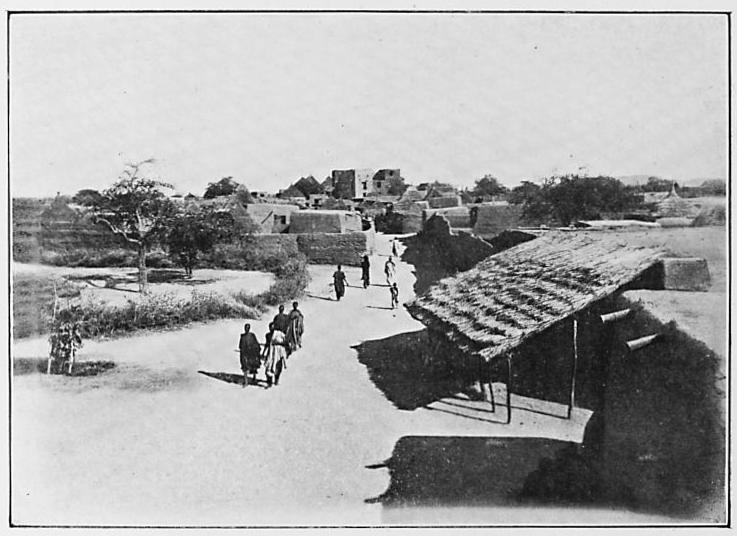
Abéché, capital of Wadai, in 1918 after the French had taken over

=== Wadai Empire ===
The Wadai Empire was centered on Chad and the Central African Republic from the 17th century. The Tunjur people founded the Wadai Kingdom to the east of Bornu in the 16th century. In the 17th century there was a revolt of the Maba people who established a Muslim dynasty.

At first Wadai paid tribute to Bornu and Durfur, but by the 18th century Wadai was fully independent and had become an aggressor against its neighbors.To the west of Bornu, by the 15th century the Kingdom of Kano had become the most powerful of the Hausa Kingdoms, in an unstable truce with the Kingdom of Katsina to the north. Both were absorbed into the Sokoto Caliphate during the Fulani Jihad of 1805, which threatened Bornu itself.

=== Luba Empire ===
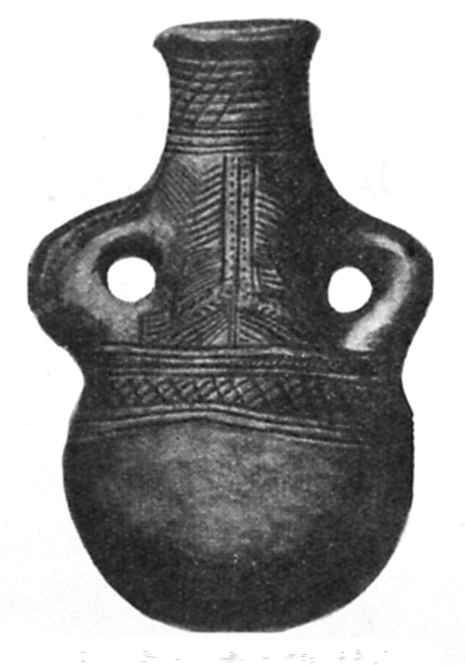
Luba pottery

Sometime between 1300 and 1400 AD, Kongolo Mwamba (Nkongolo) from the Balopwe clan unified the various Luba peoples, near Lake Kisale. He founded the Kongolo dynasty, which was later ousted by Kalala Ilunga. Kalala expanded the kingdom west of Lake Kisale. A new centralized political system of spiritual kings (balopwe) with a court council of head governors and sub-heads all the way to village heads. The balopwe was the direct communicator with the ancestral spirits and chosen by them. Conquered states were integrated into the system and represented in the court, with their titles. The authority of the balopwe resided in his spiritual power rather than his military authority. The army was relatively small. The Luba was able to control regional trade and collect tribute for redistribution. Numerous offshoot states were formed with founders claiming descent from the Luba. The Luba political system spread throughout Central Africa, southern Uganda, Rwanda, Burundi, Malawi, Zambia, Zimbabwe, and the western Congo. Two major empires claiming Luba descent were the Lunda Empire and Maravi Empire. The Bemba people and Basimba people of northern Zambia were descended from Luba migrants who arrived in Zambia during the 17th century.

=== Lunda Empire ===
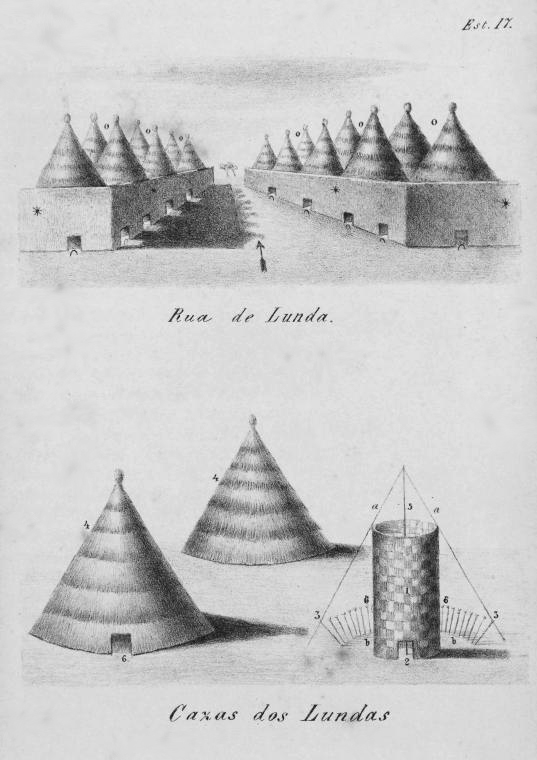
Lunda town and dwelling

In the 1450s, a Luba from the royal family Ilunga Tshibinda married Lunda queen Rweej and united all Lunda peoples. Their son mulopwe Luseeng expanded the kingdom. His son Naweej expanded the empire further and is known as the first Lunda emperor, with the title mwato yamvo (mwaant yaav, mwant yav), the Lord of Vipers. The Luba political system was retained, and conquered peoples were integrated into the system. The mwato yamvo assigned a cilool or kilolo (royal adviser) and tax collector to each state conquered.

Numerous states claimed descent from the Lunda. The Imbangala of inland Angola claimed descent from a founder, Kinguri, brother of Queen Rweej, who could not tolerate the rule of mulopwe Tshibunda. Kinguri became the title of kings of states founded by Queen Rweej's brother. The Luena (Lwena) and Lozi (Luyani) in Zambia also claim descent from Kinguri. During the 17th century, a Lunda chief and warrior called Mwata Kazembe set up an Eastern Lunda kingdom in the valley of the Luapula River. The Lunda's western expansion also saw claims of descent by the Yaka and the Pende. The Lunda linked Central Africa with the western coast trade. The kingdom of Lunda came to an end in the 19th century when it was invaded by the Chokwe, who were armed with guns.

=== Kingdom of Kongo ===
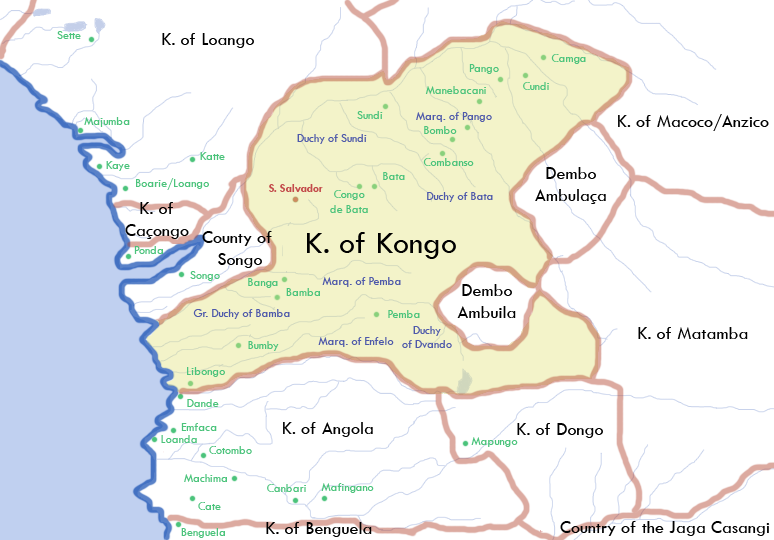
Kongo in 1711

By the 13th century there were three main confederations of states in the western Congo Basin around Pool Malebo. The Seven Kingdoms of Kongo dia Nlaza, considered to be the oldest and most powerful, likely included Nsundi, Mbata, Mpangu, and possibly Kundi and Okanga. South of these was Mpemba which stretched from its capital in northern Angola 200 km north to the Congo River. It included various kingdoms such as Mpemba Kasi, its northernmost and remotest component, and Vunda. To its west across the Congo River was a confederation of three small states; Vungu (its leader), Kakongo, and Ngoyo.

The formation of the Kingdom of Kongo began in the late 13th century. Kongo oral traditions hold that Ntinu Wene (lit. "King of the Kingdom") crossed the Congo River from Vungu to conquer Mpemba Kasi, known as the "Mother of Kongo". (Note: The choice of a title over a personal name indicates that this is more representative of symbolic relationships and rights of rulership rather than real events.) The first kings ruled from Nsi a Kwilu, a valley and old religious centre, which produced iron and steel, and linked the copper and textile-producing north to the south. Around the 1350s Nimi Nzima established an alliance with the rulers of Mbata, who were looking to break away from the Seven Kingdoms, and agreed to secure each other's dynasties, making them known as the "Grandfather of Kongo".

Tradition holds that Nimi Nzima's son, Lukeni lua Nimi, wishing to aggrandise himself, built a fortress and blocked and taxed commerce. One day his pregnant aunt refused to pay the toll, and in a rage he killed her. While reprehensible, his action won him followers due to his determination and valour and allowed him to embark on conquests. To the south the market town of Mpangala, itself a sub unit of Vunda, was absorbed, with Vunda also styled as a Grandfather. This weakening of the Mpemba confederation precipitated its conquest and integration into the Kingdom of Kongo. Lukeni lua Nimi also conquered Kabunga in the west, whose leaders were regional religious leaders, not dissimilar from popes. From there Soyo and Mbamba were conquered.

The power and resources gained from these conquests allowed Kongo to expand north into Nsundi, which had multiple sub-units. Traditionally, a governor on Nsundi's western border forebode entry until they had fought a symbolic battle. Kongo conquered Nsundi and delegated it to a royal governor, who greatly expanded the territory, conquering Nsanga and Masinga. Northeast, Teke oral tradition holds that Mabiala Mantsi united the Bateke tribes, centralised his governance, and expanded using militaristic and diplomatic skill. Kongo's conquests eastward brought it into conflict with the formidable Teke Kingdom which halted their expansion. This expansion had primarily been done by allying and co-opting polities. By the late 15th century, Kongo had developed a new administrative system which would increase its centralisation, and after integrating Vunda, they set about conquering these polities and converting them into royal provinces.

Small confederations, like Kisama, often put up spirited and successful resistance to either internal consolidation by aggressive components, or external conquest and integration. To the south around the highlands of Angola the Ambundu kingdoms of Ndongo and Matamba formed. The Dembos confederation sat between them and Kongo. Ndongo had come under tributary status to Kongo by the 16th century, and oral traditions collected in the 17th century hold their founder, Ngola Mussuri or Bumbambula, to be a blacksmith who came there from Kongo, and was elected king (Ngola) due to his benevolence.

To its east around Lake Mai-Ndombe, there emerged Mwene Muji, likely around 1400. Their 'empire' status is pending on further archaeological research. With a powerful riverine navy, they expanded along the Kasai, Lukenie, Kamtsha, Kwilu, and Wamba rivers, without venturing much into the interior, coming to dominate trade.

In the late 15th century, Kongo came into contact with the Portuguese. A Kongo delegation was invited to Lisbon in 1487, and relations were initially warm. A Portuguese priest mastered Kikongo and his input led to the baptism of Kongo's king and royal court. At the same time commercial relations developed. Trade in slaves was the most lucrative.

By the 16th century, the manikongo held authority from the Atlantic in the west to the Kwango River in the east. Each territory was assigned a mani-mpembe (provincial governor) by the manikongo. In 1506, Afonso I (1506–1542), a Christian, took over the throne. Slave trading increased with Afonso's wars of conquest. About 1568 to 1569, the Jaga invaded Kongo, laying waste to the kingdom and forcing the manikongo into exile. In 1574, Manikongo Álvaro I was reinstated with the help of Portuguese mercenaries. During the latter part of the 1660s, the Portuguese tried to gain control of Kongo. Manikongo António I (1661–1665), with a Kongolese army of 5,000, was destroyed by an army of Afro-Portuguese at the Battle of Mbwila. The empire dissolved into petty polities, fighting among each other for war captives to sell into slavery.

Kongo gained captives from the Kingdom of Ndongo in wars of conquest. Ndongo was ruled by the ngola. Ndongo would also engage in slave trading with the Portuguese, with São Tomé being a transit point to Brazil. The kingdom was not as welcoming as Kongo; it viewed the Portuguese with great suspicion and as an enemy. The Portuguese in the latter part of the 16th century tried to gain control of Ndongo but were defeated by the Mbundu. Ndongo experienced depopulation from slave raiding. The leaders established another state at Matamba, affiliated with Queen Nzinga, who put up a strong resistance to the Portuguese until coming to terms with them. The Portuguese settled along the coast as trade dealers, not venturing on conquest of the interior. Slavery wreaked havoc in the interior, with states initiating wars of conquest for captives. The Imbangala formed the slave-raiding state of Kasanje, a major source of slaves during the 17th and 18th centuries.

== Horn of Africa ==
=== Somalia ===
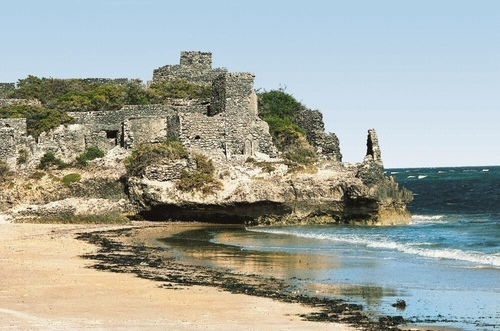
The Citadel of Gondershe, Somalia was an important city in the medieval Somali Ajuran Empire

The birth of Islam opposite Somalia's Red Sea coast meant that Somali merchants and sailors living on the Arabian Peninsula gradually came under the influence of the new religion through their converted Arab Muslim trading partners. With the migration of Muslim families from the Islamic world to Somalia in the early centuries of Islam, and the peaceful conversion of the Somali population by Somali Muslim scholars in the following centuries, the ancient city-states eventually transformed into Islamic Mogadishu, Berbera, Zeila, Barawa and Merka, which were part of the Barbar (the medieval Arab term for the ancestors of the modern Somalis) civilization. The city of Mogadishu came to be known as the City of Islam and controlled the East African gold trade for several centuries.

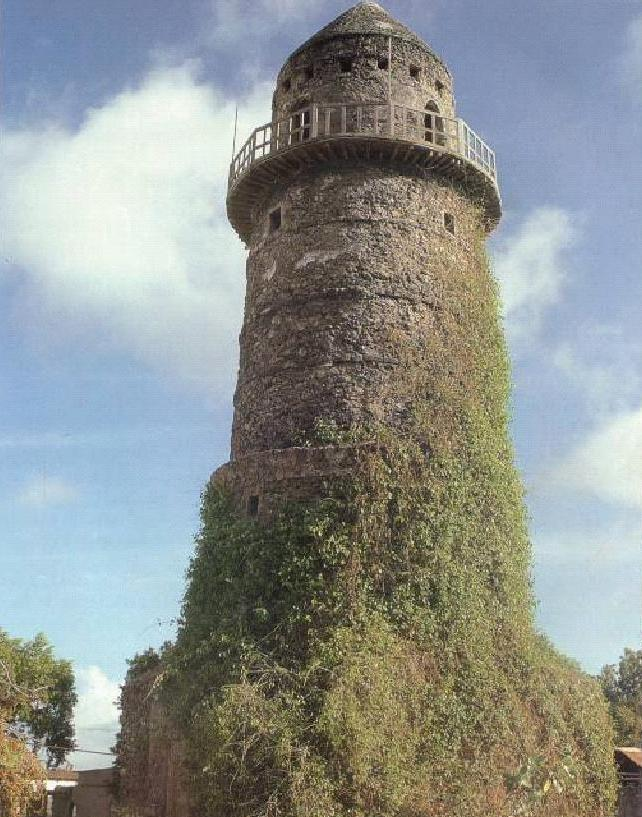
Almnara Tower, Mogadishu.

During this period, sultanates such as the Ajuran Empire and the Sultanate of Mogadishu, and republics like Barawa, Merca and Hobyo and their respective ports flourished and had a lucrative foreign commerce with ships sailing to and coming from Arabia, India, Venice, Persia, Egypt, Portugal and as far away as China. Vasco da Gama, who passed by Mogadishu in the 15th century, noted that it was a large city with houses four or five stories high and big palaces in its centre, in addition to many mosques with cylindrical minarets.

In the 16th century, Duarte Barbosa noted that many ships from the Kingdom of Cambaya in modern-day India sailed to Mogadishu with cloth and spices, for which they in return received gold, wax, and ivory. Barbosa also highlighted the abundance of meat, wheat, barley, horses, and fruit in the coastal markets, which generated enormous wealth for the merchants. Mogadishu, the center of a thriving weaving industry known as toob benadir (specialized for the markets in Egypt and Syria), together with Merca and Barawa, served as a transit stop for Swahili merchants from Mombasa and Malindi and for the gold trade from Kilwa. Jewish merchants from the Strait of Hormuz brought their Indian textiles and fruit to the Somali coast to exchange for grain and wood.

Trading relations were established with Malacca in the 15th century, with cloth, ambergris, and porcelain being the main commodities of the trade. Giraffes, zebras, and incense were exported to the Ming Empire of China, which established Somali merchants as leaders in the commerce between Asia and Africa and influenced the Chinese language with borrowings from the Somali language in the process. Hindu merchants from Surat and southeast African merchants from Pate, seeking to bypass both the Portuguese blockade and Omani meddling, used the Somali ports of Merca and Barawa (which were out of the two powers' jurisdiction) to conduct their trade in safety and without any problems.

=== Ethiopia ===
The Zagwe dynasty ruled many parts of modern Ethiopia and Eritrea from approximately 1137 to 1270. The name of the dynasty comes from the Cushitic speaking Agaw of northern Ethiopia. From 1270 AD and on for many centuries, the Solomonic dynasty ruled the Ethiopian Empire.

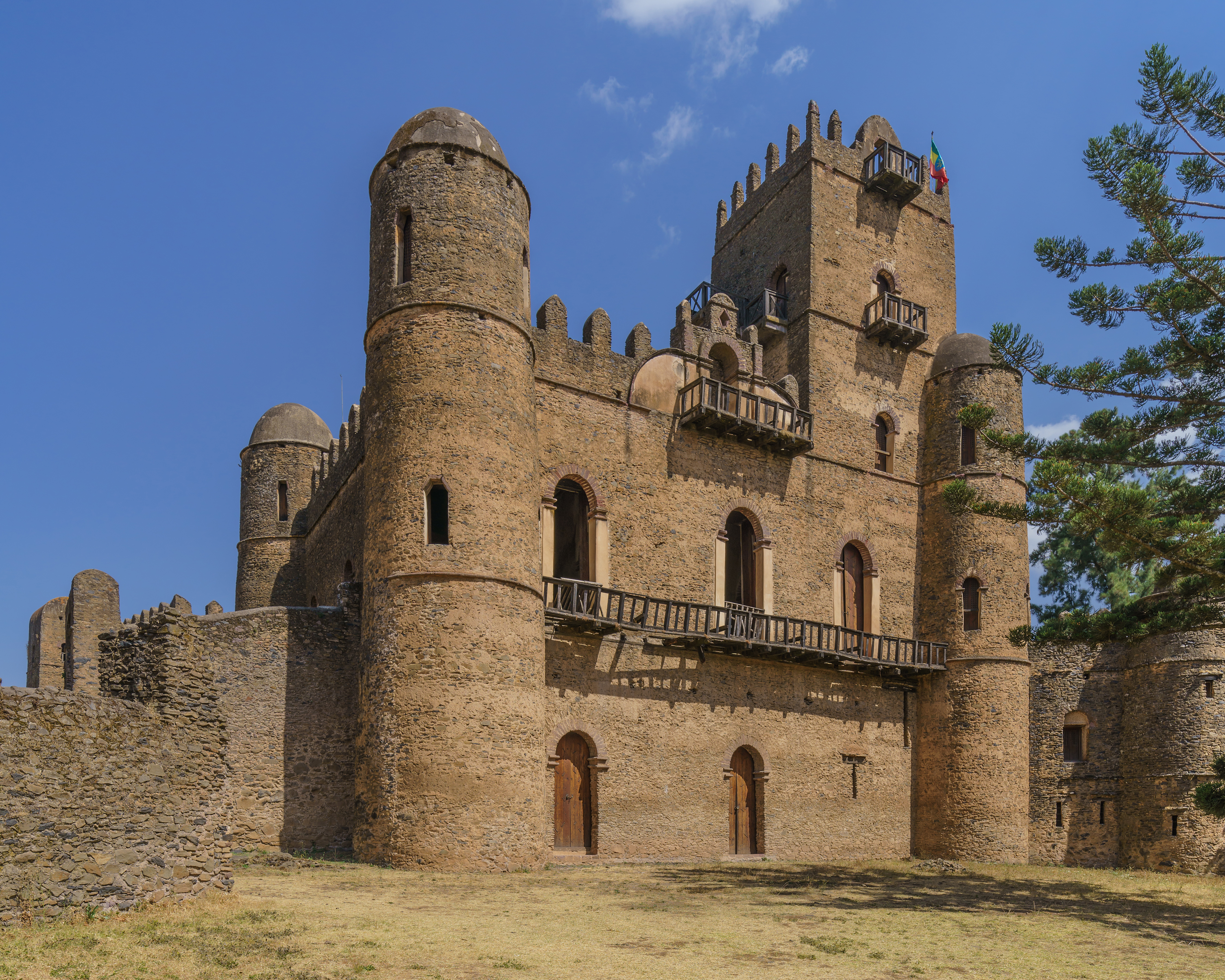
King Fasilides's Castle

In the early 15th century Ethiopia sought to make diplomatic contact with European kingdoms for the first time since Aksumite times. A letter from King Henry IV of England to the Emperor of Abyssinia survives. In 1428, the Emperor Yeshaq I sent two emissaries to Alfonso V of Aragon, who sent return emissaries who failed to complete the return trip.

The first continuous relations with a European country began in 1508 with the Kingdom of Portugal under Emperor Lebna Dengel, who had just inherited the throne from his father. This proved to be an important development, for when the empire was subjected to the attacks of the Adal general and imam, Ahmad ibn Ibrahim al-Ghazi (called "Grañ", or "the Left-handed"), Portugal assisted the Ethiopian emperor by sending weapons and four hundred men, who helped his son Gelawdewos defeat Ahmad and re-establish his rule. This Abyssinian–Adal War was also one of the first proxy wars in the region as the Ottoman Empire, and Portugal took opposing sides in the conflict.

When Emperor Susenyos converted to Roman Catholicism in 1624, years of revolt and civil unrest followed resulting in thousands of deaths. The Jesuit missionaries had offended the Orthodox faith of the local Ethiopians, and on June 25, 1632, Susenyos's son, Emperor Fasilides, declared the state religion to again be Ethiopian Orthodox Christianity and expelled the Jesuit missionaries and other Europeans.

== North Africa ==
=== Maghreb ===
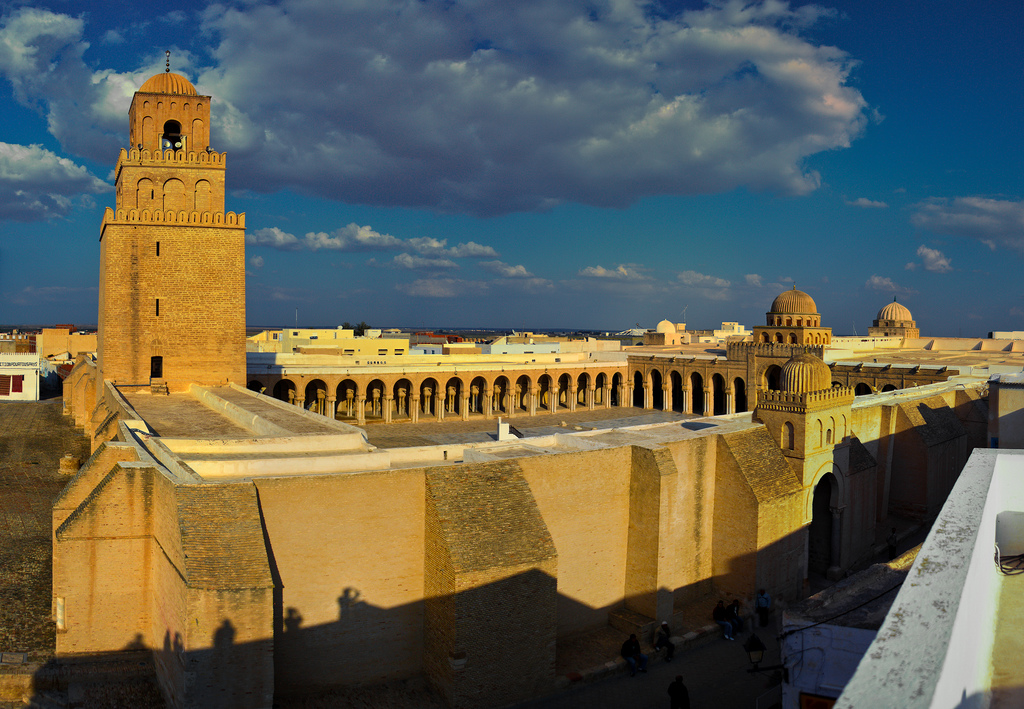
The Great Mosque of Kairouan (also known as the Mosque of Uqba), first built in 670 by the Umayyad general Uqba Ibn Nafi, is the oldest and most prestigious mosque in the Maghreb and North Africa, located in the city of Kairouan, Tunisia

By 711 AD, the Umayyad Caliphate had conquered all of North Africa. By the 10th century, the majority of the population of North Africa was Muslim.

By the 9th century AD, the unity brought about by the Islamic conquest of North Africa and the expansion of Islamic culture came to an end. Conflict arose as to who should be the successor of the prophet. The Umayyads had initially taken control of the Caliphate, with their capital at Damascus. Later, the Abbasids had taken control, moving the capital to Baghdad. The Berber people, being independent in spirit and hostile to outside interference in their affairs and to Arab exclusivity in orthodox Islam, adopted Shi'ite and Kharijite Islam, both considered unorthodox and hostile to the authority of the Abbasid Caliphate. Numerous Kharijite kingdoms came and fell during the 8th and 9th centuries, asserting their independence from Baghdad. In the early 10th century, Shi'ite groups from Syria, claiming descent from Muhammad's daughter Fatimah, founded the Fatimid dynasty in the Maghreb. By 950, they had conquered all of the Maghreb and by 969 all of Egypt. They had immediately broken away from Baghdad.

In an attempt to bring about a purer form of Islam among the Sanhaja Berbers, Abdallah ibn Yasin founded the Almoravid movement in present-day Mauritania and Western Sahara. The Sanhaja Berbers, like the Soninke, practiced an indigenous religion alongside Islam. Abdallah ibn Yasin found ready converts in the Lamtuna Sanhaja, who were dominated by the Soninke in the south and the Zenata Berbers in the north. By the 1040s, all of the Lamtuna was converted to the Almoravid movement. With the help of Yahya ibn Umar and his brother Abu Bakr ibn Umar, the sons of the Lamtuna chief, the Almoravids created an empire extending from the Sahel to the Mediterranean. After the death of Abdallah ibn Yassin and Yahya ibn Umar, Abu Bakr split the empire in half, between himself and Yusuf ibn Tashfin, because it was too big to be ruled by one individual. Abu Bakr took the south to continue fighting the Soninke, and Yusuf ibn Tashfin took the north, expanding it to southern Spain. The death of Abu Bakr in 1087 saw a breakdown of unity and increase military dissension in the south. This caused a re-expansion of the Soninke. The Almoravids were once held responsible for bringing down the Ghana Empire in 1076, but this view is no longer credited.

During the 10th through 13th centuries, there was a large-scale movement of bedouins out of the Arabian Peninsula. About 1050, a quarter of a million Arab nomads from Egypt moved into the Maghreb. Those following the northern coast were referred to as Banu Hilal. Those going south of the Atlas Mountains were the Banu Sulaym. This movement spread the use of the Arabic language and hastened the decline of the Berber language and the Arabisation of North Africa. Later an Arabised Berber group, the Hawwara, went south to Nubia via Egypt.

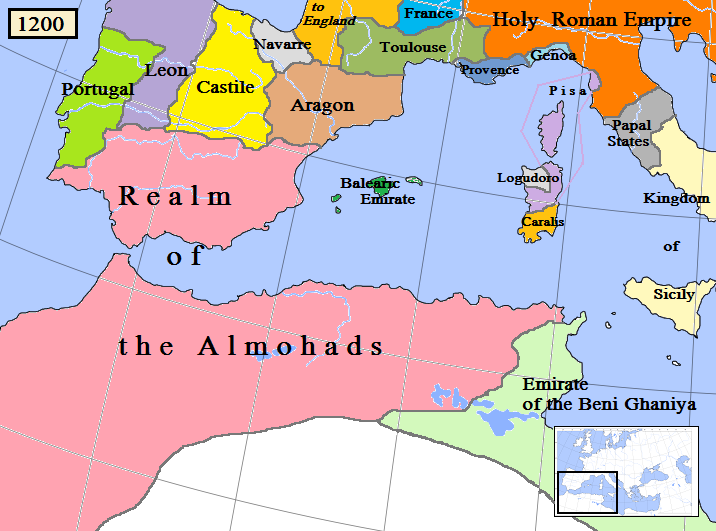
Almohad Empire, c. 1200

In the 1140s, Abd al-Mu'min declared jihad on the Almoravids, charging them with decadence and corruption. He united the northern Berbers against the Almoravids, overthrowing them and forming the Almohad Empire. During this period, the Maghreb became thoroughly Islamised and saw the spread of literacy, the development of algebra, and the use of the number zero and decimals. By the 13th century, the Almohad states had split into three rival states. Muslim states were largely extinguished in the Iberian Peninsula by the Christian kingdoms of Castile, Aragon, and Portugal. Around 1415, Portugal engaged in a reconquista of North Africa by capturing Ceuta, and in later centuries Spain and Portugal acquired other ports on the North African coast. In 1492, at the end of the Granada War, Spain defeated Muslims in the Emirate of Granada, effectively ending eight centuries of Muslim domination in southern Iberia.

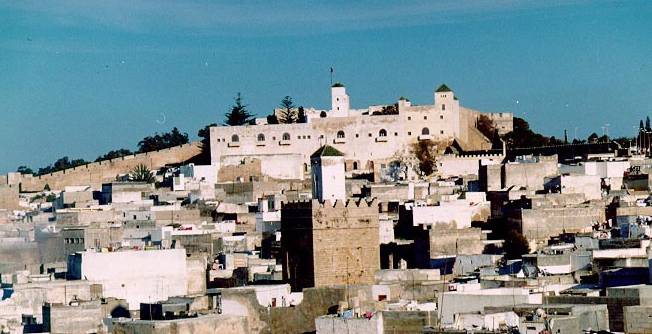
The Almohad minaret in Safi

Portugal and Spain took the ports of Tangiers, Algiers, Tripoli, and Tunis. This put them in direct competition with the Ottoman Empire, which re-took the ports using Turkish corsairs (pirates and privateers). The Turkish corsairs would use the ports for raiding Christian ships, a major source of booty for the towns. Technically, North Africa was under the control of the Ottoman Empire, but only the coastal towns were fully under Istanbul's control. Tripoli benefited from trade with Borno. The pashas of Tripoli traded horses, firearms, and armor via Fez with the sultans of the Bornu Empire for slaves.

In the 16th century, an Arab nomad tribe that claimed descent from Muhammad's daughter, the Saadis, conquered and united Morocco. They prevented the Ottoman Empire from reaching to the Atlantic and expelled Portugal from Morocco's western coast. Ahmad al-Mansur brought the state to the height of its power. He invaded Songhay in 1591, to control the gold trade, which had been diverted to the western coast of Africa for European ships and to the east, to Tunis. Morocco's hold on Songhay diminished in the 17th century. In 1603, after Ahmad's death, the kingdom split into the two sultanates of Fes and Marrakesh. Later it was reunited by Moulay al-Rashid, founder of the Alaouite dynasty (1672–1727). His brother and successor, Ismail ibn Sharif (1672–1727), strengthened the unity of the country by importing slaves from the Sudan to build up the military.

=== Nile Valley ===
==== Egypt ====
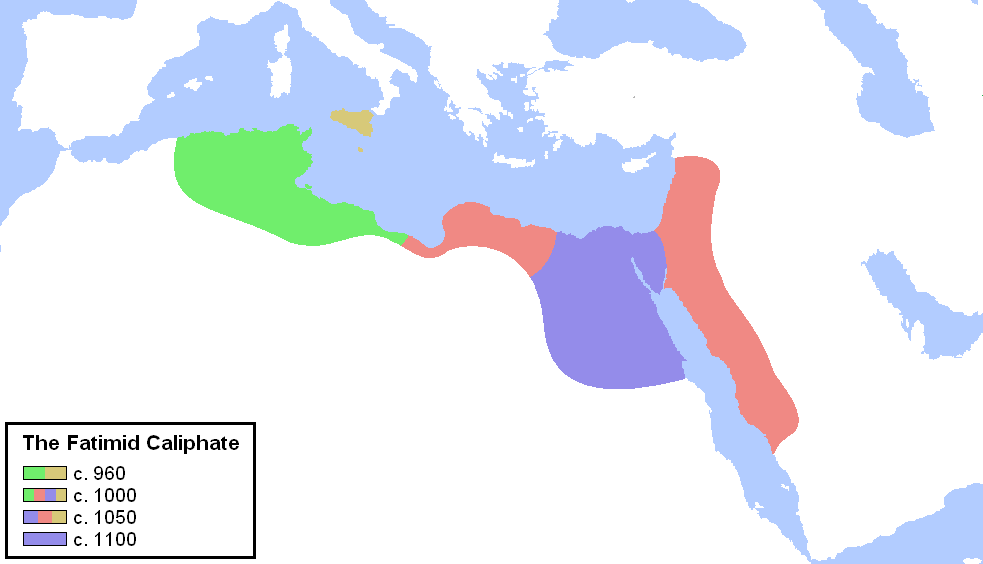
Fatimid Caliphate

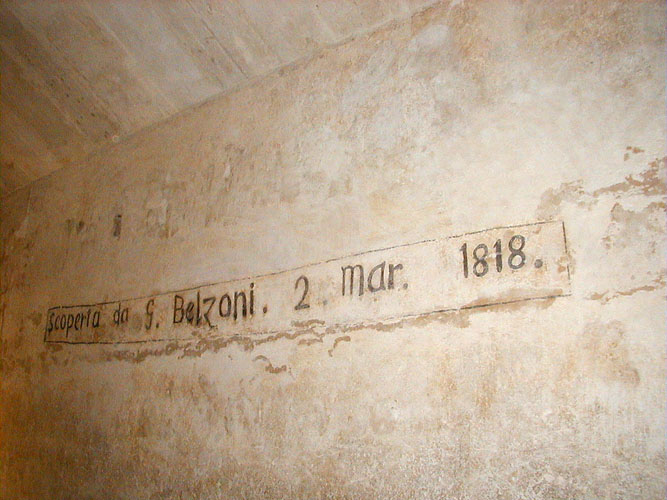
Inscription by Italian explorer Giovanni Belzoni inside the Pyramid of Khafre

In 642 AD, the Rashidun Caliphate conquered Byzantine Egypt.

Egypt under the Fatimid Caliphate was prosperous. Dams and canals were repaired, and wheat, barley, flax, and cotton production increased. Egypt became a major producer of linen and cotton cloth. Its Mediterranean and Red Sea trade increased. Egypt also minted a gold currency called the Fatimid dinar, which was used for international trade. The bulk of revenues came from taxing the fellahin (peasant farmers), and taxes were high. Tax collecting was leased to Berber overlords, who were soldiers who had taken part in the Fatimid conquest in 969 AD. The overlords paid a share to the caliphs and retained what was left. Eventually, they became landlords and constituted a settled land aristocracy.

To fill the military ranks, Mamluk Turkish slave cavalry and Sudanese slave infantry were used. Berber freemen were also recruited. In the 1150s, tax revenues from farms diminished. The soldiers revolted and wreaked havoc in the countryside, slowed trade, and diminished the power and authority of the Fatimid caliphs.

During the 1160s, Fatimid Egypt came under threat from European crusaders. Out of this threat, a Kurdish general named Ṣalāḥ ad-Dīn Yūsuf ibn Ayyūb (Saladin), with a small band of professional soldiers, emerged as an outstanding Muslim defender. Saladin defeated the Christian crusaders at Egypt's borders and recaptured Jerusalem in 1187. On the death of Al-Adid, the last Fatimid caliph, in 1171, Saladin became the ruler of Egypt, ushering in the Ayyubid dynasty. Under his rule, Egypt returned to Sunni Islam, Cairo became an important center of Arab Islamic learning, and Mamluk slaves were increasingly recruited from Turkey and southern Russia for military service. Support for the military was tied to the iqta, a form of land taxation in which soldiers were given ownership in return for military service.

Over time, Mamluk slave soldiers became a very powerful landed aristocracy, to the point of getting rid of the Ayyubid dynasty in 1250 and establishing a Mamluk dynasty. The more powerful Mamluks were referred to as amirs. For 250 years, Mamluks controlled all of Egypt under a military dictatorship. Egypt extended her territories to Syria and Palestine, thwarted the crusaders, and halted a Mongol invasion in 1260 at the Battle of Ain Jalut. Mamluk Egypt came to be viewed as a protector of Islam, and of Medina and Mecca. Eventually the iqta system declined and proved unreliable for providing an adequate military. The Mamluks started viewing their iqta as hereditary and became attuned to urban living. Farm production declined, and dams and canals lapsed into disrepair. Mamluk military skill and technology did not keep pace with new technology of handguns and cannons.

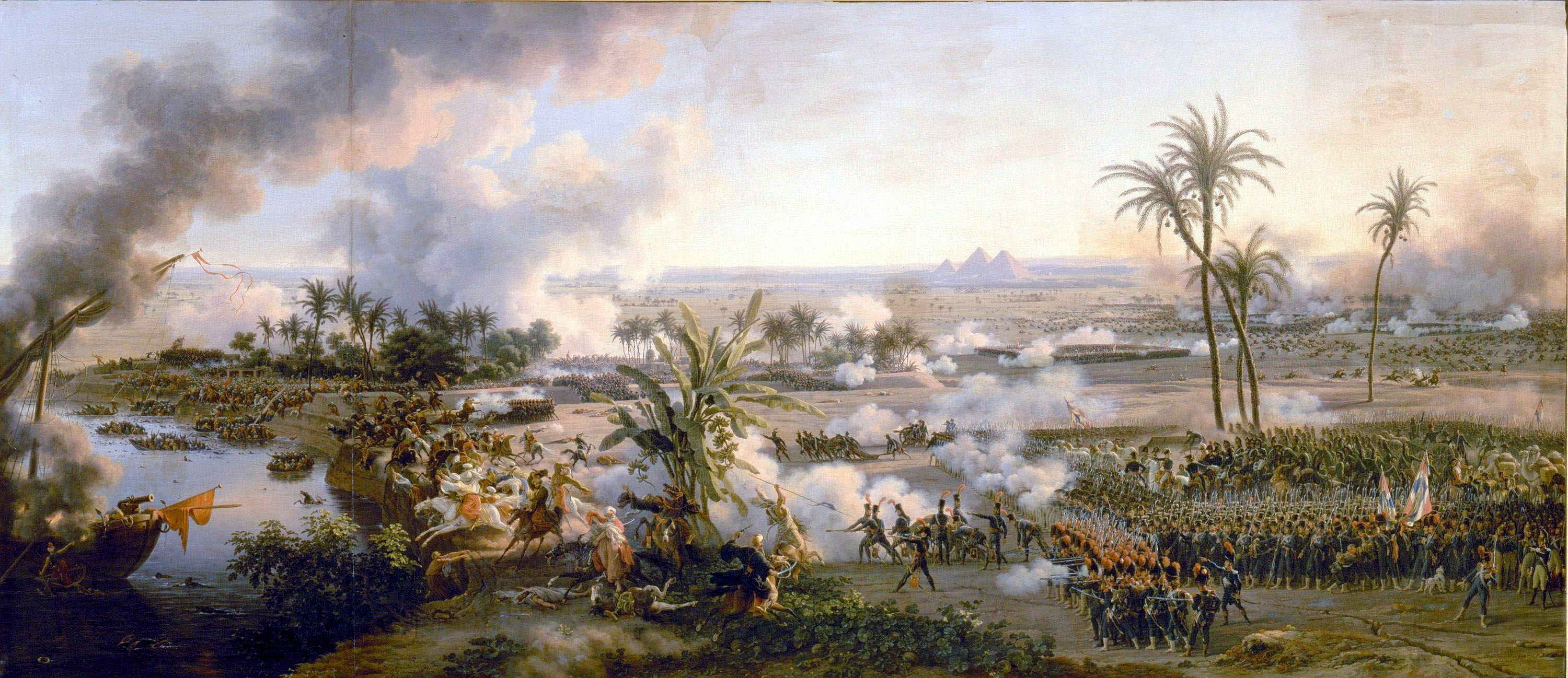
In July 1798, French forces under Napoleon annihilated an Egyptian army at the Battle of the Pyramids.

With the rise of the Ottoman Empire, Egypt was easily defeated. In 1517, at the end of an Ottoman–Mamluk War, Egypt became part of the Ottoman Empire. The Istanbul government revived the iqta system. Trade was reestablished in the Red Sea, but it could not completely connect with the Indian Ocean trade because of growing Portuguese presence. During the 17th and 18th centuries, hereditary Mamluks regained power. The leading Mamluks were referred to as beys. Pashas, or viceroys, represented the Istanbul government in name only, operating independently. During the 18th century, dynasties of pashas became established. The government was weak and corrupt.

In 1798, Napoleon invaded Egypt. The local forces had little ability to resist the French conquest. However, the British Empire and the Ottoman Empire were able to remove French occupation in 1801. These events marked the beginning of a 19th-century Anglo-Franco rivalry over Egypt.

=== Christian and Islamic Nubia ===
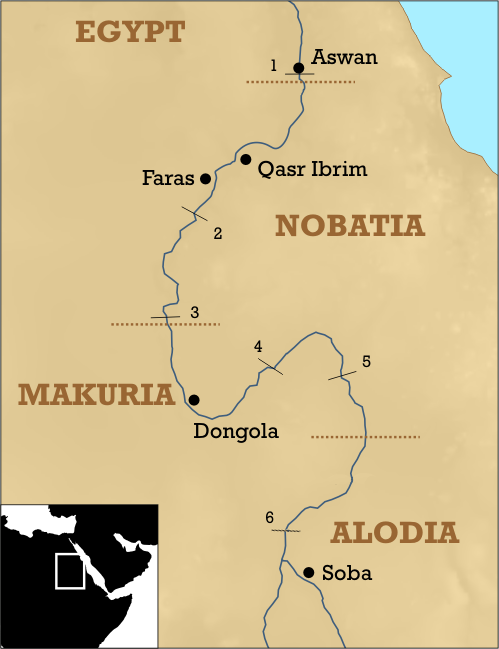
Christian Nubia and the Nile cataracts

After Ezana of Aksum sacked Meroe, people associated with the site of Ballana moved into Nubia from the southwest and founded three kingdoms: Makuria, Nobatia, and Alodia. They would rule for 200 years. Makuria was above the third cataract, along the Dongola Reach with its capital at Dongola. Nobadia was to the north with its capital at Faras, and Alodia was to the south with its capital at Soba. Makuria eventually absorbed Nobadia. The people of the region converted to Monophysite Christianity around 500 to 600 CE. The church initially started writing in Coptic, then in Greek, and finally in Old Nubian, a Nilo-Saharan language. The church was aligned with the Egyptian Coptic Church.

By 641, Egypt was conquered by the Rashidun Caliphate. This effectively blocked Christian Nubia and Aksum from Mediterranean Christendom. In 651–652, Arabs from Egypt invaded Christian Nubia. Nubian archers soundly defeated the invaders. The Baqt (or Bakt) Treaty was drawn, recognizing Christian Nubia and regulating trade. The treaty controlled relations between Christian Nubia and Islamic Egypt for almost six hundred years.

By the 13th century, Christian Nubia began its decline. The authority of the monarchy was diminished by the church and nobility. Arab bedouin tribes began to infiltrate Nubia, causing further havoc. Fakirs (holy men) practicing Sufism introduced Islam into Nubia. By 1366, Nubia had become divided into petty fiefdoms when it was invaded by Mamluks. During the 15th century, Nubia was open to Arab immigration. Arab nomads intermingled with the population and introduced the Arab culture and the Arabic language. By the 16th century, Makuria and Nobadia had been Islamized. During the 16th century, Abdallah Jamma headed an Arab confederation that destroyed Soba, capital of Alodia, the last holdout of Christian Nubia. Later Alodia would fall under the Funj Sultanate.

During the 15th century, Funj herders migrated north to Alodia and occupied it. Between 1504 and 1505, the kingdom expanded, reaching its peak and establishing its capital at Sennar under Badi II Abu Daqn (c. 1644 – 1680). By the end of the 16th century, the Funj had converted to Islam. They pushed their empire westward to Kordofan. They expanded eastward, but were halted by Ethiopia. They controlled Nubia down to the 3rd Cataract. The economy depended on captured enemies to fill the army and on merchants travelling through Sennar. Under Badi IV (1724–1762), the army turned on the king, making him nothing but a figurehead. In 1821, the Funj were conquered by Muhammad Ali (1805–1849), Pasha of Egypt.

== Southern Africa ==
Settlements of Bantu-speaking peoples who were iron-using agriculturists and herdsmen were long already well established south of the Limpopo River by the 4th century CE, displacing and absorbing the original Khoisan speakers. They slowly moved south, and the earliest ironworks in modern-day KwaZulu-Natal Province are believed to date from around 1050. The southernmost group was the Xhosa people, whose language incorporates certain linguistic traits from the earlier Khoi-San people, reaching the Great Fish River in today's Eastern Cape Province.

=== Great Zimbabwe and Mapungubwe ===
==== c. 700–c. 1250 ====
By the 4th century, Bantu peoples had established farming villages south of the Zambezi River. The San, having inhabited the region for around 100,000 years, (Note: Some scholars contest that cultures and identities can't be considered fixed or invariable, especially over such a long time period.) were driven off their ancestral lands or incorporated by Bantu speaking groups. The Zambezi Plateau came to be dotted with the agricultural chiefdoms of the Zhizo people and Leopard's Kopje people, in which cattle was the primary identifier of wealth. External trade began around the 7th century, primarily exporting gold and ivory. Around 900, motivated by the ivory trade, some Zhizo moved south to settle the Limpopo-Shashe Basin. Their capital and most populated settlement was Schroda, and via the coastal Swahili city-state Chibuene they engaged in the Indian Ocean trade.

The 10th century saw increased global demand for gold as various Muslim, European, and Indian states began issuing gold coinage. Around 1000, some Leopard's Kopje people moved south to settle Bambandyanalo (known as K2), as the Zhizo moved west to settle Toutswe in modern-day Botswana. Some scholars believe their relations to have been hostile, however others insist they were more complex, both socially and politically. The San, who were believed to have closer connections to the old spirits of the land, were often turned to by other societies for rainmaking. The community at K2 chose the San rather than the Zhizo, their political rivals, because the San did not believe in ancestors, and by not acknowledging the Zhizo's ancestors they would not be held to ransom by them.

Northwest, the community at Mapela Hill had possibly developed sacral kingship by the 11th century. To the east, an early settlement was Gumanye. Great Zimbabwe was founded around 1000 AD, and construction on the city's iconic dry-stone walls began in the 11th century. From the 12th century Great Zimbabwe wrestled with other settlements, such as Chivowa, for economic and political dominance in the Southern Zambezi Escarpment. Further south by 1200, K2 had a population of 1500. The large wealth generated by the Indian Ocean trade created unprecedented inequalities, evolving over time from a society based on social ranking to one based on social classes. K2's spatial arrangement became unsuited to this development.

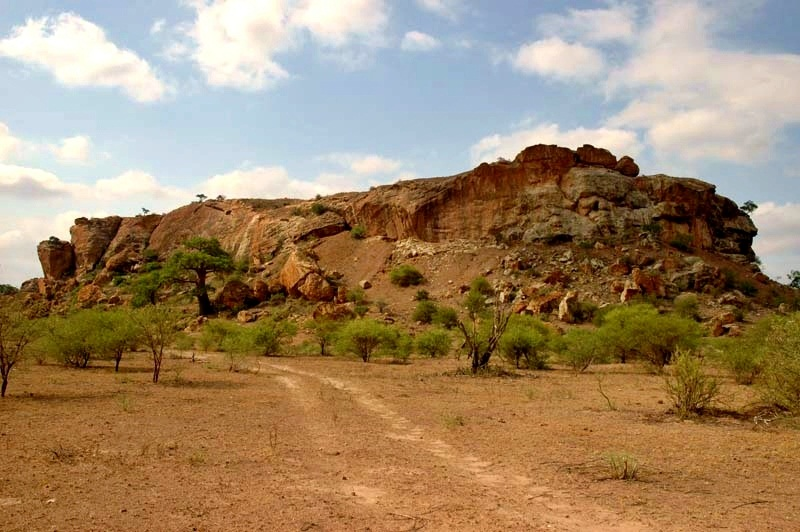
Mapungubwe Hill, which features some ancient San art in a rock shelter on the east side.

Amid a harsh drought which likely troubled the society, royal elites moved the capital to Mapungubwe Hill and settled its flat-topped summit around 1220, while most people settled below, surrounding the sacred leader in a protective circle. Mapungubwe Hill became the sole rainmaking hill, and its habitation by the leader emphasised a link between himself and rainmaking, which was substantial in the development of sacral kingship. The first king had their palace on the western part of the hill, and is called "Shiriyadenga" in Venda oral traditions. His entourage included soldiers and praise singers, along with musicians who played mbiras and xylophones. The state likely covered 30,000 km^{2} (12,000 square miles). They traded locally with Toutswe and Eiland among others. High global demand saw gold and ivory exported to the Indian Ocean trade via Sofala. It is unclear to what extent coercion and conflict played in Mapungubwe's growth and dominance due to this being challenging to recognise archaeologically, however the stone walls likely served a defensive purpose, indicating warfare was conventional.

==== c. 1250–1500 ====
By 1250, Mapungubwe had a population of 5000, and produced textiles and ceramics. The centre of the settlement was the domain of men, and had an area for resolving disputes and making political decisions, while the outer zone was the domain of women, containing domestic complexes. The second king had their palace in the middle of the hill, and is called "Tshidziwelele" in Venda oral traditions. The king had many wives, with some living outside of the capital to help maintain the network of alliances. The economy was based on agriculture, and to make more productive use of the land, cattle (previously held as the primary identifier of wealth) were herded away from the capital and permitted to graze on other communities' land, forming social and political ties and increasing Mapungubwe's influence. A large amount of wealth was accumulated via tributes, which were paid in crops, animals, and sometimes rarer goods.

Meanwhile, at Great Zimbabwe agriculture and cattle played a key role in developing a vital social network, and served to "enfranchise management of goods and services distributed as benefits within traditional political and social institutions", while long-distance trade was crucial for the transformation of localised organisations into regional ones. This process rapidly advanced during the 13th century, which saw large dry masonry stone walls raised, and by 1250 Great Zimbabwe had become an important trade centre.

The events around Mapungubwe's collapse are unknown. (Note: It has previously been attributed to drastic climatic change amid the Little Ice Age, however this has since been disproven.) It is plausible confidence was lost in the leadership amid the deepening material and spiritual divide between commoners and the king, and a breakdown in common purpose, provoking people to "vote with their feet". By 1300, trade routes had shifted north as merchants bypassed the Limpopo and Mapungubwe by travelling the Save River into the gold-producing interior, precipitating Mapungubwe's rapid decline and the dominance of Great Zimbabwe. Mapungubwe was abandoned as people scattered northwest and south. They didn't regroup.

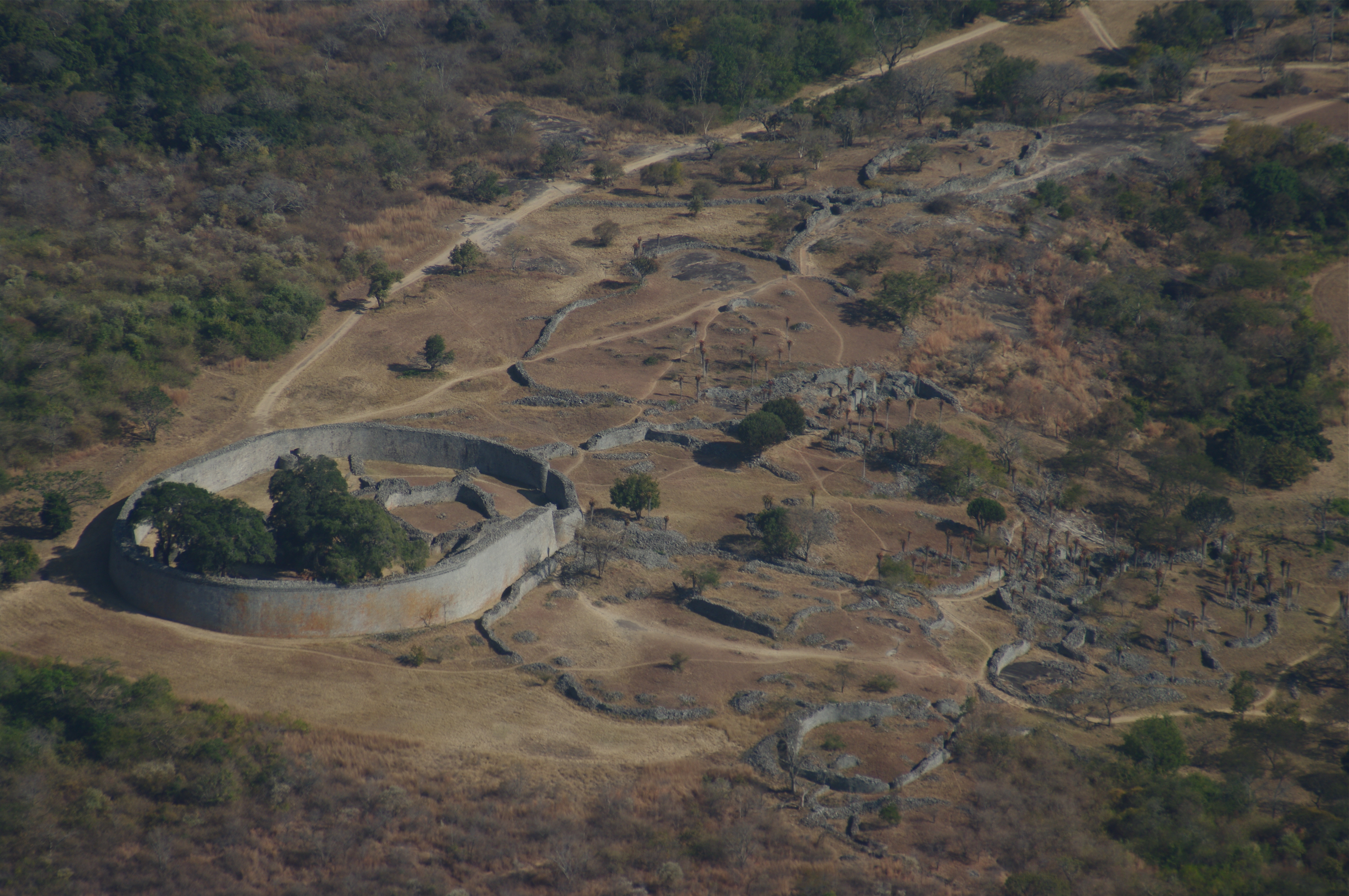
Aerial view of the Great Enclosure and Valley Complex at Great Zimbabwe, looking west

Great Zimbabwe's wealth was derived from cattle rearing, agriculture, and the domination of trade routes from the goldfields of the Zimbabwean Plateau to the Swahili coast. The kingdom taxed other rulers throughout the region and was composed of over 150 smaller zimbabwes, and likely covered 50,000 km^{2}. The large cattle herd that supplied the city moved seasonally and was managed by the court, and salt, cattle, grain, and copper were traded as far north as the Kundelungu Plateau in present-day DR Congo. At Great Zimbabwe's centre was the Great Enclosure which housed royalty and had demarcated spaces for rituals. Commoners' homes were built out of mud on wooden frame structures, and within the second perimeter wall they surrounded the royalty. The institutionalisation of Great Zimbabwe's politico-religious ideology served to legitimise the position of the king (mambo), with a link between leaders, their ancestors, and God. The community incorporated dhaka pits into a complex water management system.

As with Mapungubwe, it is unclear to what extent coercion and conflict facilitated Great Zimbabwe's dominance. While the Great Enclosure served to display prestige and status, and to reinforce inequalities between elites and commoners, it likely also served to deter contestation for political power amid the close linkage between wealth accumulation and political authority, with rivals for power, such as district chiefs and regional governors, located outside the settlement in prestige enclosures. The perimeter walls also likely served a defensive purpose, indicating warfare was conventional.

Map of trade centres and routes on the Zimbabwean Plateau

It is unclear what caused Great Zimbabwe's decline. Shona oral tradition attributes Great Zimbabwe's demise to a salt shortage, which may be a figurative way of speaking of land depletion for agriculturalists or of the depletion of critical resources for the community. It is plausible the aquifer Great Zimbabwe sat on top of ran out of water, or the growing population contaminated the water. From the early 15th century, international trade began to decline amid a global economic downturn, reducing demand for gold, which adversely affected Great Zimbabwe. In response to this, elites expanded regional trading networks, resulting in greater prosperity for other settlements in the region.

By the late 15th century, the consequences of this decision began to manifest, as offshoots from Great Zimbabwe's royal family formed new dynasties, possibly as a result of losing succession disputes. According to oral tradition, Nyatsimba Mutota, a member of Great Zimbabwe's royal family, led part of the population north in search for salt to found the Mutapa Empire. (Note: According to tradition, the move came about because the king was tired of eating salt made from goat's dung.) It was believed that only their most recent ancestors would follow them, with older ancestors staying at Great Zimbabwe and providing protection there. Mutota is said to have found salt in the lands of the Tavara, and settled around the Ruya-Mazowe Basin, conquering and incorporating the pre-existing chiefdoms to control agricultural production and strategic resources. This placed the state at a key position in the gold and ivory trade. Angoche traders opened a new route along the Zambezi via Mutapa and Ingombe Ilede to reach the goldfields west of Great Zimbabwe, precipitating its decline and the rise of Khami (previously a Leopard's Kopje's chiefdom located close to the goldfields), the capital of the Kingdom of Butua. Butua's first mambo was Madabhale of the Torwa dynasty, who had the praise name Chibundule (meaning "sounding of the war horn"). (Note: Kalanga oral traditions collected in 1922 compress the history of the Torwa dynasty into that of one ruler called Chibundule, such that the story of Chibundule represents that of Butua. In a praise poem, Chibundule is said to have given refuge to the elephant (the totem of the Mutapa dynasty) and the rhinoceros (possibly the totem of Mapungubwe's dynasty due to the Golden Rhinoceros of Mapungubwe).)

In Mutapa, Mutota's son and successor, Nyanhewe Matope, moved the capital to Mount Fura and extended this new kingdom into an empire encompassing most of the lands between Tavara and the Indian Ocean. Matope's armies overran the Manyika and Tonga as well as the coastal Teve and Madanda. Meanwhile, Butua rapidly grew in size and wealth, and came to border the Mutapa Empire along the Sanyati River. (Note: Portuguese records from 1520 state that Butua was a vassal of Mwenemutapa, however this is likely to have been falsified in order to portray Portuguese commercial dealings with Mutapa as more important than they were.) There appear to have intermarriages between the Nembire dynasty of Mutapa and the Torwa dynasty of Butua. According to oral traditions, Changamire was likely a descendant of both dynasties. He had been appointed governor (amir) of the southern portion of the Mutapa Empire (Guruhuswa). In 1490, Changamire I rebelled against the Mwenemutapa, his elder brother Nyahuma, and deposed him, reportedly with help from the Torwa. He ruled Mutapa for four years until he was killed by the rightful heir to the throne, reportedly his nephew. His son Changamire II continued the conflict, ruling the southern portion which broke away from the Mutapa Empire. Whether this breakaway state maintained independence or came back under the rule of the Mwenemutapa is unclear, as we don't hear of the Changamire dynasty again until the 17th century.

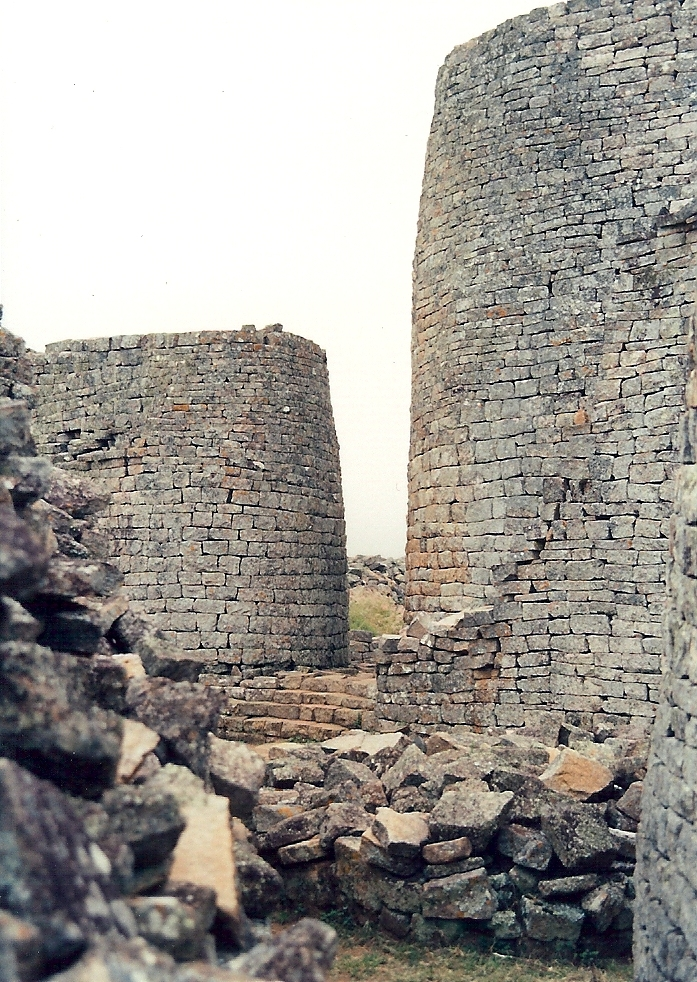
Towers of Great Zimbabwe.

=== Namibia ===
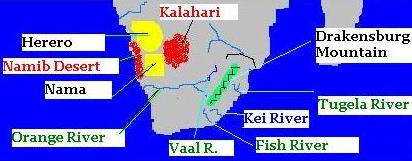
Herero and Nama territories

By 1500 AD, most of southern Africa had established states. In northwestern Namibia, the Ovambo engaged in farming and the Herero engaged in herding. As cattle numbers increased, the Herero moved southward to central Namibia for grazing land. A related group, the Ovambanderu, expanded to Ghanzi in northwestern Botswana. The Nama, a Khoi-speaking, sheep-raising group, moved northward and came into contact with the Herero; this would set the stage for much conflict between the two groups. The expanding Lozi states pushed the Mbukushu, Subiya, and Yei to Botei, Okavango, and Chobe in northern Botswana.

=== South Africa and Botswana ===
==== Sotho–Tswana ====
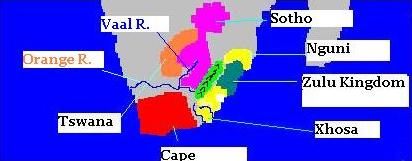
South African ethnic groups

The development of Sotho–Tswana states based on the highveld, south of the Limpopo River, began around 1000 CE. The chief's power rested on cattle and his connection to the ancestor. This can be seen in the Toutswemogala Hill settlements with stone foundations and stone walls, north of the highveld and south of the Vaal River. Northwest of the Vaal River developed early Tswana states centered on towns of thousands of people. When disagreements or rivalry arose, different groups moved to form their own states.

==== Nguni peoples ====
Southeast of the Drakensberg mountains lived Nguni-speaking peoples (Zulu, Xhosa, Swazi, and Ndebele). They too engaged in state building, with new states developing from rivalry, disagreements, and population pressure causing movement into new regions. This 19th-century process of warfare, state building and migration later became known as the Mfecane (Nguni) or Difaqane (Sotho). Its major catalyst was the consolidation of the Zulu Kingdom. They were metalworkers, cultivators of millet, and cattle herders.

==== Khoisan and Boers ====
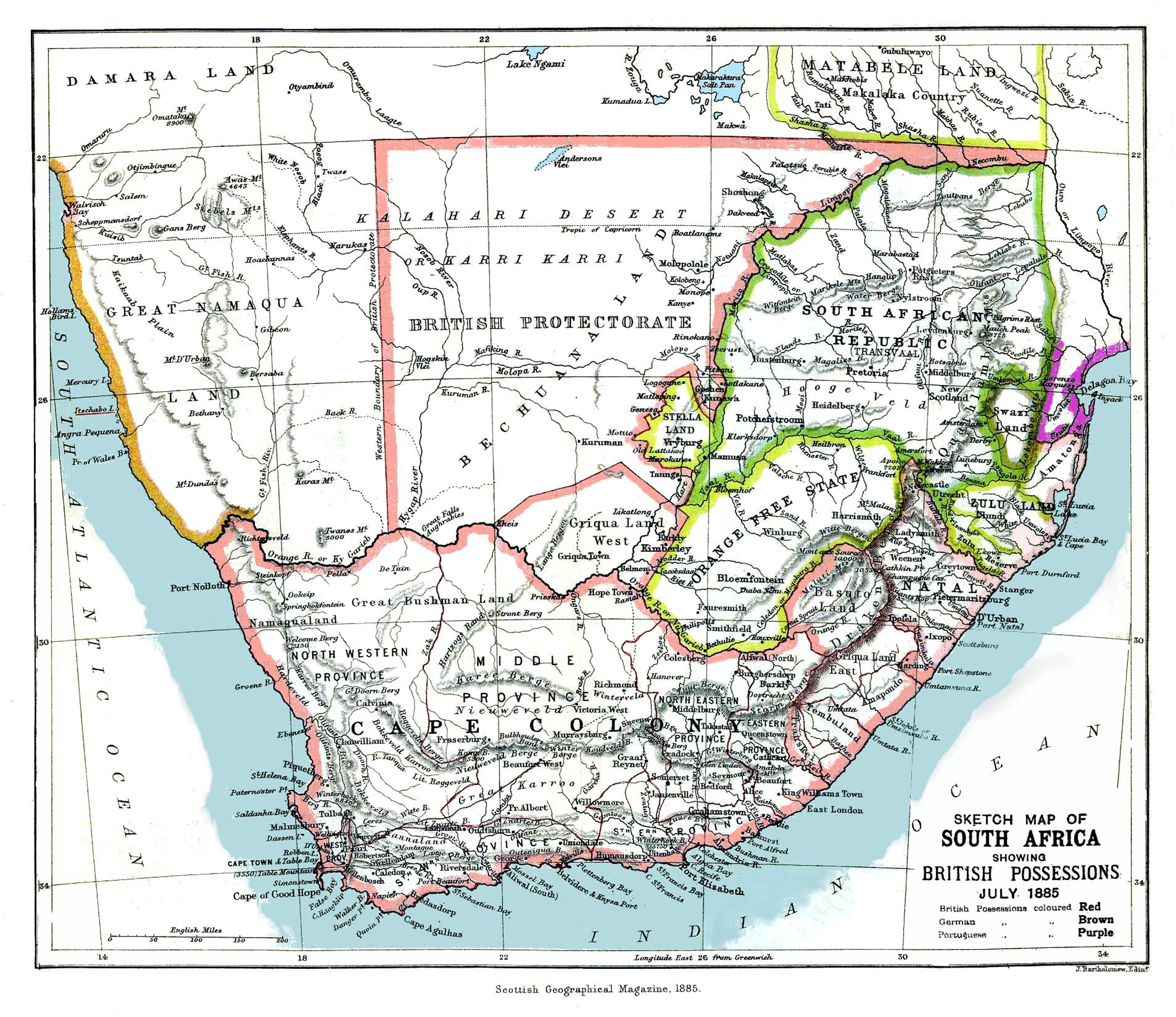
Political map of Southern Africa in 1885

The Khoisan lived in the southwestern Cape Province, where winter rainfall is plentiful. Earlier Khoisan populations were absorbed by Bantu peoples, such as the Sotho and Nguni, but the Bantu expansion stopped at the region with winter rainfall. Some Bantu languages have incorporated the click consonant of the Khoisan languages. The Khoisan traded with their Bantu neighbors, providing cattle, sheep, and hunted items. In return, their Bantu speaking neighbors traded copper, iron, and tobacco.

By the 16th century, the Dutch East India Company established a replenishing station at Table Bay for restocking water and purchasing meat from the Khoikhoi. The Khoikhoi received copper, iron, tobacco, and beads in exchange. In order to control the price of meat and stock and make service more consistent, the Dutch established a permanent settlement at Table Bay in 1652. They grew fresh fruit and vegetables and established a hospital for sick sailors. To increase produce, the Dutch decided to increase the number of farms at Table Bay by encouraging freeburgher boers (farmers) on lands worked initially by slaves from West Africa. The land was taken from Khoikhoi grazing land, triggering the first Khoikhoi-Dutch war in 1659. No victors emerged, but the Dutch assumed a "right of conquest" by which they claimed all of the cape. In a series of wars pitting the Khoikhoi against each other, the Boers assumed all Khoikhoi land and claimed all their cattle. The second Khoikoi-Dutch war (1673–1677) was a cattle raid. The Khoikhoi also died in thousands from European diseases.

By the 18th century, the cape colony had grown, with slaves coming from Madagascar, Mozambique, and Indonesia. The settlement also started to expand northward, but Khoikhoi resistance, raids, and guerrilla warfare slowed the expansion during the 18th century. Boers who started to practice pastoralism were known as trekboers. A common source of trekboer labor was orphan children who were captured during raids and whose parents had been killed.

== Southeast Africa ==
=== Prehistory ===
According to the theory of recent African origin of modern humans, the mainstream position held within the scientific community, all humans originate from either Southeast Africa or the Horn of Africa. During the first millennium CE, Nilotic and Bantu-speaking peoples moved into the region.

=== Swahili coast ===
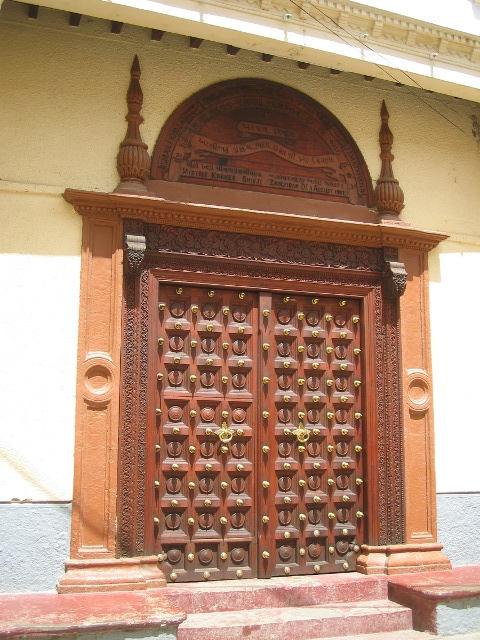
A traditional Zanzibari-style Swahili coast door in Zanzibar.

The turn of the 7th century saw the Swahili coast continue to be inhabited by the Swahili civilisation, whose economies were primarily based on agriculture, however they traded via the Indian Ocean trade and later developed local industries, with their iconic stone architecture. Forested river estuaries created natural harbours whilst the yearly monsoon winds assisted trade, and the Swahili civilisation consisted of hundreds of settlements and linked the societies and kingdoms of the interior, such as those of the Zambezi basin and the Great Lakes, to the wider Indian Ocean trade.

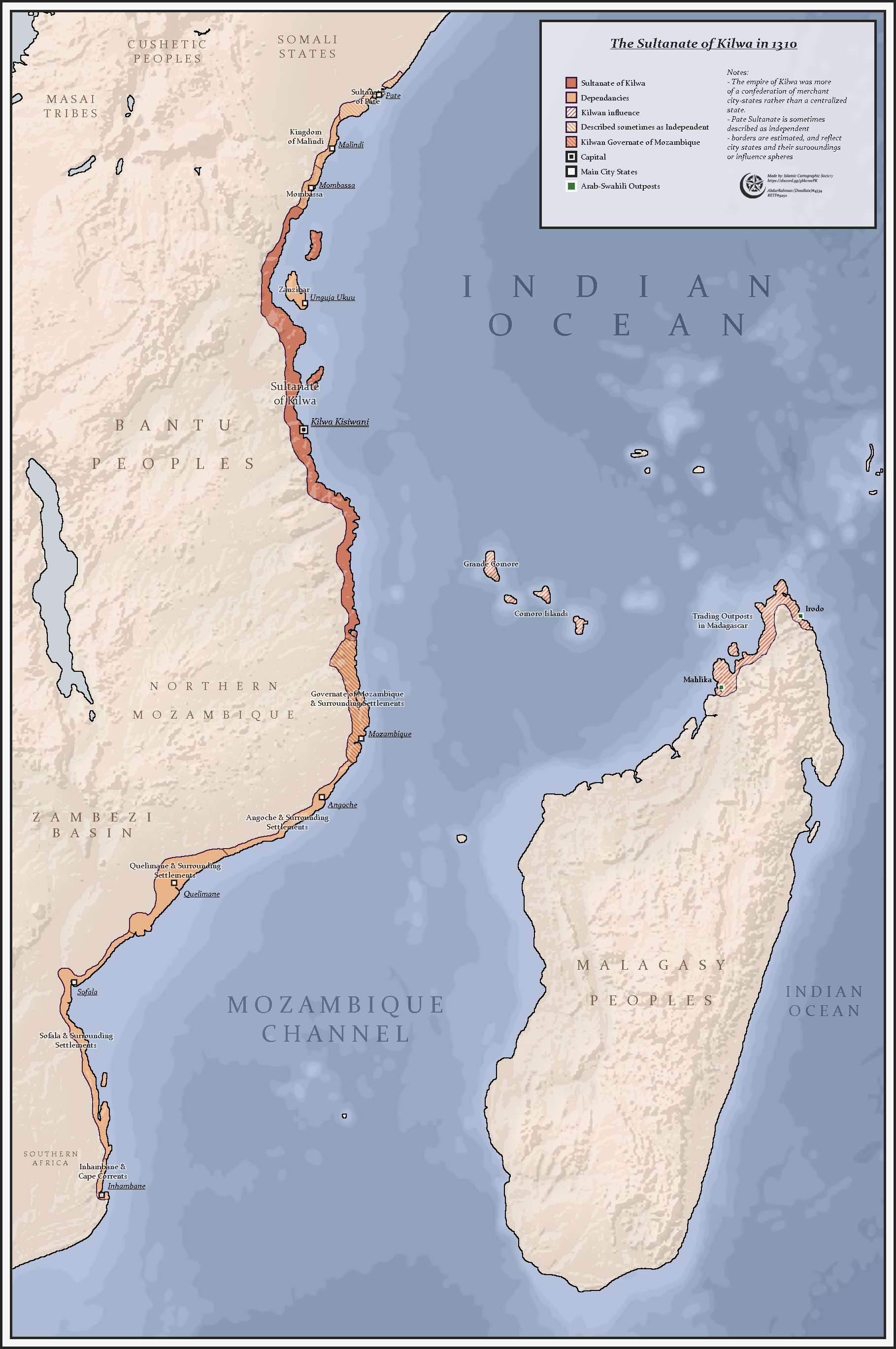
The Kilwa Sultanate in 1310

The wider region underwent a trade expansion from the 7th century, as the Swahili engaged in the flourishing Indian Ocean trade following the early Muslim conquests. Settlements further centralised and some major states included Gedi, Ungwana [de], Pate, Malindi, Mombasa, and Tanga in the north, Unguja Ukuu on Zanzibar, Kaole, Dar es Salaam, Kilwa, Kiswere, Monapo, Mozambique, and Angoche in the middle, and Quelimane, Sofala, Chibuene, and Inhambane in the south. Via mtumbwi, mtepe and later ngalawa they exported gold, iron, copper, ivory, slaves, pottery, cotton cloth, wood, grain, and rice, and imported silk, glassware, jewellery, Islamic pottery, and Chinese porcelain. Relations between the states fluctuated and varied, with Mombasa, Pate, and Kilwa emerging as the strongest. This prosperity led some Arab and Persian merchants to settle and assimilate into the various societies, and from the 8th to the 14th century the region gradually Islamised due to the increased trading opportunities it brought, with some oral traditions having rulers of Arab or Persian descent.

The Kilwa Chronicle, supposedly based on oral tradition, holds that a Persian prince from Shiraz arrived and acquired the island of Kilwa from the local inhabitants, before quarrel with the Bantu king led to the severing Kilwa's land bridge to the mainland. Settlements in northern Madagascar such as Mahilaka, Irodo, and Iharana also engaged in the trade, attracting Arab immigration. Bantu migrated to Madagascar and the Comoros from the 9th century, when zebu were first brought. From the 10th century Kilwa expanded its influence, coming to challenge the dominance of Somalian Mogadishu located to its north, however details of Kilwa's rise remain scarce. In the late 12th century Kilwa wrestled control of Sofala in the south, a key trading city linking to Great Zimbabwe in the interior and famous for its Zimbabwean gold, which was substantial in the usurpation of Mogadishu's hegemony, while also conquering Pemba and Zanzibar. Kilwa's administration consisted of representatives who ranged from governing their assigned cities to fulfilling the role of ambassador in the more powerful ones. Meanwhile, the Pate Chronicle has Pate conquering Shanga, Faza, and prosperous Manda, and was at one time led by the popular Fumo Liyongo. The islands of Pemba, Zanzibar, Lamu, Mafia and the Comoros were further settled by Shirazi and grew in importance due to their geographical positions for trade.

The Portuguese arrived in 1498. On a mission to economically control and Christianize the Swahili coast, the Portuguese attacked Kilwa first in 1505 and other cities later. Because of Swahili resistance, the Portuguese attempt at establishing commercial control was never successful. By the late 17th century, Portuguese authority on the Swahili coast began to diminish. With the help of Omani Arabs, by 1729 the Portuguese presence had been removed. The Swahili coast eventually became part of the Sultanate of Oman. Trade recovered, but it did not regain the levels of the past.

=== Urewe ===
The Urewe culture developed and spread in and around the Lake Victoria region of Africa during the African Iron Age. The culture's earliest dated artifacts are located in the Kagera Region of Tanzania, and it extended as far west as the Kivu region of the Democratic Republic of the Congo, as far east as the Nyanza and Western provinces of Kenya, and north into Uganda, Rwanda and Burundi. Sites from the Urewe culture date from the Early Iron Age, from the 5th century BC to the 6th century AD.

The origins of the Urewe culture are ultimately in the Bantu expansion originating in Cameroon. Research into early Iron Age civilizations in Sub-Saharan Africa has been undertaken concurrently with studies on African linguistics on Bantu expansion. The Urewe culture may correspond to the Eastern subfamily of Bantu languages, spoken by the descendants of the first wave of Bantu peoples to settle East Africa. At first sight, Urewe seems to be a fully developed civilization recognizable through its distinctive, stylish earthenware and highly technical and sophisticated iron working techniques. Given our current level of knowledge, neither seems to have developed or altered for nearly 2,000 years. However, minor local variations in the ceramic ware can be observed.

Urewe is the name of the site in Kenya brought to prominence through the publication in 1948 of Mary Leakey's archaeological findings. She described the early Iron Age period in the Great Lakes region in Central East Africa around Lake Victoria.

=== Madagascar and Merina ===
There is much debate around the chronology of the settlement of Madagascar, although most scholars agree that the island was further settled by Austronesian peoples from the 5th or 7th centuries AD who had proceeded through or around the Indian Ocean by outrigger boats, to also settle the Comoros. This second wave possibly found the island of Madagascar sparsely populated by descendants of the first wave a few centuries earlier, with the Vazimba of the interior's highlands being represented as primitive dwarves in Malagasy oral traditions and revered. Madagascar was subsequently settled by Bantu speakers from the east African mainland in the 6th or 7th century, according to archaeological and linguistic data. The Austronesians introduced banana and rice cultivation, and the Bantu speakers introduced cattle and other farming practices. About the year 1000, Arab and Indian trade settlement were started in northern Madagascar to exploit the Indian Ocean trade. By the 14th century, Islam was introduced on the island by traders. Madagascar functioned in the East African medieval period as a contact port for the other Swahili seaport city-states such as Sofala, Kilwa, Mombasa, and Zanzibar.

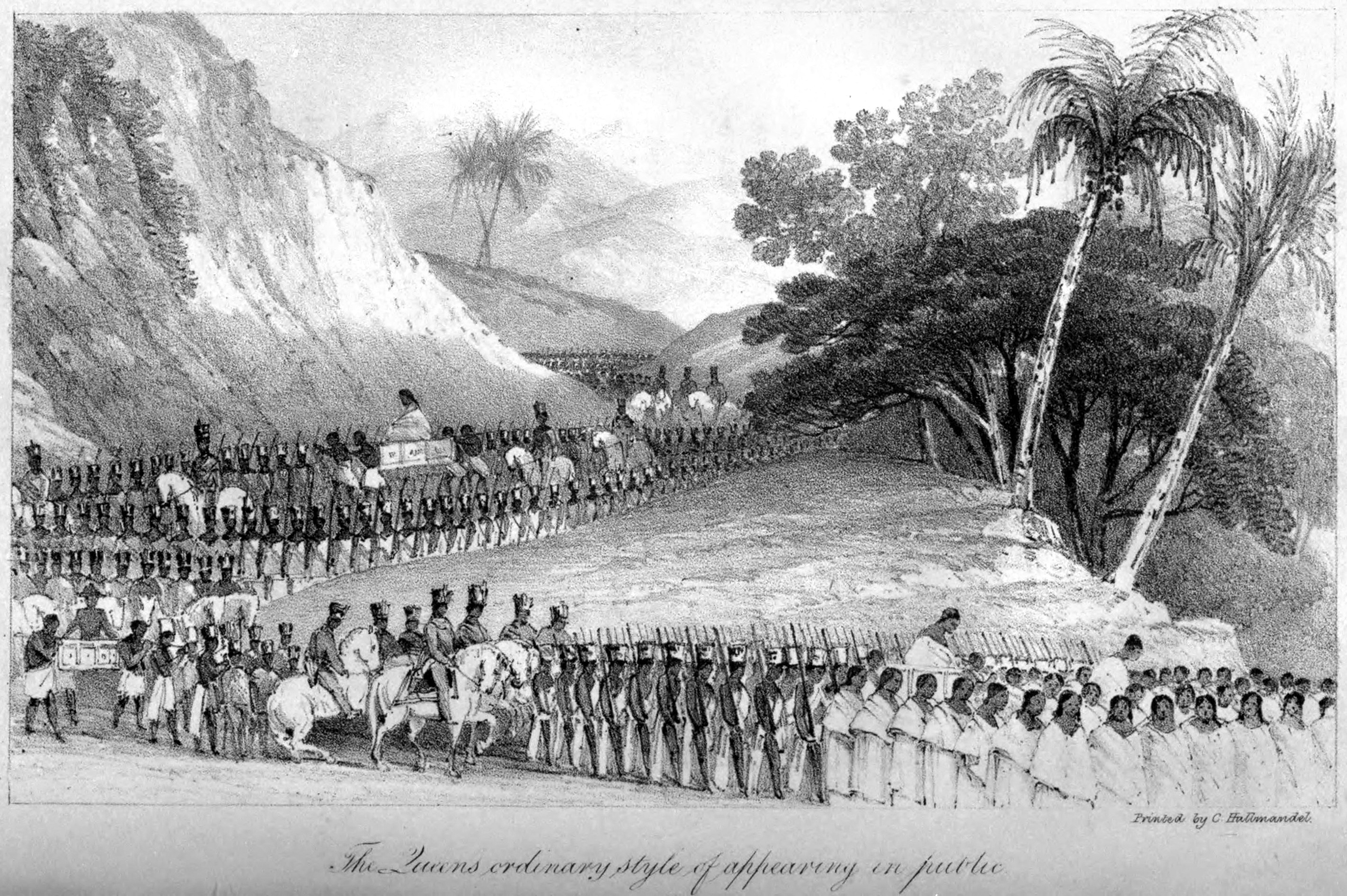
Queen Ranavalona I

By 1100, all regions of Madagascar were inhabited, although the total population remained small. Societies organised at the behest of hasina, which later evolved to embody kingship, and competed with one another over the island's estuaries, with oral histories describing bloody clashes and earlier settlers often pushed along the coast or inland. An Arab geographer wrote in 1224 that the island consisted of a great many towns and kingdoms, with kings making war on each other. Assisted by climate change, the peoples gradually transformed the island from dense forest to grassland for cultivation and zebu pastoralism. From the 13th century Muslim settlers arrived, integrating into the respective societies, and held high status owing to Islamic trading networks.

Several kingdoms emerged after the 15th century: the Sakalava Empire (c. 1600) along the west coast, Tsitambala Kingdom (17th century) on the east coast, and Merina (15th century) in the central highlands. By the 19th century, Merina controlled the whole island. In 1500, the Portuguese were the first Europeans on the island, raiding the trading settlements.

The British and later the French arrived. During the latter part of the 17th century, Madagascar was a popular transit point for pirates. Radama I (1810–1828) invited Christian missionaries in the early 19th century. Queen Ranavalona I "the Cruel" (1828–1861) banned the practice of Christianity in the kingdom, and an estimated 150,000 Christians perished. Under Radama II (1861–1863), Madagascar took a French orientation, with great commercial concession given to the French. In 1895, in the second Franco-Hova War, the French invaded Madagascar, taking over Antsiranana (Diego Suarez) and declaring Madagascar a protectorate.

=== Lake Plateau states and empires ===
Between the 14th and 15th centuries, large Southeast African kingdoms and states emerged, such as the Buganda and Karagwe Kingdoms of Uganda and Tanzania.

==== Empire of Kitara ====
By 1000 AD, numerous states had arisen on the Lake Plateau among the Great Lakes of East Africa. Cattle herding, cereal growing, and banana cultivation were the economic mainstays of these states. The Ntusi and Bigo earthworks are representative of one of the first states, the Bunyoro kingdom, which oral tradition stipulates was part of the Empire of Kitara that dominated the whole Lakes region. A Luo ethnic elite, from the Babito clan, ruled over the Bantu-speaking Nyoro people. The society was essentially Nyoro in its culture, based on the evidence from pottery, settlement patterns, and economic specialization.

The Babito clan claim legitimacy by being descended from the Bachwezi clan, who were said to have ruled the Empire of Kitara.

==== Buganda ====
The Buganda kingdom was founded by Kato Kimera around the 14th century AD. Kato Kintu may have migrated to the northwest of Lake Victoria as early as 1000 BC. Buganda was ruled by the kabaka with a bataka composed of the clan heads. Over time, the kabakas diluted the authority of the bataka, with Buganda becoming a centralized monarchy. By the 16th century, Buganda was engaged in expansion but had a serious rival in Bunyoro. By the 1870s, Buganda was a wealthy nation-state. The kabaka ruled with his Lukiko (council of ministers). Buganda had a naval fleet of a hundred vessels, each manned by thirty men. Buganda supplanted Bunyoro as the most important state in the region. However, by the early 20th century, Buganda became a province of the British Uganda Protectorate.

==== Rwanda ====
Southeast of Bunyoro, near Lake Kivu at the bottom of the western rift, the Kingdom of Rwanda was founded, perhaps during the 17th century. Tutsi (BaTutsi) pastoralists formed the elite, with a king called the mwami. The Hutu (BaHutu) were farmers. Both groups spoke the same language, but there were strict social norms against marrying each other and interaction. According to oral tradition, the Kingdom of Rwanda was founded by Mwami Ruganzu II (Ruganzu Ndori) (c. 1600 – 1624), with his capital near Kigali. It took 200 years to attain a truly centralized kingdom under Mwami Kigeli IV (Kigeri Rwabugiri) (1840–1895). Subjugation of the Hutu proved more difficult than subduing the Tutsi. The last Tutsi chief gave up to Mwami Mutara II (Mutara Rwogera) (1802–1853) in 1852, but the last Hutu holdout was conquered in the 1920s by Mwami Yuhi V (Yuli Musinga) (1896–1931).

==== Burundi ====
South of the Kingdom of Rwanda was the Kingdom of Burundi. It was founded by the Tutsi chief Ntare Rushatsi (c. 1657 – 1705). Like Rwanda, Burundi was built on cattle raised by Tutsi pastoralists, crops from Hutu farmers, conquest, and political innovations. Under Mwami Ntare Rugaamba (c. 1795 – 1852), Burundi pursued an aggressive expansionist policy, one based more on diplomacy than force.

=== Maravi ===
Maravi Kingdom

The Maravi claimed descent from Karonga (kalonga), who took that title as king. The Maravi connected Central Africa to the east coastal trade, with Swahili Kilwa. By the 17th century, the Maravi Empire encompassed all the area between Lake Malawi and the mouth of the Zambezi River. The karonga was Muzura, who did much to extend the empire. Muzura made a pact with the Portuguese to establish a 4,000-man army to attack the Shona in return for aid in defeating his rival Lundu, allied with the Zimba. In 1623, he turned on the Portuguese and assisted the Shona. In 1640, he welcomed back the Portuguese for trade. The Maravi Empire did not long survive the death of Muzura. By the 18th century, it had broken into its previous polities.

== West Africa ==
=== Sahelian empires and states ===
==== Ghana ====
The Ghana Empire

The 7th to 13th centuries in West Africa were a period of relatively abundant rainfall that saw the explosive growth of trade, particularly across the Sahara desert, and the flourishing of numerous important states. The introduction of the camel to the western Sahel was a watershed moment, allowing more merchandise to move more easily. These desert-side states are the first to appear in the written record, with Arab and Berber merchants from North Africa leaving descriptions of their power and wealth. Nevertheless, there remain big gaps in the historical record, and many details are speculative and/or based on much later traditions.

One of the most powerful and well known of these states was Wagadu, commonly called the Ghana Empire, likely the dominant player in the western Sahel from the 6th century onwards. Wagadu was the most powerful of a constellation of states stretching from Takrur on the Senegal river valley to Mema in the Niger valley, all of whom were subservient to Ghana at least some of the time. Like Wagadu, the Gao Empire which rose in the 7th century had at least seven kingdoms accepting their suzerainty. Both Gao and Kumbi Saleh (capital of Wagadu) grew fabulously rich through the trans-Saharan trade routes linking these cities with Tadmekka, Kairouan, and Sijilmassa in North Africa along which flowed trade in salt, gold, slaves, and more.

The arrival of Islam in West Africa had seismic consequences for the history of the entire region. By the 10th century, the king of Gao had converted, possibly to Ibadi Islam. In 1035 king War Jabi of Takrur became the first ruler to adopt Sunni Islam. The rise of the Almoravid Sanhaja in the 1050s, perhaps inspired and supported by Muslims in Takrur, pushed the leaders of Sahelian states to institutionalize Islam in the subsequent decades. Historians debate whether the Almoravids conquered Wagadu or merely dominated them politically but not militarily. In any case the period saw significant upheaval and a shift in trade patterns as previously important cities like Awdaghost and Tadmekka fell victim to the Almoravids and their allies. (Note: Soninke oral traditions hold that, intent on invading Ghana, the Almoravid army found the king respectful of Islam, and that he willingly adopted Islam with the exchange of gold for an imam relocating to Koumbi Saleh.) In the confusion, some vassals achieved independence such as Mema, Sosso, and Diarra/Diafunu, with the last two being especially powerful. Despite Wagadu regaining full independence and power throughout the 12th century, this could not counteract the worsening climate and shifts in trade south and east. Around the turn of the 13th century, the Sosso Empire united the region and conquered a weakened Ghana from its south, spurring large-scale Soninke out-migration. (Note: According to some traditions, Wagadu's fall is caused when a nobleman attempts to save a maiden from sacrifice against her wishes and kills Bida before escaping the population's ire on horseback, annulling Wagadu and Bida's prior assurance and unleashing a curse causing drought and famine, sometimes causing gold to be discovered in Bure. The Soninke generation that survived the drought were called "it has been hard for them" ("a jara nununa").)

==== Mali ====
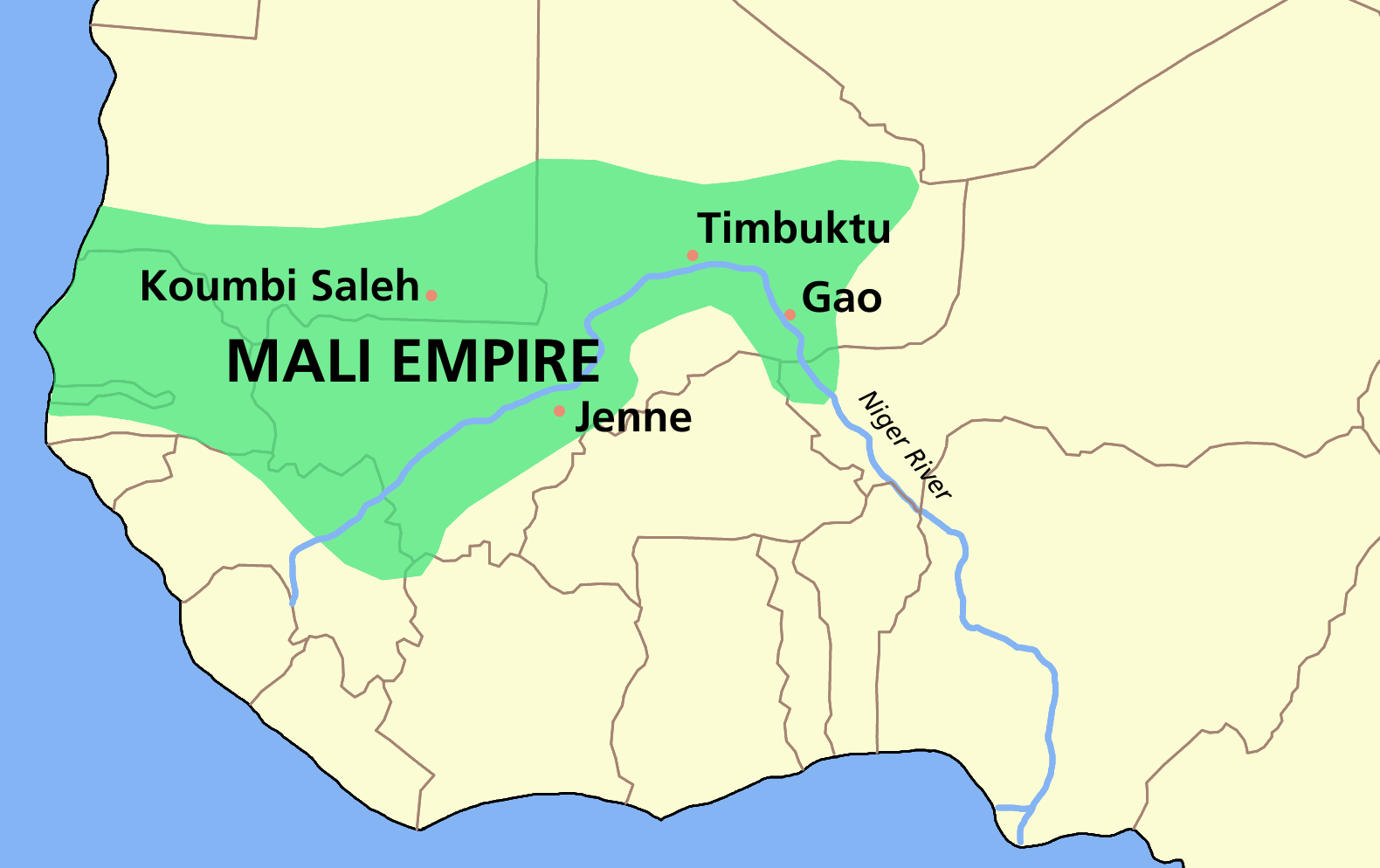
Mali Empire at its greatest extent

Sosso's Soumaoro Kante conquered Diarra, Gajaaga, and the Manding region. According to the oral Epic of Sundiata, Sundiata Keita, a Mandinka prince in exile, returned to Manden to save his people of the tyrannical Sosso king. Sundiata unified the Mandinka clans, allied with Mema, and defeated Soumaoro Kante at the Battle of Kirina in the early 13th century. He then proclaimed the Kouroukan Fouga of the nascent Mali Empire. Allied kingdoms, including Mema and Wagadu, retained leadership of their province, while conquered leaders were assigned a farin subordinate to the mansa (emperor), with provinces retaining a great deal of autonomy.

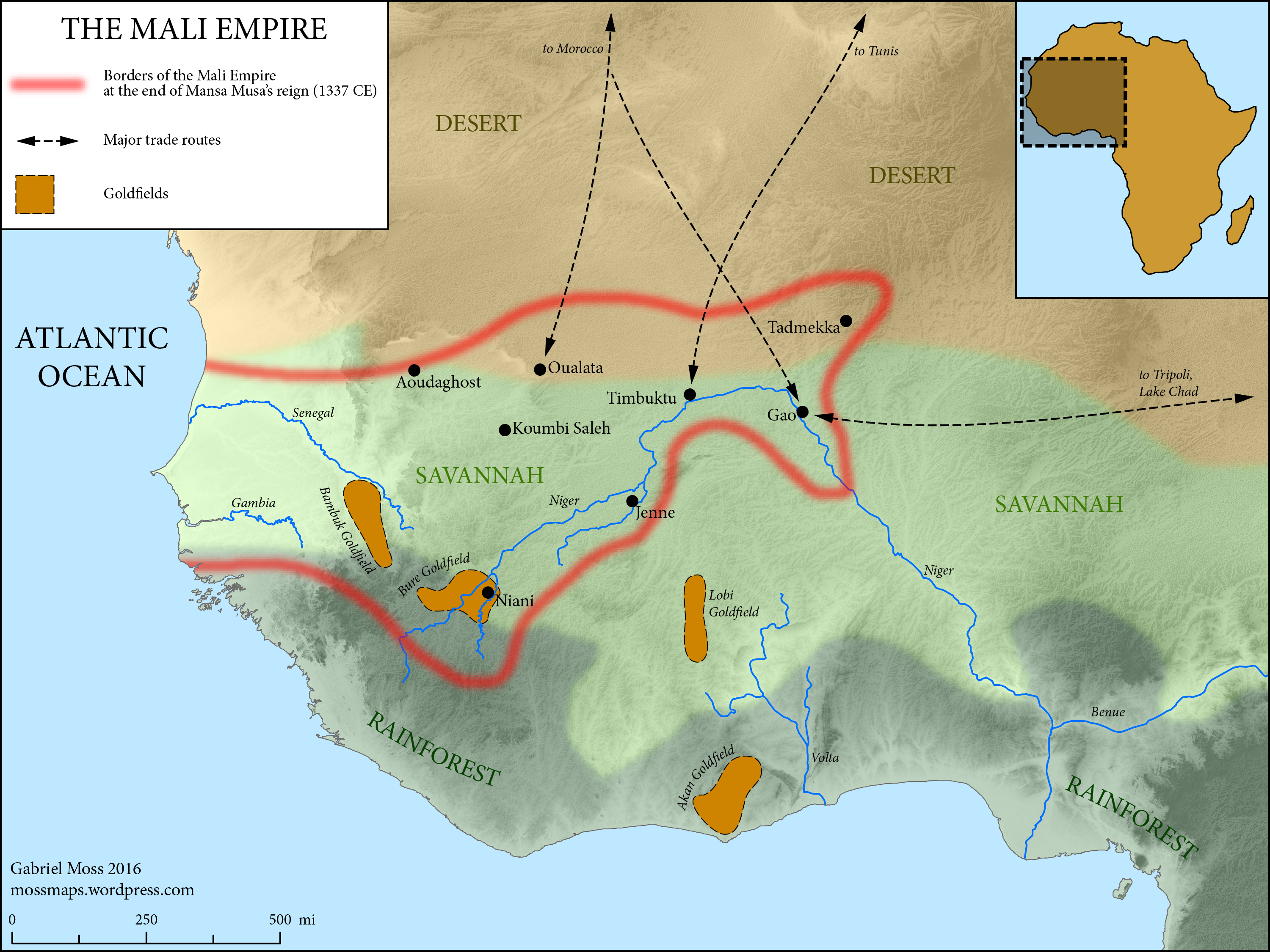
The Mali Empire in 1337 CE, with major gold fields, of Bambuk, Bure, Lobi (tended by the Gan and later Lobi people), and Akan, and trade routes, outlined. The desert should extend further south to Koumbi. The Mossi Kingdoms are located north of Lobi.

In addition to campaigns in the north to subdue Diafunu, Mali established suzerainty over the highlands of Fouta Djallon. After being insulted by the Wolof king of Kita, Sundiata sent Tiramakhan Traore west at the head of a large army, ultimately bringing most of Senegambia under the empire's control and, after defeating the Bainuk king, established dozens of Mandinka vassal kingdoms in the Gambia and Casamance basins, a region known as Kaabu.

Mali continued its expansion after the death of Sundiata. His son conquered Gajaaga and Takrur, and brought the key Saharan trading centres under his rule. The cessation of his reign culminated in a destructive civil war, only reconciled with a militaristic coup, after which Gao was conquered and the Tuareg subdued, cementing Mali's dominance over the trans-Saharan trade. In the 13th century Al-Hajj Salim Suwari, a Soninke Islamic scholar, pioneered the Suwarian tradition which sought to tolerate traditional religions, gaining popularity among West African Muslims. Mossi oral traditions tie the origins of the Mossi Kingdoms (located south of the Niger River) to the Mamprusi and Dagomba kingdoms in the forest regions, involving the Dagomba princess Yennenga. Ouagadougou and Yatenga were the most powerful.

Amid a Malian mansa's attempt to coerce the empire back into financial shape after the lacklustre premiership of his predecessor, Mali's northwestern-most province broke away to form the Jolof Empire and the Serer kingdoms. Wolof tradition holds that the empire was founded by the wise Ndiadiane Ndiaye, and it later absorbed neighbouring kingdoms to form a confederacy of the Wolof kingdoms of Jolof, Cayor, Baol, and Waalo, and the Serer kingdoms of Sine and Saloum. In Mali after the death of Musa II in 1387, vicious conflict ensued within the Keita dynasty. In the 14th century Yatenga attacked and sacked Timbuktu and Oualata. The internal conflict weakened Mali's central authority. This provided an opportunity for the previously subdued Tuareg tribal confederations in the Sahara to rebel. Over the next few decades they captured the main trading cities of Timbuktu, Oualata, Nema, and possibly Gao, with some tribes forming the north-eastern Sultanate of Agadez, and with them all usurping Mali's dominance over the trans-Saharan trade.

Although the salt and gold trade continued to be important to the Mali Empire, agriculture and pastoralism was also critical. The growing of sorghum, millet, and rice was a vital function. On the northern borders of the Sahel, grazing cattle, sheep, goats, and camels were major activities. Mande society was organize around the village and land. A cluster of villages was called a kafu, ruled by a farma. The farma paid tribute to the mansa. A dedicated army of elite cavalry and infantry maintained order, commanded by the royal court. A formidable force could be raised from tributary regions, if necessary.

Conversion to Islam was a gradual process. The power of the mansa depended on upholding traditional beliefs and a spiritual foundation of power. Sundiata initially kept Islam at bay. Later mansas were devout Muslims but still acknowledged traditional deities and took part in traditional rituals and festivals, which were important to the Mande. Islam became a court religion under Sundiata's son Uli I (1225–1270). Mansa Uli made a pilgrimage to Mecca, becoming recognized within the Muslim world. The court was staffed with literate Muslims as secretaries and accountants. Muslim traveller Ibn Battuta left vivid descriptions of the empire.

In 1312 Mansa Musa came to power in Mali after his predecessor had set out on an Atlantic voyage. Musa supposedly spent much of his early campaign preparing for his infamous hajj or pilgrimage to Mecca. Between 1324 and 1325 his entourage of over 10,000, and hundreds of camels, all carrying around 12 tonnes of gold in total, travelled 2700 miles, giving gifts to the poor along the way, and fostered good relations with the Mamluk sultan, garnering widespread attention in the Muslim world. On Musa's return, his general reasserted dominance over Gao and he commissioned a large construction program, building mosques and madrasas, with Timbuktu becoming a centre for trade and Islamic scholarship, however Musa features comparatively less than his predecessors in Mandinka oral traditions than in modern histories. Despite Mali's fame being attributed to its riches in gold, its prosperous economy was based on arable and pastoral farming, as well as crafts, and they traded commonly with the Akan, Dyula, and with Benin, Ife, and Nri in the forest regions.

After the reign of Mansa Suleyman (1341–1360), Mali began its spiral downward. Mossi cavalry raided the exposed southern border. Tuareg harassed the northern border in order to retake Timbuktu. Fulani (Fulbe) eroded Mali's authority in the west by establishing the independent Imamate of Futa Toro, a successor to the kingdom of Takrur. Serer and Wolof alliances were broken. In 1545 to 1546, the Songhai Empire took Niani. After 1599, the empire lost the Bambouk goldfields and disintegrated into petty polities.

==== Songhai ====
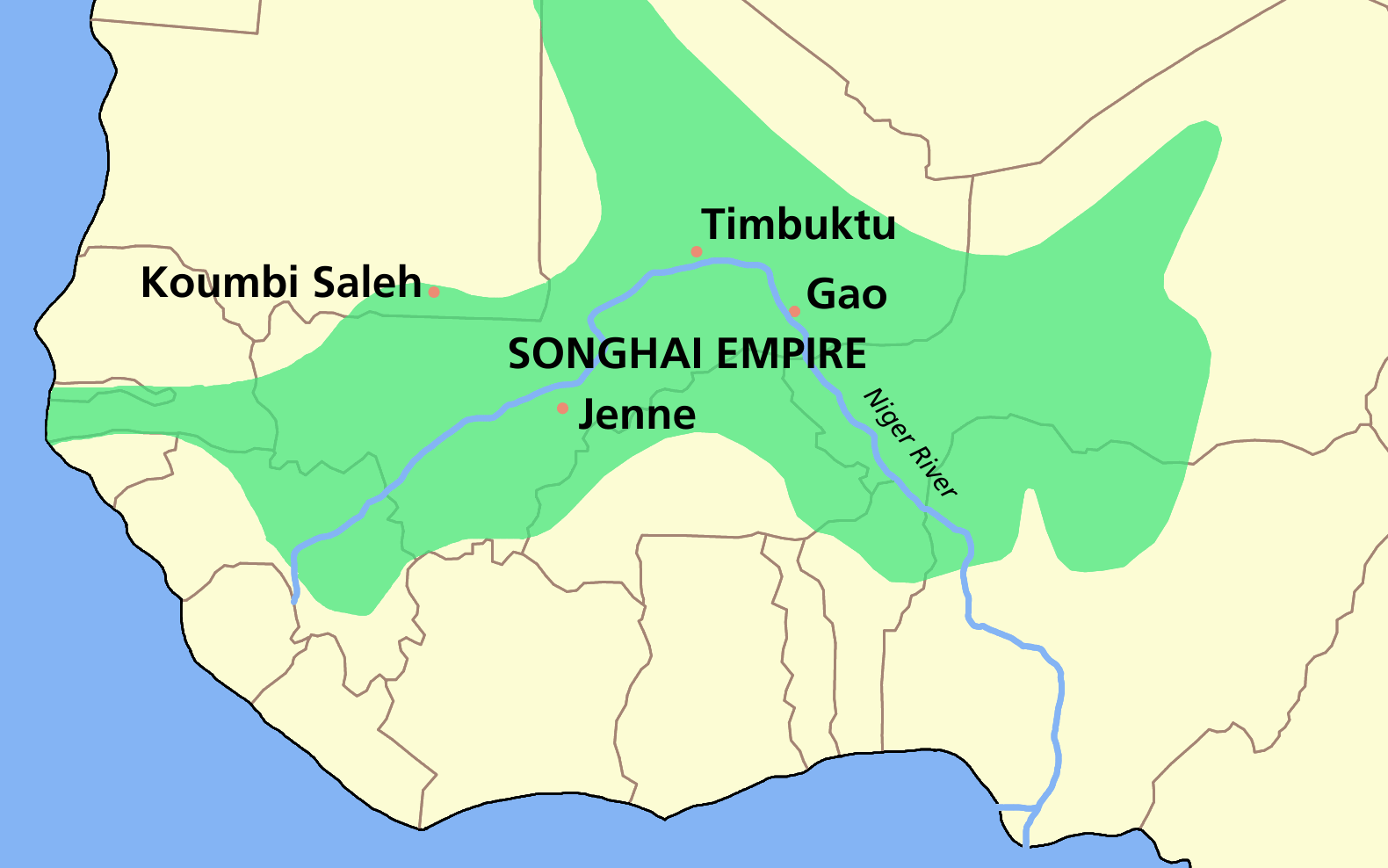
The Songhai Empire, c. 1500

The Songhai people are descended from fishermen on the Middle Niger River. They established their capital at Kukiya in the 9th century AD and at Gao in the 12th century. The Songhai speak a Nilo-Saharan language.

Sonni Ali, a Songhai, began his conquest by capturing Timbuktu in 1468 from the Tuareg. He extended the empire to the north, deep into the desert, pushed the Mossi further south of the Niger, and expanded southwest to Djenne. His army consisted of cavalry and a fleet of canoes. Sonni Ali was not a pious Muslim, and he was portrayed negatively by Berber-Arab scholars, especially for attacking Muslim Timbuktu after having protected and saved them from the Tuareg occupation. After his death in 1492, his heirs were deposed by his nephew a General Askia Mohammad I, son of kassey, a Sonni Ali sister.

Muhammad Ture (1493–1528) founded the Askiya dynasty, askiya being the title of the king. He consolidated the conquests of Sonni Ali. Islam was used to extend his authority by declaring jihad on the Mossi, reviving the trans-Saharan trade, and having the Abbasid "shadow" caliph in Cairo declare him as caliph of Sudan. He established Timbuktu as a great center of Islamic learning. Muhammad Ture expanded the empire by pushing the Tuareg north, capturing Aïr in the east, and capturing salt-producing Taghaza. He brought the Hausa states into the Songhay trading network. He further centralized the administration of the empire by selecting administrators from loyal servants and families and assigning them to conquered territories. They were responsible for raising local militias. Centralization made Songhay very stable, even during dynastic disputes. Leo Africanus left vivid descriptions of the empire under Askiya Muhammad. Askiya Muhammad was deposed by his son in 1528. After much rivalry, Muhammad Ture's last son Askiya Daoud (1529–1582) assumed the throne.

In 1591, Morocco invaded the Songhai Empire under Ahmad al-Mansur of the Saadi dynasty in order to secure the goldfields of the Sahel. At the Battle of Tondibi, the Songhai army was defeated. The Moroccans captured Djenne, Gao, and Timbuktu, but they were unable to secure the whole region. Askiya Nuhu and the Songhay army regrouped at Dendi in the heart of Songhai territory where a spirited guerrilla resistance sapped the resources of the Moroccans, who were dependent upon constant resupply from Morocco. Songhai split into several states during the 17th century.

Morocco found its venture unprofitable. The gold trade had been diverted to Europeans on the coast. Most of the trans-Saharan trade was now diverted east to Bornu. Expensive equipment purchased with gold had to be sent across the Sahara, an unsustainable scenario. The Moroccans who remained married into the population and were referred to as Arma or Ruma. They established themselves at Timbuktu as a military caste with various fiefs, independent from Morocco. Amid the chaos, other groups began to assert themselves, including the Fulani of Futa Tooro who encroached from the west. The Bambara Empire, one of the states that broke from Songhai, sacked Gao. In 1737, the Tuareg massacred the Arma.

==== Sokoto Caliphate ====
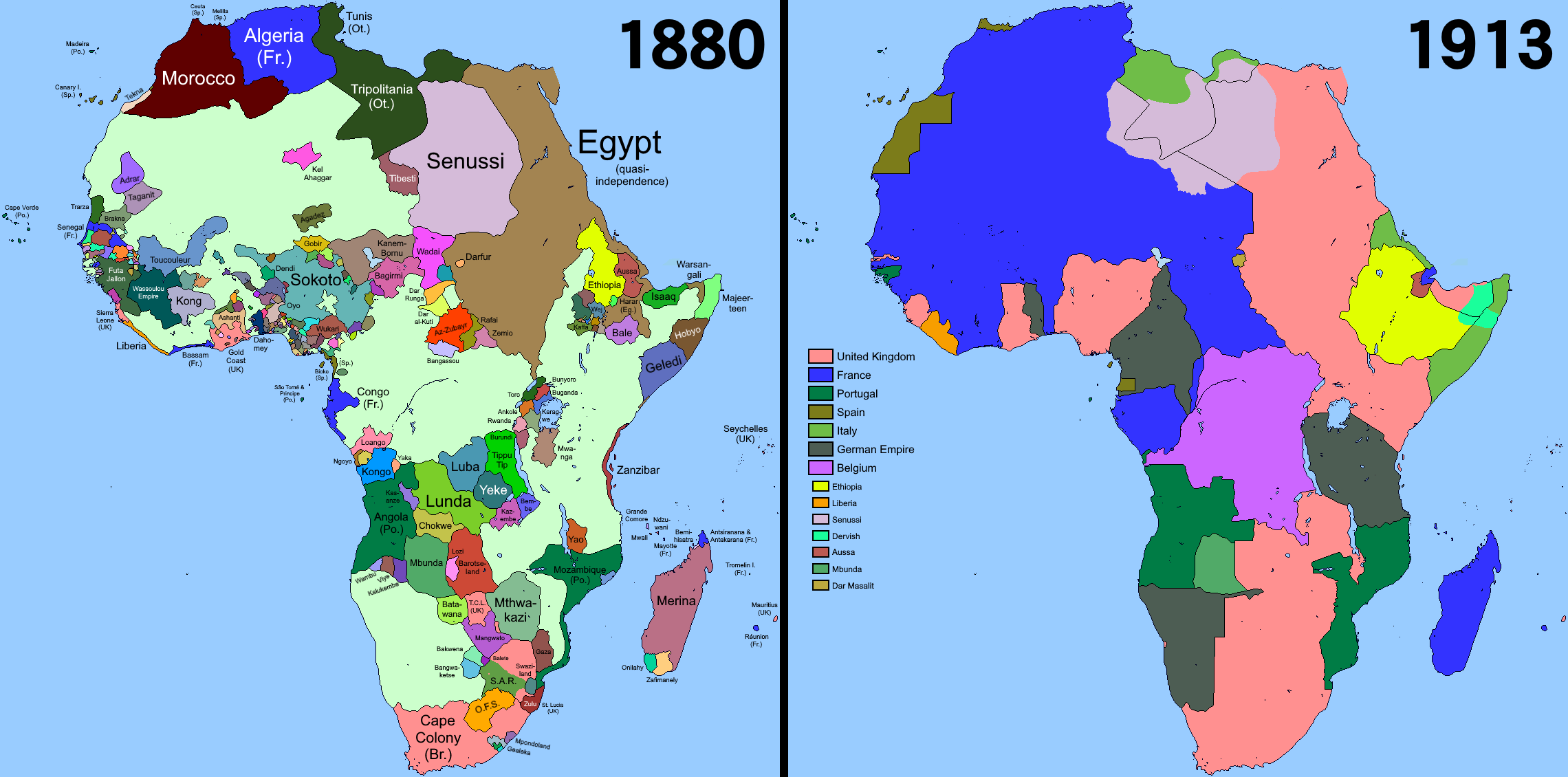
Comparison of Africa in the years 1880 and 1913

The Fulani were migratory people. They moved from Mauritania and settled in Futa Tooro, Futa Djallon, and subsequently throughout the rest of West Africa. By the 14th century CE, they had converted to Islam. During the 16th century, they established themselves at Macina in southern Mali. During the 1670s, they declared jihads on non-Muslims. Several states were formed from these jihadist wars, at Futa Toro, Futa Djallon, Macina, Oualia, and Bundu. The most important of these states was the Sokoto Caliphate or Fulani Empire.

In the city of Gobir, Usman dan Fodio (1754–1817) accused the Hausa leadership of practicing an impure version of Islam and of being morally corrupt. In 1804, he launched the Fulani War as a jihad among a population that was restless about high taxes and discontented with its leaders. Jihad fever swept northern Nigeria, with strong support among both the Fulani and the Hausa. Usman created an empire that included parts of northern Nigeria, Benin, and Cameroon, with Sokoto as its capital. He retired to teach and write and handed the empire to his son Muhammed Bello. The Sokoto Caliphate lasted until 1903 when the British conquered northern Nigeria.

=== Forest empires and states ===
==== Akan kingdoms and emergence of Asante Empire ====
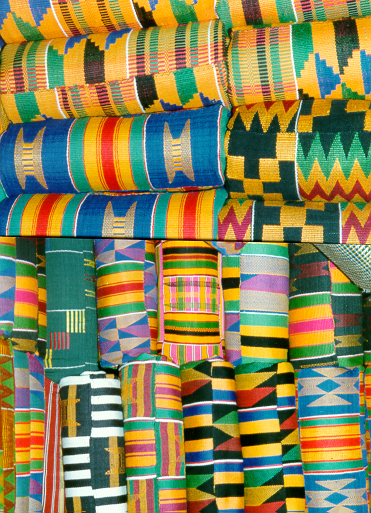
Ashanti Kente cloth patterns

The Akan speak a Kwa language. The speakers of Kwa languages are believed to have come from East/Central Africa, before settling in the Sahel. By the 12th century, the Akan Kingdom of Bonoman (Bono State) was established. During the 13th century, when the gold mines in modern-day Mali started to dry up, Bonoman and later other Akan states began to rise to prominence as the major players in the Gold trade. It was Bonoman and other Akan kingdoms like Denkyira, Akyem, Akwamu which were the predecessors, and later the emergence of the Empire of Ashanti. When and how the Ashante got to their present location is debatable. What is known is that by the 17th century an Akan people were identified as living in a state called Kwaaman. The location of the state was north of Lake Bosomtwe. The state's revenue was mainly derived from trading in gold and kola nuts and clearing forest to plant yams. They built towns between the Pra and Ofin rivers. They formed alliances for defense and paid tribute to Denkyira one of the more powerful Akan states at that time along with Adansi and Akwamu. During the 16th century, Ashante society experienced sudden changes, including population growth because of cultivation of New World plants such as cassava and maize and an increase in the gold trade between the coast and the north.

By the 17th century, Osei Kofi Tutu I (c. 1695 – 1717), with help of Okomfo Anokye, unified what became the Ashante into a confederation with the Golden Stool as a symbol of their unity and spirit. Osei Tutu engaged in a massive territorial expansion. He built up the Ashante army based on the Akan state of Akwamu, introducing new organization and turning a disciplined militia into an effective fighting machine. In 1701, the Ashante conquered Denkyira, giving them access to the coastal trade with Europeans, especially the Dutch. Opoku Ware I (1720–1745) engaged in further expansion, adding other southern Akan states to the growing empire. He turned north adding Techiman, Banda, Gyaaman, and Gonja, states on the Black Volta. Between 1744 and 1745, Asantehene Opoku attacked the powerful northern state of Dagomba, gaining control of the important middle Niger trade routes. Kusi Obodom (1750–1764) succeeded Opoku. He solidified all the newly won territories. Osei Kwadwo (1777–1803) imposed administrative reforms that allowed the empire to be governed effectively and to continue its military expansion. Osei Kwame Panyin (1777–1803), Osei Tutu Kwame (1804–1807), and Osei Bonsu (1807–1824) continued territorial consolidation and expansion. The Ashante Empire included all of present-day Ghana and large parts of the Ivory Coast.

The Ashantehene inherited his position from his mother. He was assisted at the capital, Kumasi, by a civil service of men talented in trade, diplomacy, and the military, with a head called the Gyaasehene. Men from Arabia, Sudan, and Europe were employed in the civil service, all of them appointed by the Ashantehene. At the capital and in other towns, the ankobia or special police were used as bodyguards to the Ashantehene, as sources of intelligence, and to suppress rebellion. Communication throughout the empire was maintained via a network of well-kept roads from the coast to the middle Niger and linking together other trade cities.

For most of the 19th century, the Ashante Empire remained powerful. It was later destroyed in 1900 by British superior weaponry and organization following the four Anglo-Ashanti wars.

==== Dahomey ====
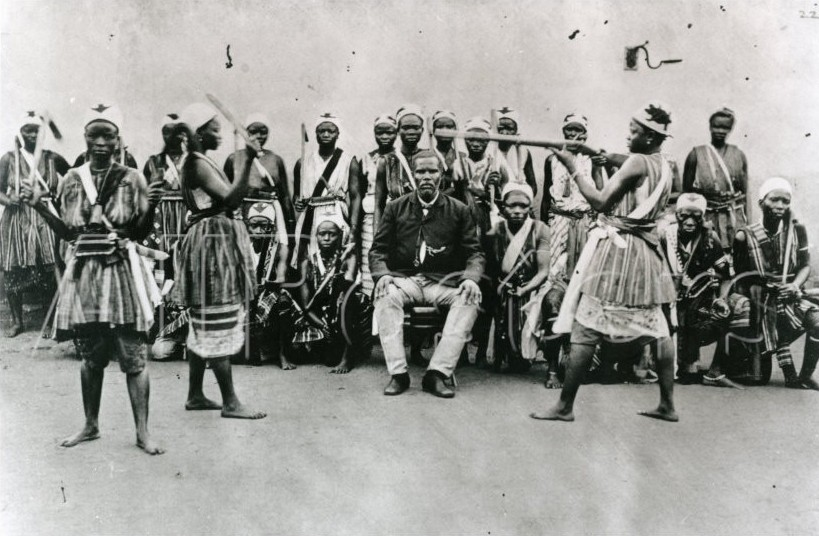
Dahomey Amazons, an all-women fighting unit

The Dahomey Kingdom was founded in the early 17th century when the Aja people of the Allada kingdom moved northward and settled among the Fon. They began to assert their power a few years later. In so doing they established the Kingdom of Dahomey, with its capital at Agbome. King Houegbadja (c. 1645 – 1685) organized Dahomey into a powerful centralized state. He declared all lands to be owned of the king and subject to taxation. Primogeniture in the kingship was established, neutralizing all input from village chiefs. A "cult of kingship" was established. A captive slave would be sacrificed annually to honor the royal ancestors. During the 1720s, the slave-trading states of Whydah and Allada were taken, giving Dahomey direct access to the slave coast and trade with Europeans. King Agadja (1708–1740) attempted to end the slave trade by keeping the slaves on plantations producing palm oil, but the European profits on slaves and Dahomey's dependency on firearms were too great. In 1730, under king Agaja, Dahomey was conquered by the Oyo Empire, and Dahomey had to pay tribute. Taxes on slaves were mostly paid in cowrie shells. During the 19th century, palm oil was the main trading commodity. France conquered Dahomey during the Second Franco-Dahomean War (1892–1894) and established a colonial government there. Most of the troops who fought against Dahomey were native Africans.

==== Yoruba ====
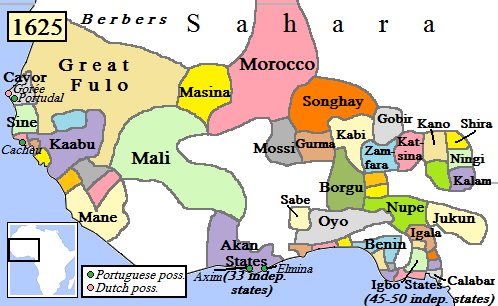
Oyo Empire and surrounding states, c. 1625

Traditionally, the Yoruba people viewed themselves as the inhabitants of a united empire, in contrast to the situation today, in which "Yoruba" is the cultural-linguistic designation for speakers of a language in the Niger–Congo family. The name comes from a Hausa word to refer to the Oyo Empire. The first Yoruba state was Ile-Ife, said to have been founded around 1000 AD by a supernatural figure, the first oni Oduduwa. Oduduwa's sons would be the founders of the different city-states of the Yoruba, and his daughters would become the mothers of the various Yoruba obas, or kings. Yoruba city-states were usually governed by an oba and an iwarefa, a council of chiefs who advised the oba. by the 18th century, the Yoruba city-states formed a loose confederation, with the Oni of Ife as the head and Ife as the capital. As time went on, the individual city-states became more powerful with their obas assuming more powerful spiritual positions and diluting the authority of the Oni of Ife. Rivalry became intense among the city-states.

The Oyo Empire rose in the 16th century. The Oyo state had been conquered in 1550 by the kingdom of Nupe, which was in possession of cavalry, an important tactical advantage. The alafin (king) of Oyo was sent into exile. After returning, Alafin Orompoto (c. 1560 – 1580) built up an army based on heavily armed cavalry and long-service troops. This made them invincible in combat on the northern grasslands and in the thinly wooded forests. By the end of the 16th century, Oyo had added the western region of the Niger to the hills of Togo, the Yoruba of Ketu, Dahomey, and the Fon nation.

A governing council served the empire, with clear executive divisions. Each acquired region was assigned a local administrator. Families served in king-making capacities. Oyo, as a northern Yoruba kingdom, served as middle-man in the north–south trade and connecting the eastern forest of Guinea with the western and central Sudan, the Sahara, and North Africa. The Yoruba manufactured cloth, ironware, and pottery, which were exchanged for salt, leather, and most importantly horses from the Sudan to maintain the cavalry. Oyo remained strong for two hundred years. It became a protectorate of Great Britain in 1888, before further fragmenting into warring factions. The Oyo state ceased to exist as any sort of power in 1896.

==== Benin ====
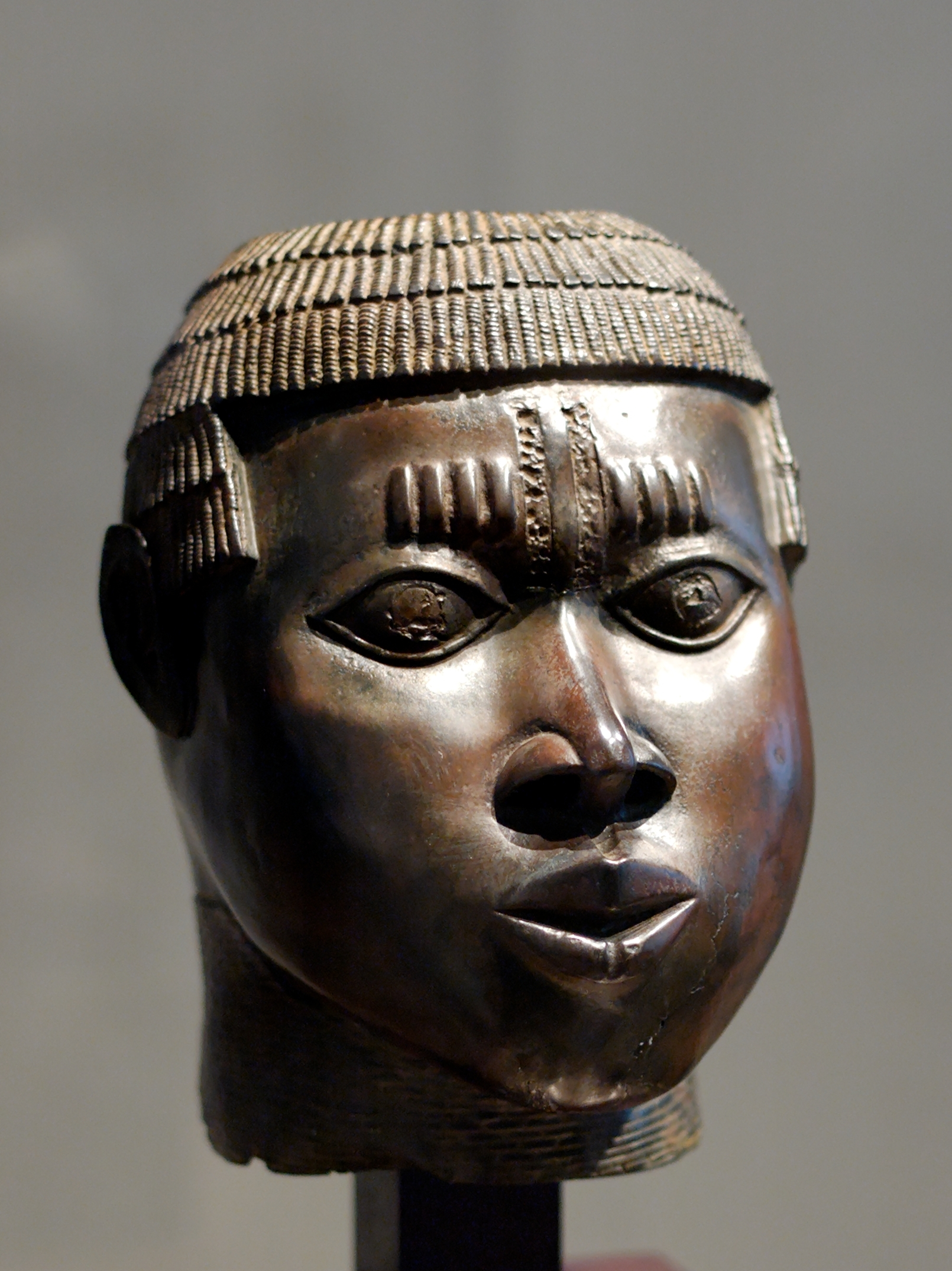
"Benin Bronze" (brass)

The Kwa Niger–Congo speaking Edo people had established the Benin Empire by the middle of the 15th century. It was engaged in political expansion and consolidation from its very beginning. Under Oba (king) Ewuare (c. 1450 – 1480 AD), the state was organized for conquest. He solidified central authority and initiated 30 years of war with his neighbors. At his death, the Benin Empire extended to Dahomey in the west, to the Niger Delta in the east, along the west African coast, and to the Yoruba towns in the north.

Ewuare's grandson Oba Esigie (1504–1550) eroded the power of the uzama (state council) and increased contact and trade with Europeans, especially with the Portuguese who provided a new source of copper for court art. The oba ruled with the advice of the uzama, a council consisting of chiefs of powerful families and town chiefs of different guilds. Later its authority was diminished by the establishment of administrative dignitaries. Women wielded power. The queen mother who produced the future oba wielded immense influence.

Benin was never a significant exporter of slaves, as Alan Ryder's book Benin and the Europeans showed. By the early 18th century, it was wrecked with dynastic disputes and civil wars. However, it regained much of its former power in the reigns of Oba Eresoyen and Oba Akengbuda. After the 16th century, Benin mainly exported pepper, ivory, gum, and cotton cloth to the Portuguese and Dutch who resold it to other African societies on the coast. In 1897, the British sacked the city.

==== Niger Delta and Igbo ====
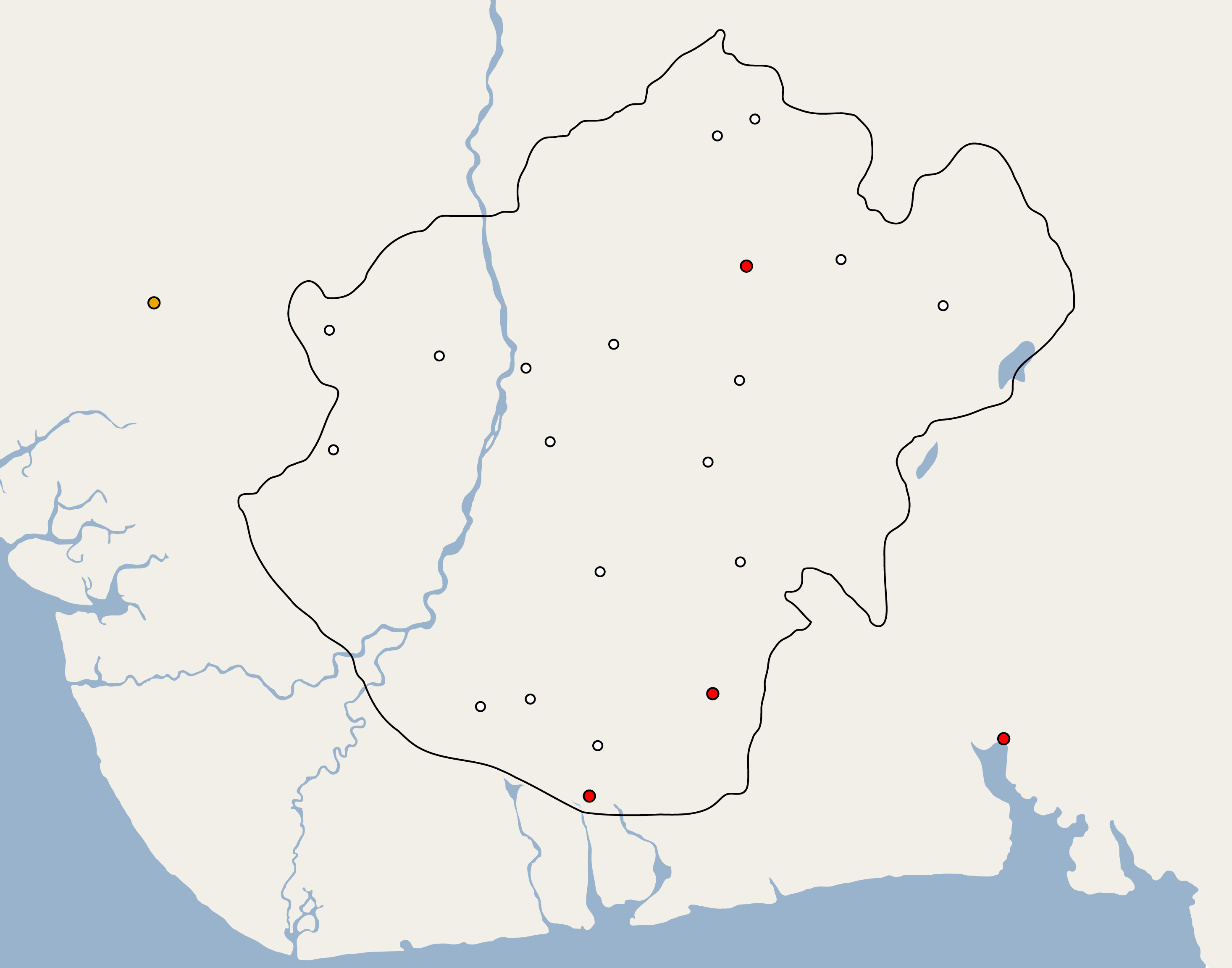

The Niger Delta comprised numerous city-states with numerous forms of government. These city-states were protected by the waterways and thick vegetation of the delta. The region was transformed by trade in the 17th century. The delta's city-states were comparable to those of the Swahili people in East Africa. Some, like Bonny, Kalabari, and Warri, had kings. Others, like Brass, were republics with small senates, and those at Cross River and Old Calabar were ruled by merchants of the ekpe society. The ekpe society regulated trade and made rules for members known as house systems. Some of these houses, like the Pepples of Bonny, were well known in the Americas and Europe.

The Igbo lived east of the delta (but with the Anioma on the west of the Niger River). The Kingdom of Nri rose in the 9th century, with the Eze Nri being its leader. It was a political entity composed of villages, and each village was autonomous and independent with its own territory and name, each recognized by its neighbors. Villages were democratic with all males and sometimes females a part of the decision-making process. Graves at Igbo-Ukwu (800 AD) contained brass artifacts of local manufacture and glass beads from Egypt or India, indicative of extraregional trade.

== See also ==
- List of kingdoms in Africa throughout history

== Sources ==
- Appiah, Kwame Anthony & Gates, Henry Louis Jr., eds. (2010). Encyclopedia of Africa. Oxford: Oxford University Press. ISBN 978-0-19-533770-9.
- Beshah, Girma; Aregay, Merid Wolde (1964). The Question of the Union of the Churches in Luso-Ethiopian Relations (1500–1632). Lisbon: Junta de Investigações do Ultramar and Centro de Estudos Históricos Ultramarinos.
- Collins, Robert O.; Burns, James M. (2007). A History of Sub-Saharan Africa. New York: Cambridge University Press. ISBN 978-0-521-68708-9.
- Davidson, Basil (1971). Great Ages of Man: African Kingdoms. New York: Time Life Books. LCCN 66-25647.
- Davidson, Basil (1991). Africa In History, Themes and Outlines (Revised and expanded ed.). New York: Simon & Schuster. ISBN 0-684-82667-4.
- Ehret, Christopher (2002). The Civilizations of Africa. Charlottesville, Virginia: University of Virginia. ISBN 0-8139-2085-X.
- Falola, Toyin (2008-04-24). A History of Nigeria. Cambridge University Press. ISBN 978-1-139-47203-6.
- Gomez, Michael (2018). African dominion: a new history of empire in early and medieval West Africa. Princeton, NJ: Princeton University Press. ISBN 978-0-691-17742-7.
- Iliffe, John (2007). Africans: The History of a Continent (2nd ed.). New York: Cambridge University Press. ISBN 978-0-521-68297-8.
- Levtzion, Nehemia; Hopkins, John F.P., eds. (2000). Corpus of Early Arabic Sources for West Africa. New York, NY: Marcus Weiner Press. ISBN 1-55876-241-8.
- Lye, Keith, ed. (2002). Encyclopedia of African Nations and Civilization. Facts on File library of world history. New York: Diagram Group. ISBN 0-8160-4568-2.
- Martin, Phyllis M.; O'Meara, Patrick (1995). Africa (3rd ed.). Bloomington: Indiana University Press. ISBN 0-253-20984-6.
- Page, Willie F. (2001). Encyclopedia of African History and Culture: From Conquest to Colonization (1500–1850). New York: Learning Source Books. ISBN 0-8160-4472-4.
- Shillington, Kevin (2005). History of Africa (Revised 2nd ed.). New York: Palgrave Macmillan. ISBN 0-333-59957-8.
- Udo, Reuben K. (1970). Geographical Regions of Nigeria. University of California Press.
