= Kisama =

Kisama may refer to:

- Kisama Heritage Village, Nagaland, India
- Quiçama, municipality in Angola
- kisama, extremely rude "you" in modern Japanese
- Kisama (Africa), territory and polity in the history of Kongo
