= Mpemba =

13th century Bantu confederation in the Congo Basin

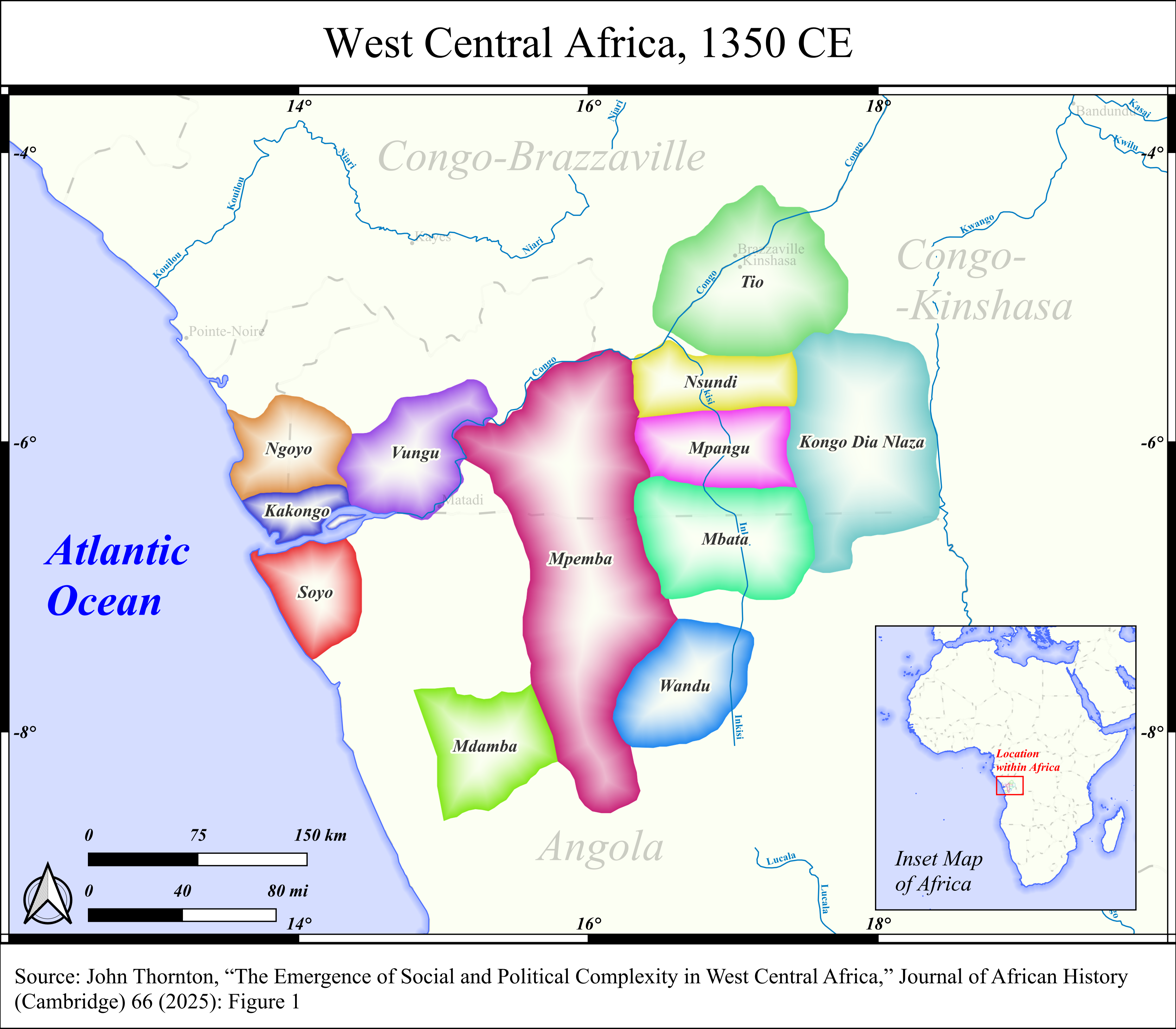
States of the western Congo Basin, c. 1350

Mpemba was a confederation in the western Congo Basin, at least from the 13th century. Its northernmost territory, Mpemba Kasi, was incorporated into the founding of the Kingdom of Kongo in the 14th century, and it was conquered. It neighboured the confederations of Vungu and Seven Kingdoms of Kongo dia Nlaza. Its capital and southernmost tip was on the Loze River in Angola, and it reached northwards 150 kilometres to the Congo River. It had sub-kingdoms, such as Mpemba Kasi, and Vunda which was complex enough to have its own sub-units which included Mpangala.

Writing in 2025, John Thornton has proposed that Mpemba was a very large kingdom, roughly a third of the size of Kongo's greatest extent, and was Kongo's main predecessor, though he says that archaeological research at Mpemba's capital is needed.
