= Mpemba Kasi =

African kingdom

Mpemba Kasi is the traditional name of a large Bantu kingdom which was the northernmost territory of the confederation Mpemba, and to the south of the Mbata Kingdom. It merged with that state to form the Kingdom of Kongo around 1375 AD. In Kongo traditions it is considered the "Mother of Kongo".

Kasi is described as a very large territory, but not as powerful. Its last ruler, according to oral tradition, was named Nimi a Nzima.
