= Battle of Dimurwa =

- Part of Rabih az-Zubayr's invasion of Bornu
| Date | February/March 1894 (?) |
| Location | Dimurwa, Bornu |
| Result | Rabih az-Zubayr victory |

Belligerents
| Kanem–Bornu Empire | Rabih az-Zubayr's forces |

Commanders and leaders
| Kyari | Rabih az-Zubayr |

Strength
| Unknown | Unknown |

Casualties and losses
| Unknown | Unknown |

The battle of Dimurwa was the third battle and last major confrontation between the Kanem–Bornu Empire and the warlord Rabih az-Zubayr during Rabih's invasion of the empire. The battle was probably fought in February or March 1894 at Dimurwa, on the banks of the Yobe River.

== Background ==
In the aftermath of the Kanem–Bornu Empire's previous loss to Rabih az-Zubayr at the battle of Lekarawa and Rabih's brutal sack of Kukawa, the imperial capital, shehu Ashimi's leadership of the empire came into question. In late 1893, Ashimi was deposed and his nephew Kyari was proclaimed as shehu in his stead. Shortly thereafter, Kyari had Ashimi assassinated. As the new shehu, Kyari regrouped the imperial army and made preparations to attempt to retake Kukawa and strike at Dikwa, Rabih's seat of power.

== Battle ==
As Kyari advanced towards Kukawa and Dikwa, Rabih pre-emptively attacked his army at Dimurwa, near Gashegar on the banks of the Yobe River. It is unknown exactly when the battle took place, but it was probably in February or March 1894. The fighting is said to have taken place during a storm with thunder and strong winds, but no rain.

During the battle, Kyari's forces managed to overrun Rabih's positions and put Rabih to flight. The Bornuan army celebrated this initial victory and occupied Rabih's war camp. While celebrating they failed to press their advantage, deciding to wait until next morning to pursue Rabih's army. Rabih meanwhile regrouped his forces at a pre-arranged spot and counter-attacked in the night. Kyari's army fled during this attack and the shehu himself was wounded in the fighting. Kyari made attempts to rally his army but was unable to do so. As dawn approached, Kyari and some of the bravest of his soldiers, including three of his brothers, made a last stand against Rabih but were eventually captured and then executed.

== Aftermath ==
After the defeat at Dimurwa, Kyari's brother Sanda Wuduroma fled to southern Bornu, where he was proclaimed shehu. Sanda Wuduroma was captured by Rabih's forces after less than a month and also executed, leaving Rabih as the undisputed ruler of Bornu, a position he retained for the next six years.
