= Kanem–Bornu Empire =

Empire around Lake Chad, Africa, c. 700–1902

- c. 700–1902
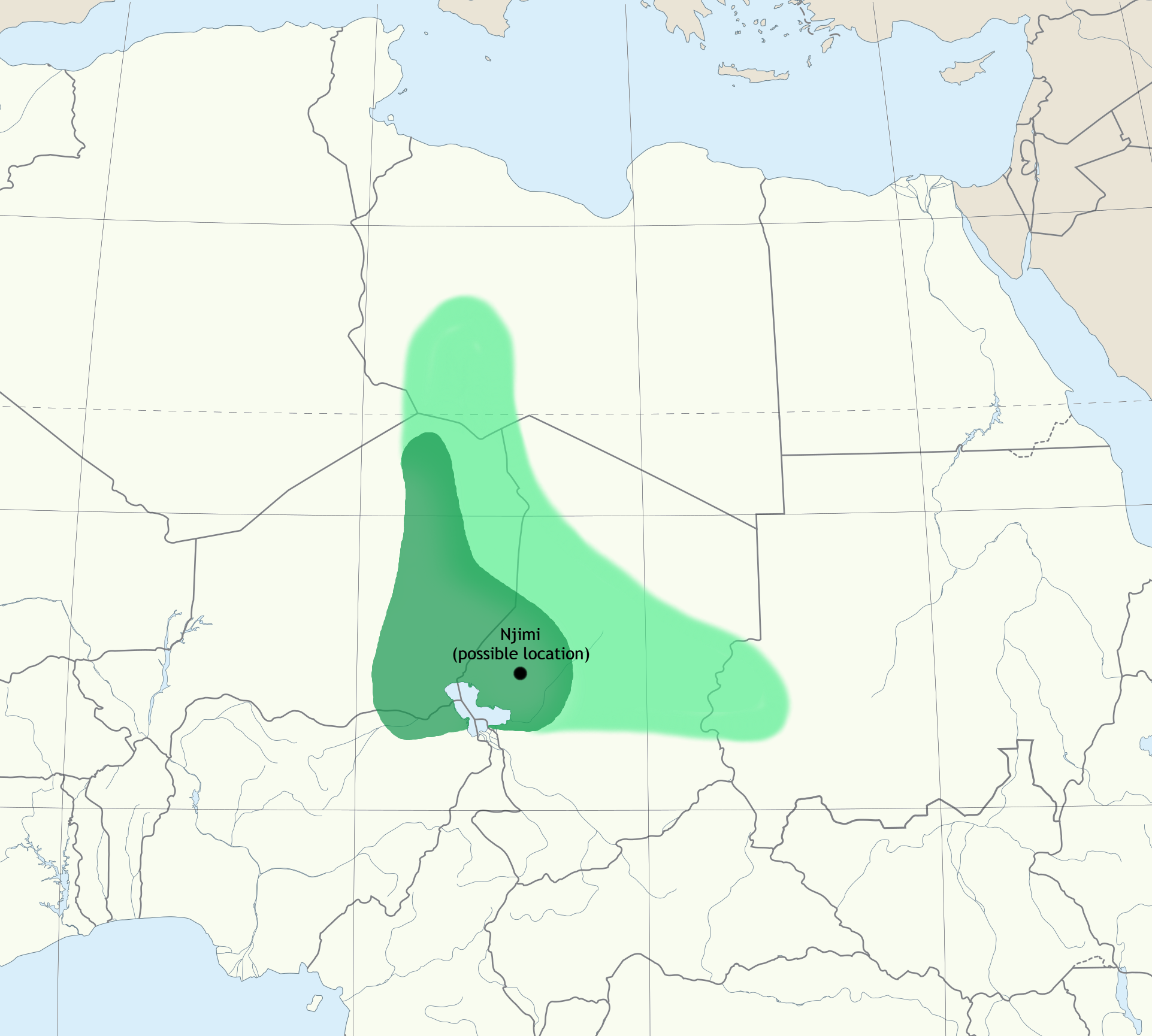
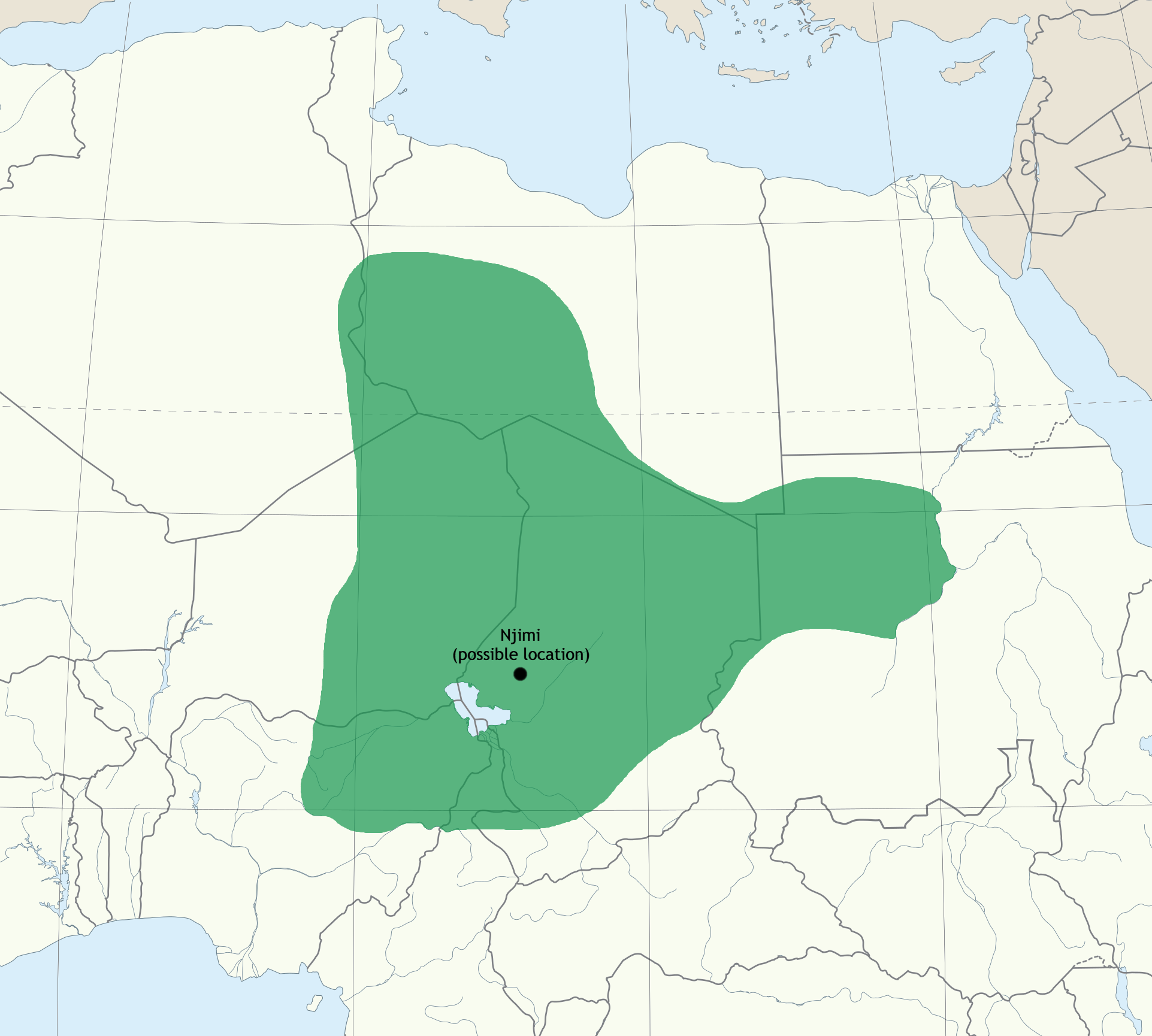
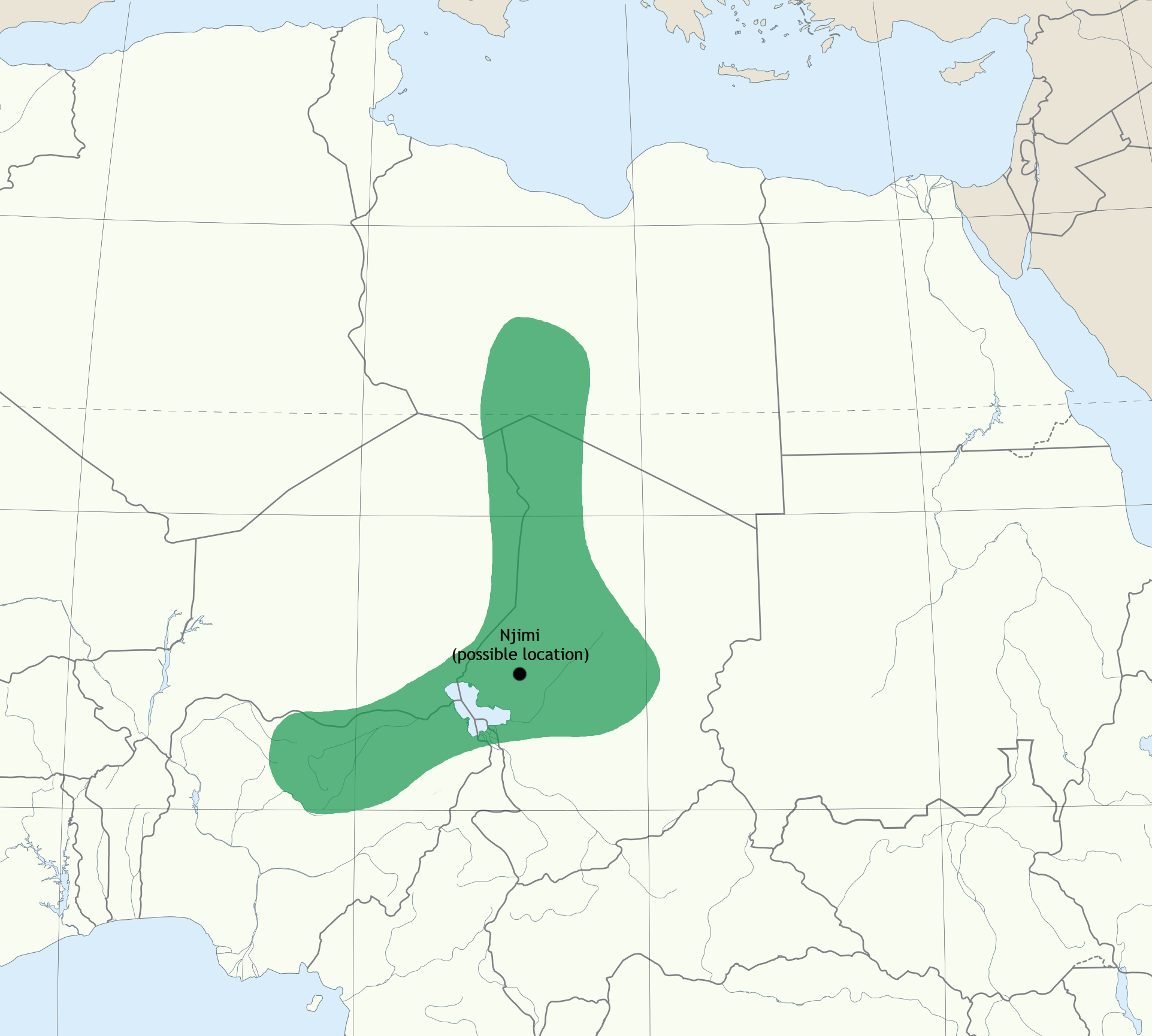
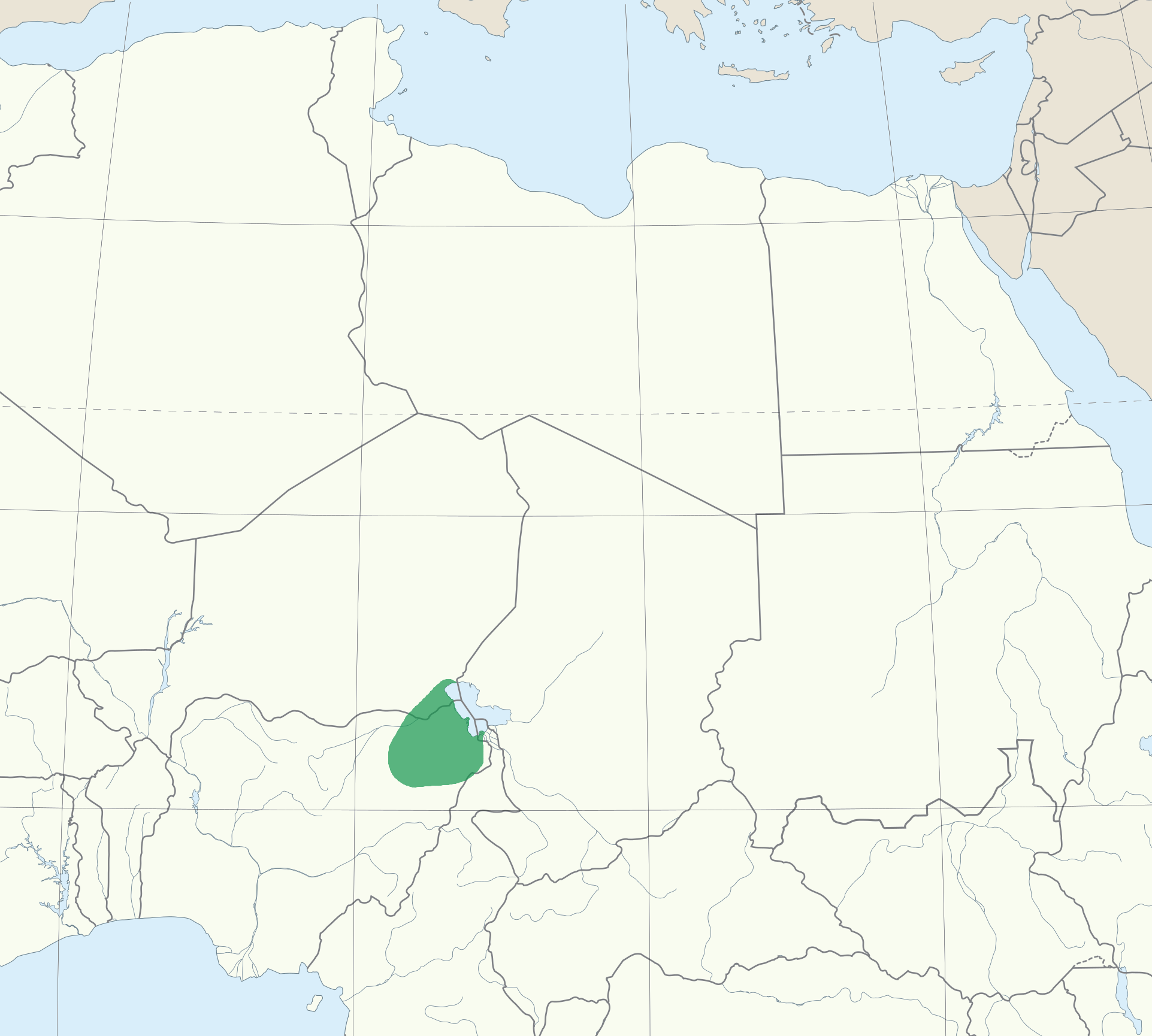
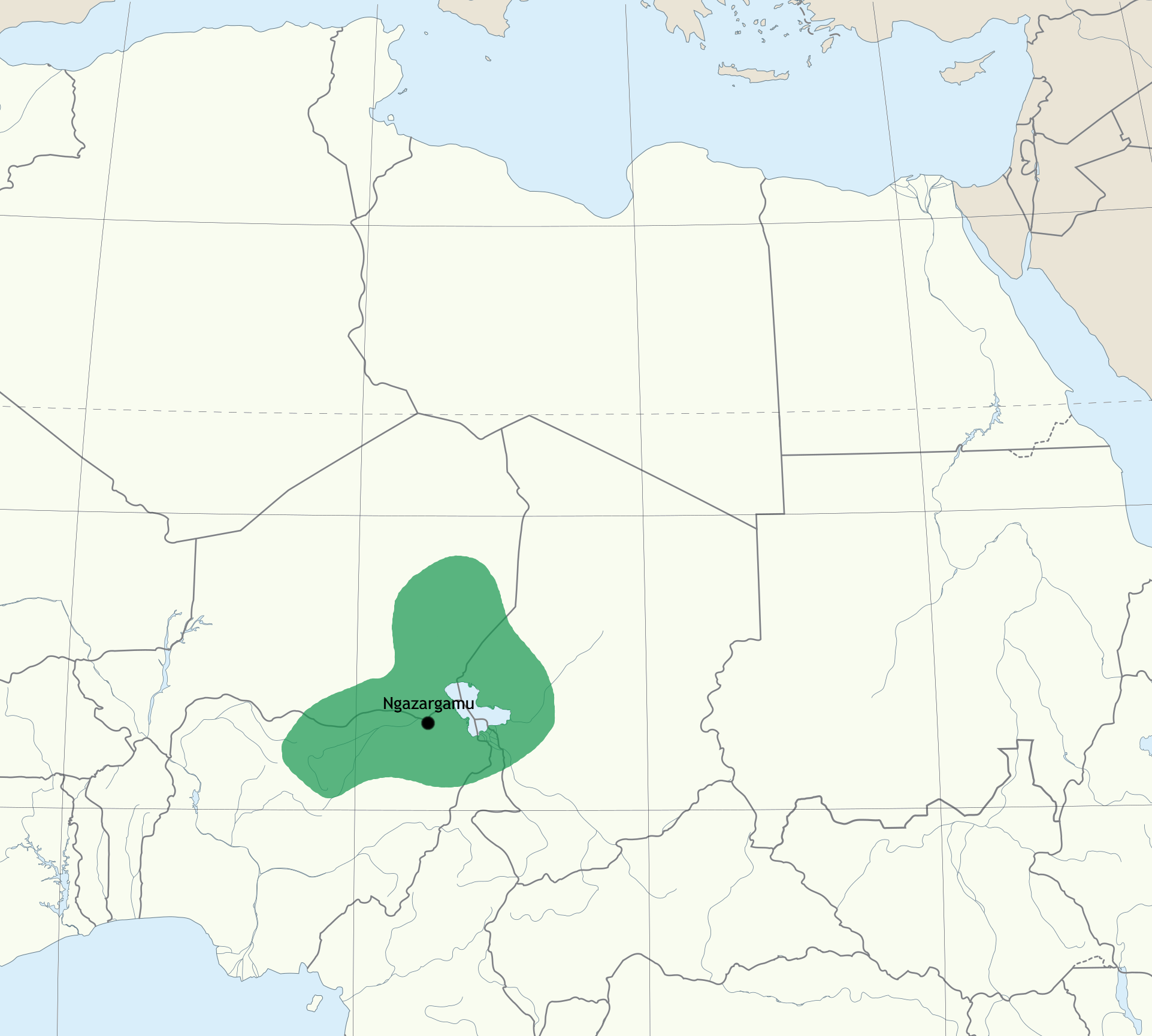
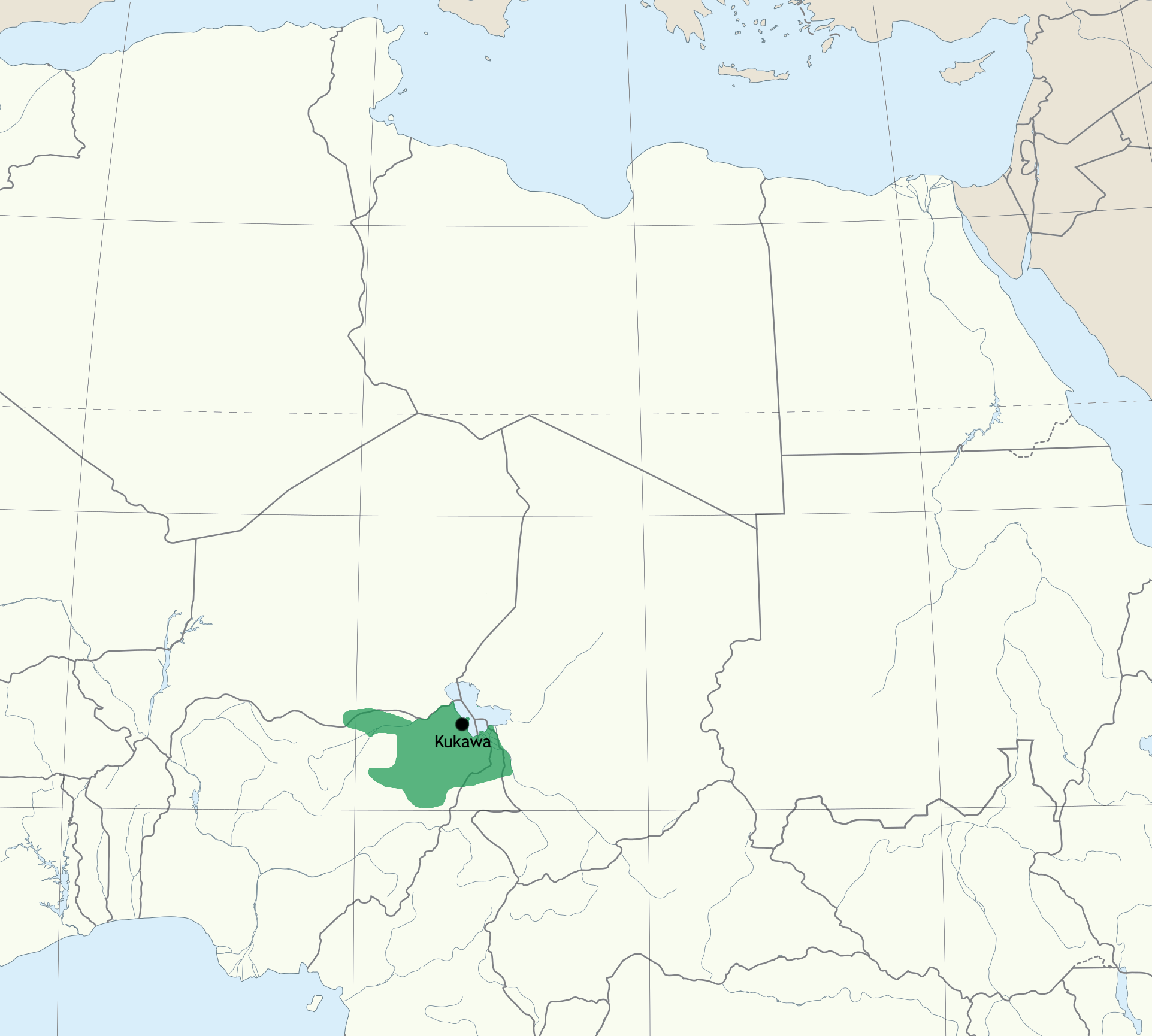
- Capital: Njimi (c. 700 (Note: Njimi is typically identified as the original capital of Kanem. Muhammad al-Idrisi (12th century) records that the original capital was instead at a town called Manan. Dewière (2024) suggests that Manan might have been the original capital until the conversion to Islam and the rise of the Sayfawa dynasty in the 11th century, whereafter the capital was moved to Njimi.)–1380); None (Note: Njimi was captured by the Bilala in the 14th century. The empire was re-centered in Bornu but lacked a permanent capital for about a century until the foundation of Ngazargamu. The court of the mai constantly moved from one site to another in this time and little information survives on the specific sites used by different mais.) (c. 1380–1472); Ngazargamu (c. 1472–1809); None (Note: Ngazargamu was destroyed by the Fulani in 1808 and was briefly reoccupied before being fully abandoned by mai Dunama IX Lefiami in 1809. Dunama retreated east but did not decide upon a permanent capital, instead moving between locations every few months. A new capital, Kafela, was established in 1813 by mai Muhammad IX Ngileruma.) (1809–1813); Kafela (1813–1846); Kukawa (1846–1893); Dikwa (1893–1902)
- Common languages: Daza, Kanembu, Kanuri, Tebu, Teda, Zaghawa, Arabic
- Religion: Traditional religion (c. 700–1070); Ibadi Islam (c. 1070–1085); Sunni Islam (c. 1085–1902)
- Government: Monarchy
- Mai
  - c. 700: Susam (first)
  - 1846: Ali V Minargema (last)
- Shehu
  - 1814–1837: Muhammad al-Kanemi (de facto first)
  - 1837/1846 (Note: De facto ruler since the death of Muhammad al-Kanemi in 1837, de jure ruler after the death of Ali V Minargema in 1846.)–1881: Umar Kura (de jure first)
  - 1900–1902 (Note: Continued to serve as non-sovereign shehu of British Bornu until 1922.): Abubakar Garbai (last)
- Historical era: Middle Ages, Modern era
  - Founded in Kanem: c. 700
  - Conversion to Islam: 11th century
  - Loss of Kanem to the Bilala, re-centered in Bornu: c. 1380
  - Recovery of Kanem: 16th century
  - Overthrow of the Sayfawa dynasty: 1846
  - Rabih az-Zubayr's occupation: 1893–1900
  - Colonisation by France and Britain: 1902
- Currency: Copper, cowrie shells, cotton strips, coined silver
Succeeded by
French Chad
Northern Nigeria Protectorate
Kamerun

The Kanem–Bornu Empire (Note: See the Nomenclature section for other names.) was an empire based around Lake Chad that once ruled areas which are now part of Nigeria, Niger, Cameroon, Libya, Algeria, Sudan, and Chad. The empire was sustained by the prosperous trans-Saharan trade and was one of the oldest and longest-lived empires in world history and especially in African history.

The early history of the Kanem–Bornu Empire is poorly known. The empire is believed to have been founded around the year 700, though later and earlier dates have also been proposed. The Duguwa dynasty ruled the empire from their capital Njimi in the Kanem region (in modern-day Chad) and used the ruling title mai. In the 11th century, the empire converted to Islam and the Duguwa were replaced with the Sayfawa dynasty. The Kanem-based empire was brought to its zenith by the 13th-century mai Dunama II Dibalemi. The empire exerted considerable control over Saharan trade routes and exported salt, ivory, slaves, and animal products. The salt industry was particularly prosperous, with the empire able to provide salt across the surrounding region.

Economic factors and conflict with the Bilala people caused the empire to lose Kanem in the 14th century. Mai Umar I Idrismi re-centered the empire in the Bornu region (in modern-day Nigeria), formerly a tributary state. A century of political instability followed, until mai Ali I Gaji founded Ngazargamu as a new permanent capital. Although Kanem was later recovered by mai Idris III Katagarmabe, scholars sometimes divide the Kanem–Bornu Empire into an earlier Kanem Empire and later Bornu Empire. The Bornu-based empire was brought to the peak of its power and influence under mai Idris IV Alooma in the late 16th century. Although Kanem–Bornu remained powerful for long thereafter, the empire began a slow but steady decline in the 17th century due to changing economic patterns and environmental conditions, and conflicts with various neighbors.

The empire nearly fell during the Fula jihads in the early 19th century, which saw the center of power in the region shift west to the Sokoto Caliphate. In the aftermath of the jihads, the Sayfawa dynasty was supplanted by the al-Kanemi dynasty, who ruled with the title shehu (sheikh). In 1893, Kanem–Bornu was conquered by the Sudanese warlord Rabih az-Zubayr, who transformed the empire into a brutal military regime. Subsequent civil unrest was exploited by France and Britain. Although the al-Kanemi dynasty was restored in 1900, they governed under colonial suzerainty. The empire's territories were incorporated into the French, British, and German colonial empires in 1902. Remnants of the Kanem–Bornu regime survive today in the form of the non-sovereign Borno and Dikwa emirates, two traditional states in Borno State, Nigeria.

== Nomenclature ==
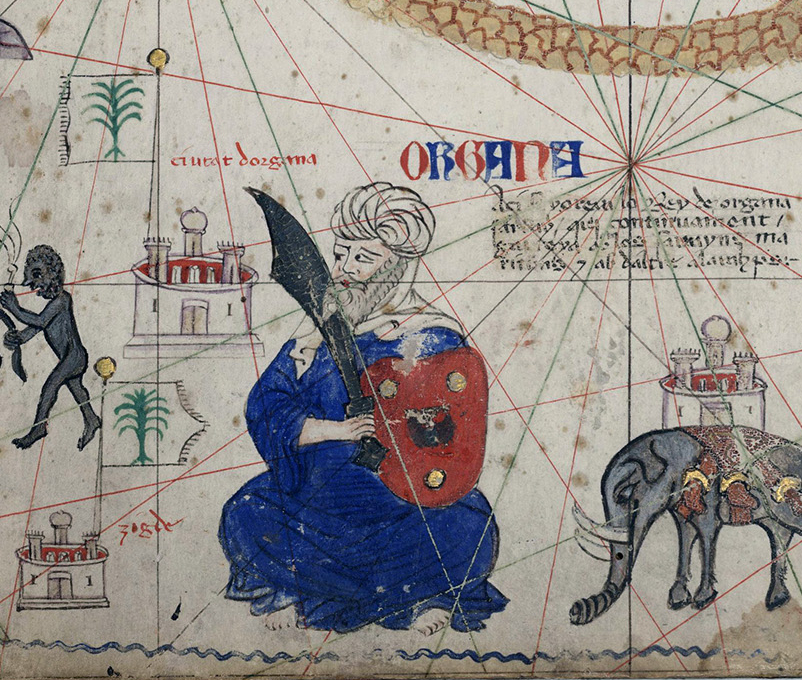
"Organa" and its ruler in the 14th-century European Catalan Atlas. Organa has historically been identified with Kanem–Bornu but other candidates have also been proposed.

The name Kanem–Bornu Empire (or Kanem–Borno Empire) is a historiographical name used to cover the entire history of the state ruled by the Duguwa, Sayfawa, and al-Kanemi dynasties. Kanem–Bornu was not a native or contemporary name used by the empire. The name is an amalgamation of the two main central regions of the empire over the course of its history: Kanem in modern-day Chad and Bornu (or Borno) in modern-day Nigeria. Since the empire rarely exerted direct control over both regions and its center was always based in only one of them, the name is somewhat anachronistic. Modern scholars sometimes use the loss of Kanem and re-centering of the empire in Bornu in the 14th century as the dividing point between an early Kanem Empire and later Bornu Empire.

Kanem was the native name of the original core territory of the empire. The name might derive from the word anem, which still carries the meaning "south" in the Teda and Kanuri languages. From the 9th to 11th centuries, foreign Arabic sources identify the state as the "kingdom of the Zaghāwa" and as "Kānem". The name Bornu or Borno only appears in sources from the 14th century onwards, connected to the new core territory west of Lake Chad, and eventually came to function as the native name for the entire state. Of the two spellings, Borno is more correct since it more accurately reflects how the name is pronounced in the Kanuri language. The spelling Bornu remains common in historical treatments but is sometimes regarded as a colonial spelling. When European colonial powers encountered the state in the 19th century, they referred to it as the Empire of Borno (Empire du Bornou in French).

Referring to Kanem–Bornu as an empire has its root in 19th and 20th-century eurocentric historiography and serves to stress the longevity and importance of the state. The Historian Rémi Dewière has suggested that the state should instead be called a sultanate (e.g. Kanem Sultanate, Borno Sultanate) to "decolonize the history of Islamic Africa".

Medieval European maps sometimes feature a kingdom in Kanem–Bornu's general location referred to as Organa or the Regnum Organa (Kingdom of Organa), which has traditionally been identified with Kanem–Bornu. Modern scholars generally treat Organa as unidentified, with Kanem–Bornu, Ife, and Ghana considered potential identifications. The name Organa and its association with Western-style heraldic symbols (often a palm tree) is indicative of medieval Europe knowing next to nothing about sub-Saharan Africa.

Alternative names to Kanem–Bornu Empire sometimes used by modern scholars include Sayfawa Empire (after the longest-lived ruling dynasty), and Kanuri Empire or Kanembu Empire (after dominant ethnic groups).

== History ==
=== Medieval period (c. 700–1472) ===
==== Origin and early history (c. 700–1000) ====
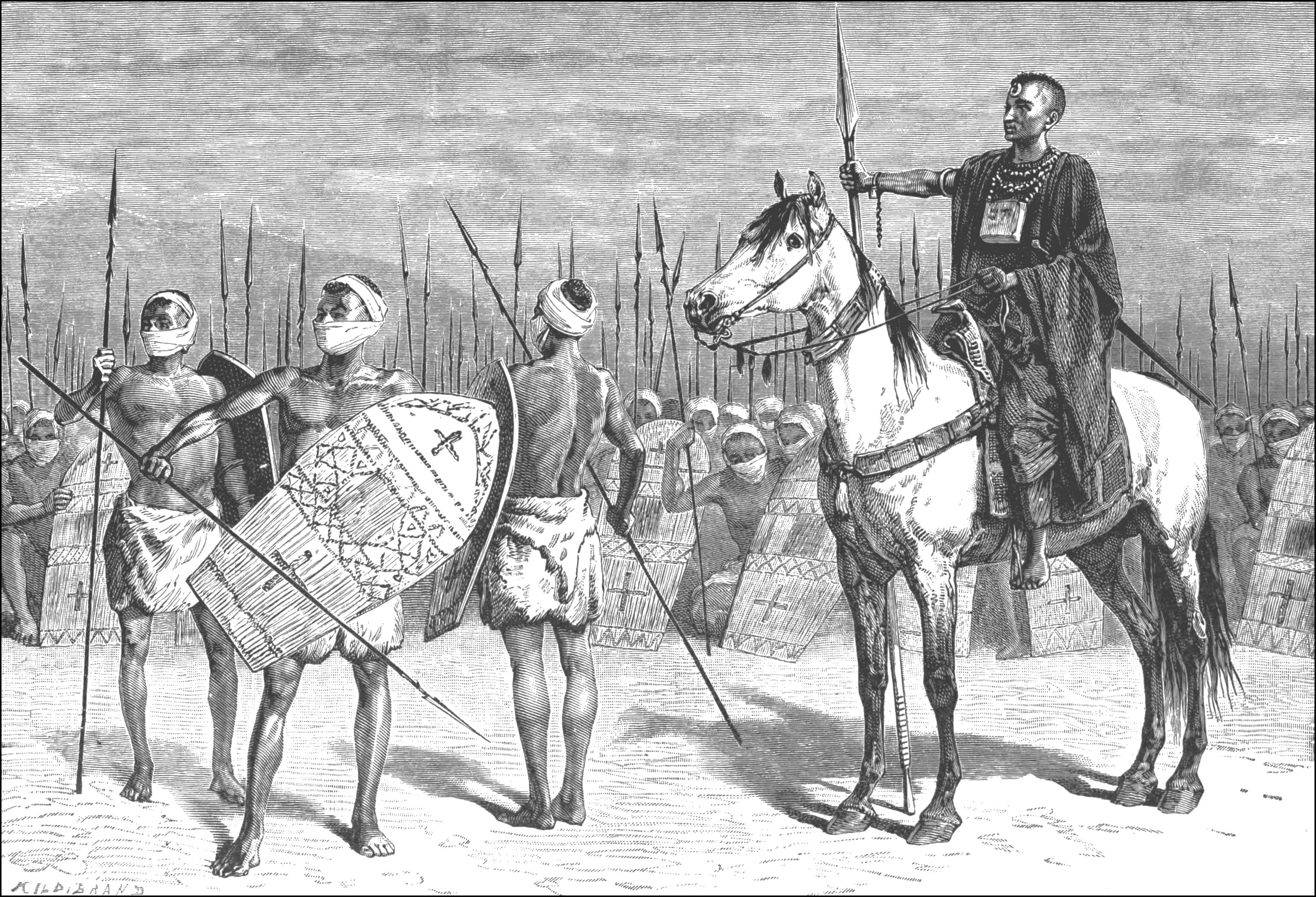
Kanembu warriors and a chief, by Élisée Reclus (1892)

The early history of Kanem is poorly known and subject to debate. The empire is believed to have originated in the lands between Lake Chad and the Bahr el Ghazal River, with a core territory in the region of Kanem (northeast of Lake Chad). Lake Chad was positioned along key trade routes, ideally situated between Egypt and Sudan in the east, various West African states in the west, and the Sahara Desert in the north.

Humans lived in the inner Chad Basin at least as far back as the 6th millennium BCE. The region is known to have acquired iron-smelting technology by the 5th century BCE and experienced increased agricultural activity around that time as well as the formation of permanent villages. By the 5th century CE, the people in Kanem had acquired the camel, either from North Africa or the Nile Valley. The appearance of the camel is believed to have facilitated the rich trans-Saharan trade, though archaeological evidence of this trade in pre-Islamic times is next to non-existent. Control of this trade led to the rise of stratified societies which eventually coalesced into kingdoms. One scholar, Dierk Lange, has proposed that Kanem's establishment was connected to refugees from the fall of the Neo-Assyrian Empire in the 7th century BCE, though this hypothesis has been criticised for lack of evidence and has found no acceptance among other researchers.

The process of state formation in Kanem is in large part unknown. The history of the Kanem Empire may go back as far as the 8th century and perhaps even earlier. The empire's foundation is typically dated to c. 700, though some place it as late as c. 900 or as early as c. 600. The earliest known written record of Kanem comes from the Arab geographer Al-Ya'qubi in 872. The empire's first capital was probably Njimi, east of Lake Chad, and its rulers assumed the title mai. The site of Njimi has never been satisfactorily located, despite attempts to find it since the mid-19th century. Although only limited surveys of the original core of the empire have been conducted, the capital may have been built of impermanent materials. Some later Arab sources suggest that it was a "city of tents" in its original incarnation. Archaeological evidence from Koro Toro suggests that the region surrounding Kanem saw a considerable development of iron production between c. 500 and c. 1000, the formative centuries of Kanem.

The empire was probably founded by the Zaghawa people, pastoralists from the Ennedi Plateau, but grew to encompass several other ethnic groups, such as the Toubou people in the north. The empire consisted of various groups, including nomadic pastoralists, agriculturalists, and people accustomed to iron-working and horsemanship. The different groups eventually gave rise to the Kanembu people, who speak the Nilo-Saharan Kanembu language. The early empire grew wealthy and powerful through the export of slaves in exchange for horses, and the raiding of its neighbors.

The early Kanem Empire was ruled by the Duguwa dynasty, an aristocratic group who may have chosen mais among themselves. Arab sources connect the Duguwa to the Zaghawa. It has also been suggested that they were Kanembu. The modern-day Haddad people in Chad may also have some historical connection to the Duguwa dynasty. (Note: Haddad is a name of Chadian Arabic origin, the Kanembu-language name for the Haddad is Duu. The 19th-century German explorer Gustav Nachtigal called them Danoa and referred to them as the "oldest" inhabitants of Kanem. On etymological grounds, Dierk Lange suggested a connection to the Duguwa in 1977. Ethnographic studies on the subject are lacking.) Later legend, reflecting a desire to connect Kanem to the greater Islamic world, claimed that the Duguwa were descendants of migrants from the Arabian peninsula, who intermarried with the indigenous people around Lake Chad. Later tradition identifies mai Susam as the first ruler of the empire. The Duguwa dynasty gets its name from the empire's third ruler, Dugu (or Duku).

The political history of the Kanem–Bornu Empire is largely reconstructed through the girgam, the empire's royal chronicle. The girgam was preserved through oral tradition before transcriptions by European scholars in the mid-19th century. The girgam is not entirely reliable since it was preserved orally, incorporates some Biblical figures in its early sections, and contains some contradictions between different versions. There is however a large degree of agreement across different versions of the girgam as to the names of rulers and the lengths of their reigns.

==== Conversion to Islam (c. 1000–1380) ====
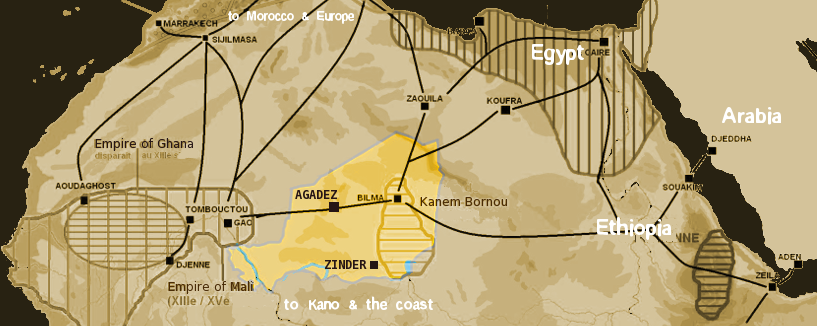
Map of medieval trade routes in the area around Kanem and Bornu, circa 1400

Islam reached modern-day Chad already in the time of the Umayyad Caliphate (661–750), when Arab raiders reached Fezzan and the Tibesti Mountains. The religion was probably introduced to Kanem from the north by either the Toubou people or trans-Saharan traders. Islam was probably an important influence within the empire from as early as the mid-8th or 9th century. Portions of the population may have early on converted to Ibadi Islam, as happened in Gao to the northwest. The early rulers of Kanem approached Islam carefully since they perceived the religion to contain some dangerous ideas, such as the equality of all believers before God. In traditional local religions, the ruler was often accorded superhuman powers and unlimited authority.

The first Muslim ruler of Kanem was the 11th-century mai Hu (or Hawwa), who may have been a woman. Hu's successor, Selema I, may have been overthrown in the second half of the 11th century by mai Hummay, who established the new Sayfawa dynasty. Hu and Selema may have been Ibadi Muslim, whereas Hummay's dynasty was Sunni Muslim. The Sayfawa were Kanembu in origin but claimed descent from the Yemeni noble Sayf ibn Dī Yazan, a well-known legendary hero in the medieval Islamic world. Sayf and Susam were identified as the same figure in later Kanem–Bornu tradition. Other African dynasties of this time sometimes made similar claims to Arab origin as a source of prestige.

Later tradition credited the conversion of the Sayfawa dynasty to a scholar named Muhammad bin Mani, from whom many later Kanemi and Bornuan scholars and religious officials claimed descent. Following the conversion to Islam by the rulers, conversions also increased among the general populace. Since Islam did not permit the enslavement of Muslims, it was not in the interest of the mais to force conversion beyond certain limits, so as to continue to facilitate the need for slaves in local and trans-Saharan markets. The trans-Saharan trade sustained the empire, which was able to levy taxes and duties on trade goods. Through the trade passing through the empire, Kanem had access to most of the technology and knowledge of its time and could flourish and expand.

Information from the Akhbār al-zamān, written between the late 10th to 11th century, states that Kanem by then was already a "vast and large" kingdom that was partly on the Nile and at war with Nubians. Kanem transitioned into a true empire through expansion to the Kaouar oases in the 11th century. Several archaeological sites have been identified in the oases, remains of former settlements, though they are yet to be excavated. It is believed that the northernmost settlements catered to travelers whereas the southern oasis settlements were focused on the salt trade. Through control of the trade routes to the north, the Kanem Empire exported ivory, slaves, and animal products. Foreign products, including weapons, books, beads, and cloth, were imported into the empire. In the 11th century, regulated taxation of the farmers around the capital at Njimi started to replace the previous patterns of nomad raiding and extortion.

Increasing Islamisation of Kanem is evident from the 11th century onwards and Kanem had developed into a literate society by the 12th century, when the scribes of the empire are recorded to have developed an original script style, the barnāwī. In the 13th century, a ruler of Kanem is recorded to have gone on Hajj to Mecca. Shortly afterwards, the 13th-century mai Dunama II Dibalemi is recorded to have "opened" the mune, (Note: The sources are not clear what the mune was or what is meant by "opening" it. Most literary sources (16th–19th century) suggest that the mune was similar to the Ark of the Covenant, being some sort of covered container that held commandments which defined the relationship between the mai and God. Dunama II Dibalemi opening the mune was widely perceived as a negative act and as something that contributed to the empire's troubles in following centuries. The mune has also been suggested to have been the focal point of a pre-Islamic cult; Dierk Lange has stated that it could have been a statue of Amun obtained from Meroë centuries prior, which Dunama unwrapped from some veiling.) an important religious artefact of unclear nature. Dunama II brought Kanem to the zenith of its power. He commanded a cavalry of 40,000 horsemen and extended his rule as far as the Fezzan. Wars against the Sao, southwest of Lake Chad, were justified in the name of a jihad, and captives were sold as slaves in exchange for further horses from North Africa. Pilgrimages to Mecca became a common occurrence, so much so that a hostel for pilgrims and students from Kanem was founded in Cairo. In 1257, the mai sent a giraffe as a gift to Muhammad I al-Mustansir of the Hafsid dynasty in Ifriqiya.

In the mid-13th century, Kanem ruled the Fezzan as far as Waddan.

==== Era of Instability (c. 1380–1472) ====
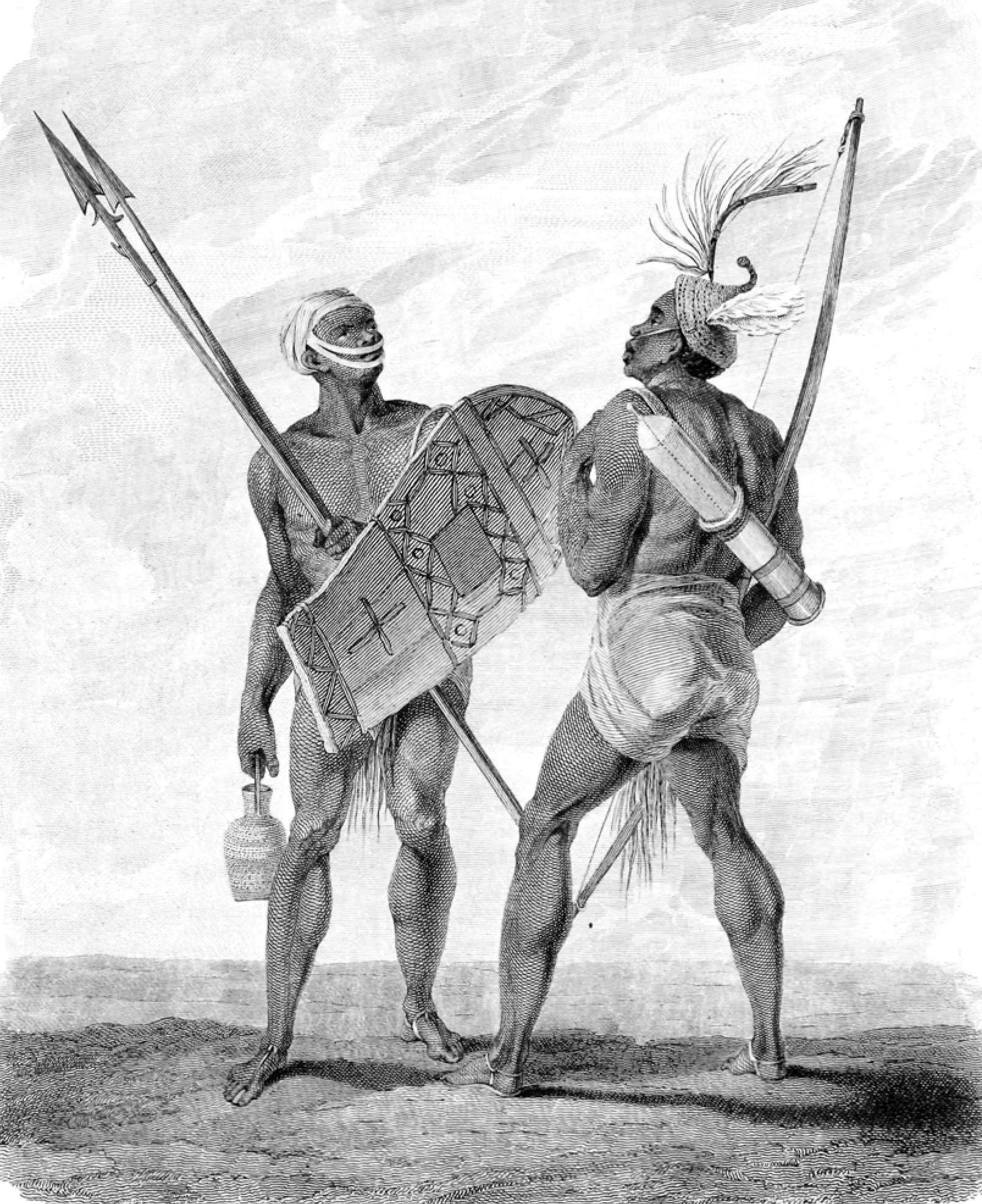
A Kanembu spearman and a Munga bowman, by Edward Francis Finden (1826)

In the 13th century, the mais came into conflict with the Bilala people, who lived within the empire. The Bilala leaders may have been a cadet branch of the Sayfawa dynasty. Conflict may have been motivated by the increased Islamisation alienating the more traditionalist Bilala. Kanem was at the same time becoming overstretched, suffering from pastures becoming overgrazed and dried out, lacking the natural resources required for a state of its size, and having become too dependent on the personal authority of the mai. The Medieval Warm Period also contributed to the drying up of Lake Chad, the heart of the empire. The empire began to be plagued by increasing internal and external conflict, as well as wars of succession.

The 14th century saw the beginning of the so-called "Era of Instability", plagued by both internal and external conflict. In the 14th century, around the year 1380, the Bilala were able to oust the Sayfawa from power in Kanem and capture Njimi. Imperial control of the lands east of Lake Chad was terminated, and the Bilala would rule there independently until the 16th century. The rulers of the Bilala declared themselves sultans, established a proper aristocracy, and posed a serious political alternative to the Sayfawa in the region surrounding Lake Chad. Mamluk chancery manuals from the time accord the Bilala the same diplomatic status as the Sayfawa.

Mai Umar I Idrismi relocated across Lake Chad to Bornu in the west, a former tributary territory established in the 13th century. The Sayfawa quickly regrouped in Bornu, re-establishing a powerful kingdom there, and the mais continued to rule as they had in Kanem. Intermarriages between the Kanembu people and the local Sao may have given rise to the modern-day Kanuri people, who are often linked to the Kanem–Bornu Empire. The empire continued to be plagued by political instability in the form of repeated civil wars between descendants of mai Dawud Nikalemi ("Dawudids") and mai Idris I Nikalemi ("Idrisids"). Between about 1390 and 1470, no less than 15 mais occupied the throne, ruling in rapid succession. The civil wars impacted regions as far away from the imperial core as Hausaland and Darfur through economic upheaval and migrations of refugees.

After the fall of Njimi, the empire lacked a permanent capital for about a century, with the court of the mai constantly moving from one site to another. Very little information survives on the movements and locations of the mais in this period. Prior to the foundation of the permanent capital of Ngazargamu c. 1472, the mai had apparently resided at a site called Garu Kime for seven years and seven months. This site may correspond to modern-day Monguno.

=== Modern period (1472–1893) ===
==== Imperial apex (1472–1650) ====
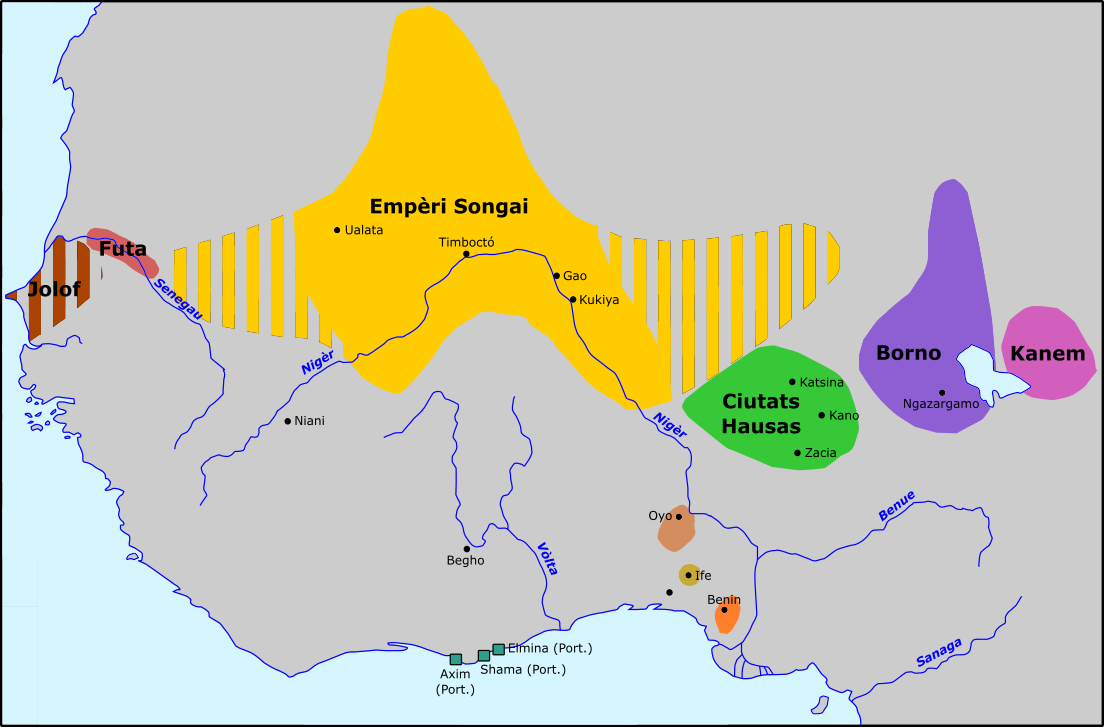
West Africa in the 15th century. The rise of the Songhai Empire (yellow) was a considerable threat to Bornu (dark purple). Kanem (light purple) remained autonomous under the Bilala but was reduced to a vassal state in the early 1500s.

The Idrisid mai Ali I Gaji emerged victorious from the civil wars of the 14th and 15th century. Adapting to the more urbanised society of Bornu, the empire became centered on a network of walled settlements that formed the core of its power. In c. 1472, Ali founded the empire's first substantial capital city, Ngazargamu, on the shores of the Yobe River. Ngazargamu served as a firm basis of political authority and was ideally positioned at the southern terminus of the trans-Saharan trade routes, and closer to emerging trade centers in Hausaland than previous capitals. The city became the focal point of the central Sudan region for the next three centuries. After the foundation of Ngazargamu, some of the mais went so far as to call themselves caliphs. Indigenous practices and beliefs continued to persist even at this date, such as the mai customarily appearing behind a veil or screen.

The empire expanded in the 15th and 16th centuries. The mais fought against various neighboring powers, such as the Hausa city-states and Kotoko principalities in the south and the Wandala along the Mandara Mountains. The most formidable enemy to arise in this period was the Songhai Empire in the west, which competed for influence over Hausaland and sometimes raided Bornuan territory. Kanem itself was reconquered by Ali I's son mai Idris III Katagarmabe in the early 1500s, though the center of the empire continued to remain in Bornu, probably because the area was more productive agriculturally and better suited to raise cattle. Idris sealed peace between the Sayfawa and Bilala through a diplomatic marriage and the Bilala were allowed to continue to govern Kanem as vassals. In the west, Idris III failed to conquer the Kingdom of Kano but was recognised as the kingdom's suzerain and was paid tribute. By the reign of Idris III's son mai Muhammad VI Aminami, the empire had fully regained its former prominence in the trans-Saharan trade. Through the political influence of Bornu, the Kanuri language spread over a wide area. So-called Old Kanembu was also a prominent language, though reserved for Islamic scholarly studies.

The empire experienced some decline in the 1550s and 1560s due to famine and revolts against imperial suzerainty. In the 1570s, the threat posed by the Songhai Empire led mai Idris IV Alooma to seek an alliance with the Ottoman Empire. Bornu had been in contact with the Ottomans since the Ottoman conquest of Tripoli (1551), and Ottoman mercenaries had been enlisted in various local conflicts. Prior to Alooma's reign, Ottoman firearms and tactical superiority had helped with conquests in the south and west of Bornu. Through diplomacy with Ottoman sultan Murad III, Alooma secured Turkish muskets, as well as military training by Turkish instructors for the Bornuan army, and had renewed their treaty with sultan Murad III in 1589 under Husayn Pāsha of Tripoli. Alooma was an ambitious ruler, who led several military campaigns and brought the empire to the height of its power. Although the actual territorial expansion of the state under Alooma was relatively minor, the subjugation of internal non-Muslim groups contributed to consolidating the state and long-distance diplomacy encouraged trade and cultural development.

By the end of the 16th century, Bornu's sphere of influence extended from Hausaland to the Bahr el Ghazal River, and from south of Lake Chad to the Fezzan. The collapse of the Songhai Empire in 1591 and the decline of cities such as Timbuktu and Djenné made Bornu the new center of Islamic learning in central Africa, playing a crucial role in the local intellectual ecosystem. Alooma's reign was followed by a period of stabilisation in the early 17th century. Islam spread further into rural areas of the empire during this time and Sufism experienced a surge in popularity.

==== Decline (1650–1807) ====
Map of the Kanem–Bornu Empire in 1650

The empire began to experience slow economic decline as early as the 15th century because of the increase in trade via the Atlantic Ocean. In the 17th century, Bornu's control over the trans-Saharan trade was increasingly challenged. Ottoman officials in Tripolitania periodically attempted to increase their own influence over the trade, sometimes creating agreements with Bornu and sometimes attempting to establish their own monopoly. The empire also came into conflict with the Tuareg over control of the trans-Saharan trade routes. Under Tuareg pressure, the empire slowly lost the Kaouar oases and its control over the trade routes and was forced to establish defensive military outposts along its northern, western, and eastern borders.

Several new neighboring states fought to increase their influence to the detriment of Bornu and imperial vassal states came under repeated attacks. In around 1630, The Wadai Sultanate drove the Bilala out of Kanem, forcing the empire to militarily intervene in order to secure the eastern side of Lake Chad. The Bilala were forced to flee east, re-establishing themselves around Lake Fitri. Bornu established new buffer states in the north and west to protect against the growing power of Kano and the Sultanate of Agadez. The imperial core was consolidated through the annexation of several frontier states, such as the Kotoko city-states. Despite military buildup, the empire abandoned certain military innovations. By the end of the 17th century, Bornuan armies had for instance ceased to use gunpowder weapons. Despite its declining power, the empire continued to be the main military power in the Chad Basin.

The Little Ice Age (16th–19th centuries) heavily impacted Lake Chad and the surrounding region, causing a drought while regions further south experienced increased fertility. Although Lake Chad reached its largest size since the 13th century, the lands surrounding the lake were rendered extremely dry, likely contributing to large-scale emigration of Bornuans. Trans-Saharan trade continued to be prosperous through the 17th century but new alternate trade roads were also established by powers such as the Hausa city-states and Wadai. Trade eventually decline to such a level that large empires could no longer be sustained, giving rise to smaller kingdoms and political chaos.

Tuareg invasions and a famine in the latter half of the 17th century quickened the decline of the empire. Imperial expansion and military power stagnated in the 18th century. In the early 18th century, mai Hamdan Dunamami repeatedly fought against the neighboring Mandara Kingdom. A few decades later, under mai Ali IV Kalirgima, the conflict with the Mandara Kingdom culminated in an 1781 invasion of Bornu and the defeat of the imperial army.

==== Fula jihads and the shehus (1807–1893) ====
Political map of West Africa c. 1875, including Kanem–Bornu and the Sokoto Caliphate

In the late 18th and early 19th century, a wave of Islamic revival swept through western and central Africa, partly motivated by competition between nomadic (largely Fulani) and settled populations for land. From 1804 onwards, the religious leader Usman dan Fodio began a series of military campaigns (the Fula jihads), at first against the various states in Hausaland. The campaigns resulted in Usman being named ʾAmīr al-Muʾminīn by his followers, and the establishment of the vast Sokoto Caliphate. The rise of the Sokoto Caliphate shifted the cultural, economic, and political center of the region to the west and abruptly ended the traditional pre-eminent position of the Kanem–Bornu Empire. Due to internal strife, losses against Mandara, and perhaps a recent plague, Bornu was particularly vulnerable to attacks at the time. The jihad had reached the empire by 1807. The Fulani denounced the people of Bornu as inadequate Muslims and captured most of the western provinces of the empire.

In 1808, under mai Ahmad Alimi, the Fulani captured and destroyed Ngazargamu. Much of the imperial core had by that time fallen into the hands of the invaders. In the same year, the local Islamic scholar Muhammad al-Amin al-Kanemi was drawn into local conflicts with the Fulani in Bornu and managed to defeat some Fulani troops in the region of Ngala. Al-Kanemi's victory garnered him the attention of the new mai Dunama IX Lefiami, who summoned him to assist in the defense of the empire. Under al-Kanemi's leadership, the empire, despite its decline, proved strong enough to resist the Fulani invaders. Al-Kanemi received a large personal fiefdom, centered at Ngurno, and organised a large slave-heavy cavalry army, supported by Kanembu spearmen and Arab light cavalry. He also led a propaganda campaign against the Fulani jihadists, questioning what right they had to wage holy war against Bornu. The Fulani were driven away from the empire and mai Dunama was restored to power. Dunama briefly reoccupied what remained of Ngazargamu but soon abandoned the former capital in 1809 since it was too close to the Fulani frontier. To the ire of his people, Dunama retreated east but could not decide on a new site for a permanent capital, instead only spending a few months in any one given place.

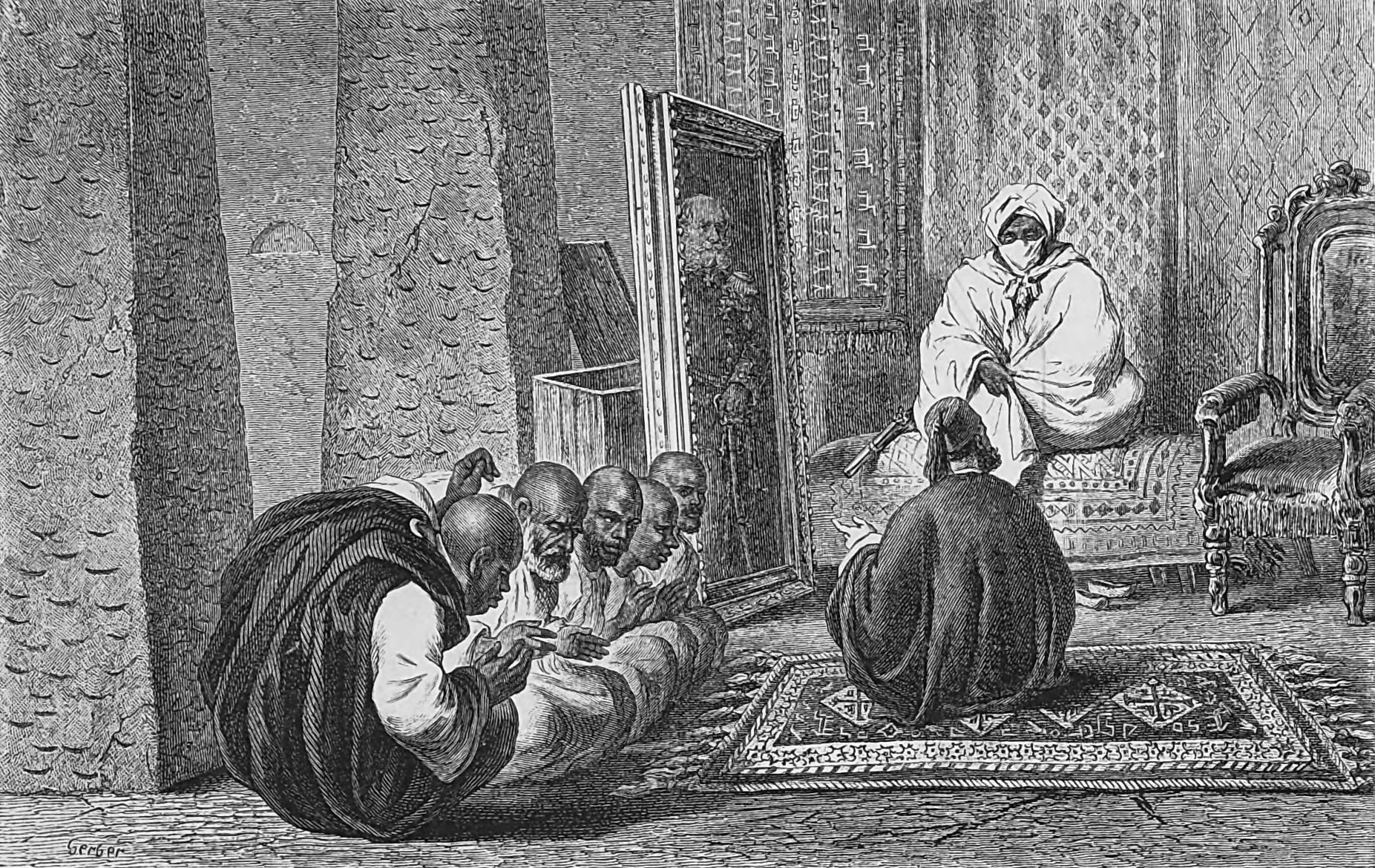
Shehu Umar Kura receives gifts from Wilhelm I of the German Empire

Court intrigue, partly related to the great power awarded to al-Kanemi, led to Dunama being deposed by his courtiers in 1811, replaced with mai Muhammad IX Ngileruma. Under Muhammad Ngileruma, a new imperial capital was established at Kafela, close to al-Kanemi's seat at Ngurno. Al-Kanemi supported Dunama's restoration in 1814 but then began to act more independently. Al-Kanemi became the de facto ruler of the empire and centralised power under himself. The mai was continued to serve as a nominal ruler for a few decades. In 1814, al-Kanemi assumed the style of shehu (sheikh) and established a new seat, Kukawa, which grew into one of the great metropolises of sub-Saharan Africa. In 1817, Dunama plotted to eliminate al-Kanemi but was himself killed and replaced with the young puppet mai Ibrahim IV Lefiami. At the death of al-Kanemi in 1837, he was succeeded as shehu by his son Umar Kura. Umar faced some resistance from both associates of his father and from the puppet mai, but quickly took power. Ibrahim later tried to depose Umar through a civil war but was killed in 1846. Ibrahim was briefly succeeded by his son, mai Ali V Minargema, who was also defeated and killed in battle. The thousand-year office of mai came to an end and Umar and his successors assumed de jure power over the empire, though still with the title of shehu. Kafela was destroyed and Kukawa became the empire's formal capital.

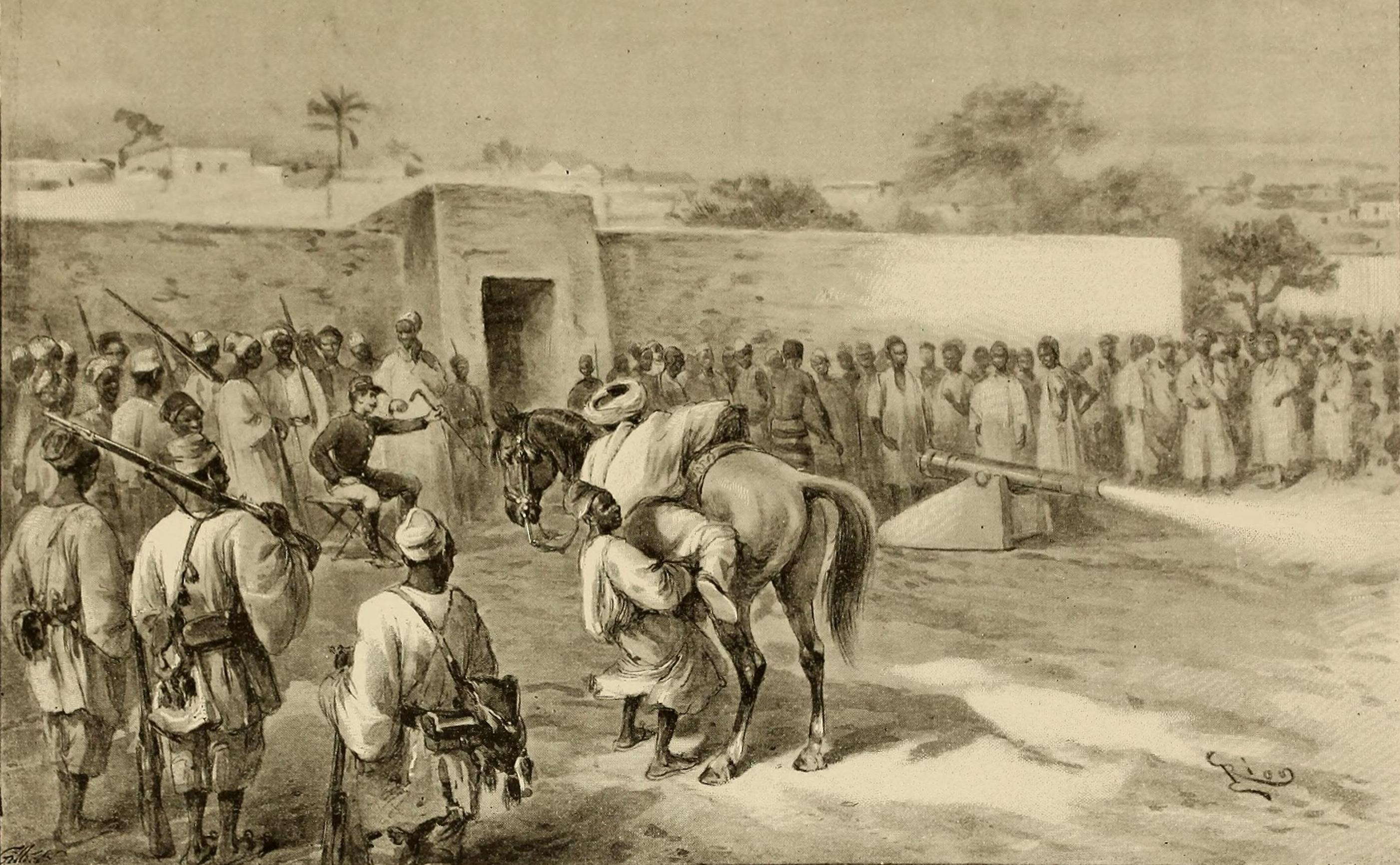
Shehu Ashimi receives Parfait-Louis Monteil at Kukawa

Bornu under the shehus was substantially weaker than the state had been a few centuries earlier. Much of its former western territory remained under the Sokoto Caliphate and the state was cut off from the trans-Saharan trade in the north. The economic basis of the state had been further weakened by European pressure to end the slave trade. An economic crisis in Europe had also caused alternate export goods, such as ivory and ostrich feathers, to lose their value. By the 1850s, the army the empire was able to muster numbered about 10,000 cavalry (500 armored) and a larger number of infantry. These numbers were a sharp decline from the army fielded by al-Kanemi mere decades prior, which numbered 30,000 cavalry and 9,000 spearmen. In 1844, the Ottoman governor of Tripolitania sent an envoy to Bornu to offer military protection in exchange for Bornu accepting Ottoman rule. The Bornuans refused, and replied that they were only interested in obtaining weapons from the Ottoman Empire.

Bornu became of interest to various European powers during the Scramble for Africa. In treaties and agreements in the 1890s, France and the United Kingdom worked to designate "spheres of influence" in Africa. During this time, French and British representatives attempted to sign treaties with the shehus of Bornu to eventually justify claims to the entire Bornuan territory in future negotiations. The French were particularly interested since they sought to link their existing colonies in Senegal, Algeria, and Congo. In 1890, the Royal Niger Company attempted to sign a treaty with shehu Ashimi but their representatives were dismissed after spending two months in Kukawa. The shehu then hoisted the flag of the Ottoman Empire as a symbol of his non-recognition of British authority. Parfait-Louis Monteil eventually managed to secure diplomatic relations with Bornu on behalf of France in 1892. By the time the French attempted to make use of this relationship, Bornu had been captured by the Sudanese invader Rabih az-Zubayr.

=== Fall of Kanem–Bornu (1893–1902) ===
==== Rabih az-Zubayr's empire (1893–1900) ====
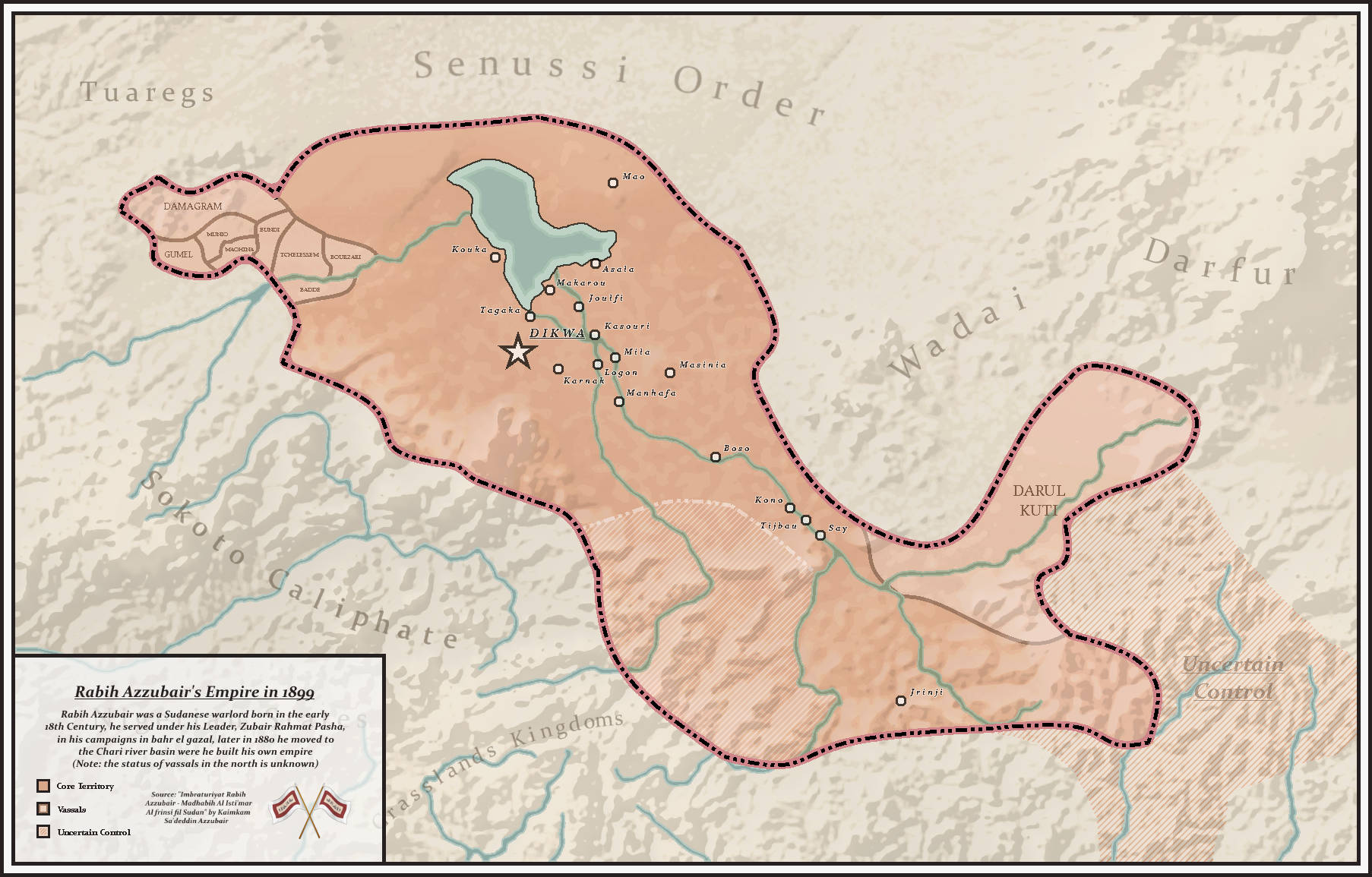
Land ruled by Rabih az-Zubayr in 1899

Rabih az-Zubayr was a Sudanese adventurer and slave raider who entered Bornuan territory in 1892/1893. Rabih's forces captured Karnak Logone, the capital of a small sultanate on the southeastern border of Bornu proper, and ejected the local population. With the fortified Karnak Logone as a base, Rabih could harvest resources from the vicinity and advance to Amja, on the Bornu border. Shehu Ashimi sent an army led by the experienced general Momman Tahr against Rabih. Rabih defeated Tahr's army at the battle of Amja, and Tahr was captured and executed. In August 1893, a second battle took place at Lekarawa, near Ngala. Rabih decisively defeated a Bornu army led by shehu Ashimi and his nephew Kyari. Ashimi and a few other survivors fled across the Yobe River, abandoning Kukawa.

Rabih spent some time at Kukawa but settled on Dikwa as a capital, on account of its better communications and water supply. Rabih's takeover was opposed by the people of Bornu and most of the empire initially remained loyal to the al-Kanemi dynasty. A peasant revolt led by a man identified as mallam Gantur managed to defeat one of Rabih's commanders before being put down. Shortly after the fall of Kukawa, Kyari seized power as the new shehu and Ashimi was assassinated in the aftermath. Kyari faced Rabih in battle on the banks of the Yobe River in February/March 1894. Rabih again emerged victorious and Kyari was captured and executed. Kiyari's brother Sanda Wuduroma made his way to southern Bornu, where he was proclaimed shehu, but he was captured and executed after less than a month. Kukawa was plundered and burned, with its 120,000–200,000 inhabitants killed, enslaved, or dispersed.

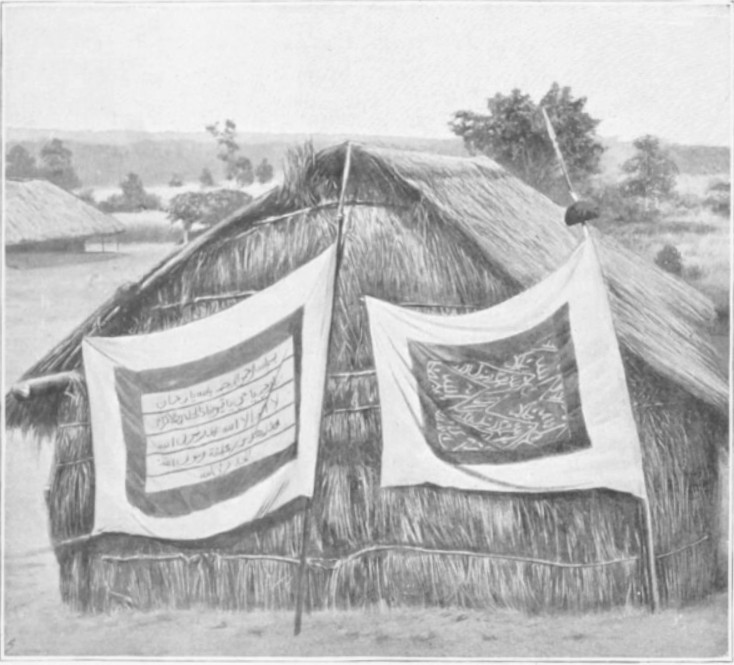
Battle flags of Rabih az-Zubayr

The death of Sanda Wuduroma left Rabih as the undisputed master of Bornu. The unprecedented conquest marked the first time the empire came under foreign domination. Geopolitically, Rabih largely behaved as his predecessors, working to maintain the borders of the empire and dominate the various lesser vassal states that surrounded the imperial core. His rule was however exceptionally brutal, marked by cruel punishments, heavy taxation, and an unprecedented concentration of power. Rabih established an autocratic state under himself as emir and a tiny military council (the Zubat al-Kubar). Rabih's commanders transitioned into being the main holders of fiefs in the empire. Those provincial rulers and courtiers who submitted to Rabih's forces were allowed to retain their holdings, albeit under close supervision of military commanders stationed at Dikwa. When local rulers became difficult to deal with, they were executed. In most cases, Rabih attempted to find replacements within their immediate families. Despite his brutality, Rabih's rule was in some ways also fairer and less corrupt than the aristocratic rule of the shehus that had preceded him. Although taxation was heavy, the tax rate was also fixed and taxes were collected only once a year. Most of the state income was spent on the army and defense; Rabih did establish a palace at Dikwa, but little money was otherwise spent on personal luxuries, in stark contrast to the shehus.

Domestically, Rabih's greatest focus was on tax collection and supplies. Although highly efficient, the tax system was extortionate on the people and taxes were so heavy and brutally collected that it inspired revolts and migrations out of the empire. Revolts were met with brutal punishments; an 1896 uprising in Nganzai led to the execution of over a hundred rebel leaders. Much of the money collected was spent on Rabih's palace and on the army. The plunder and mass displacement of people under Rabih, combined with the uncertainty created by the conquest, strongly impacted the Bornu economy, especially the agricultural sector. The state's formerly productive agricultural base was destroyed and Rabih was unable to revive it. Agriculture was further negatively affected by Rabih's army raiding villages for food, which fanned further unrest.

Rabih's conquest of Bornu was a threat to the colonial boundaries and spheres of influence envisioned in negotiations between the United Kingdom, France, and the German Empire. The British chose to recognise Rabih as a legitimate ruler of the empire, referring to him as the "Sultan of Borno". The French opted to deem Rabih illegitimate, since they could then justify conquests of parts of his empire. In 1899, Rabih had the French explorer Ferdinand de Béhagle killed and France responded by invading his empire. The French were easily able to recruit local allies in the war. Rabih was at first successful against the French under Émile Gentil, but was eventually defeated and killed at the battle of Kousséri (22 April 1900).

==== Al-Kanemi restoration (1900–1902) ====
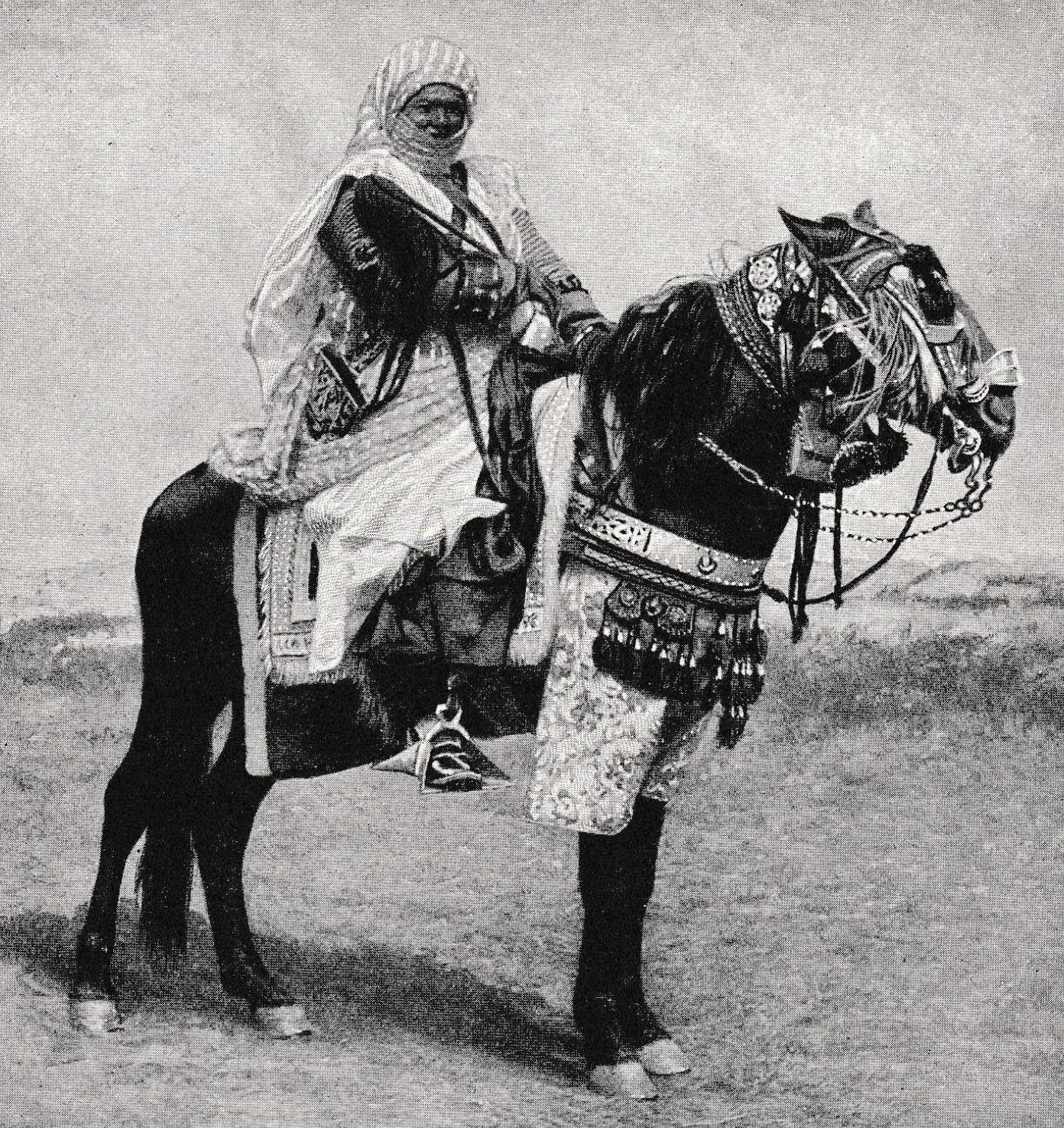
Abubakar Garbai, the last ruler of the Kanem–Bornu Empire

The death of Rabih created a power vacuum in the empire, paving the way for colonial occupation. Both the French and British worked to influence the struggles between the various claimants. By the time French forces came into contact with surviving princes of the al-Kanemi dynasty, the al-Kanemi forces had already regrouped under a recognised claimant, Sanda Kura, son of the shehu Ibrahim Kura.

When the French reached Sanda Kura's forces, they agreed to recognise him as the new shehu and he was invested as such by his followers on 14 January 1900. After Rabih's death at Kousséri, Rabih's son Fadlallah collected his family and property at Dikwa and then retreated south with an army numbering 5,000, pursued by the French. Sanda Kura was installed as Bornu's new ruler at Dikwa. The French soon grew dissatisfied with Sanda Kura's governance. He was removed from office in July/August and deported to Congo in October. In his place at Dikwa, the French installed his more pliable brother Abubakar Garbai as shehu.

French and British colonialism brought an end to the Kanem–Bornu Empire in 1902. Fadlallah tried to secure British support as ruler but his army was reached by French forces at Gujba on 23 August 1901 and Fadlallah was killed in the ensuing battle. Although left without a figurehead, British forces occupied much of Bornu in March 1902, put under the Northern Nigeria Protectorate. In 1902, Abubakar Garbai left Dikwa to become the figurehead shehu of "British Borno". The circumstances of this is unclear; British colonial sources claim that he was invited and accepted the invitation, whereas German colonial sources from the same time claim that he was kidnapped by British troops. Abubakar Garbai left Dikwa in the care of Sanda Mandarama, a brother of the former shehu Kiyari and the city was occupied by the French in April 1902 and incorporated into French Chad. Later in the same year, Dikwa was transferred to German control and became part of the German colony of Kamerun.

== Legacy and scholarship ==
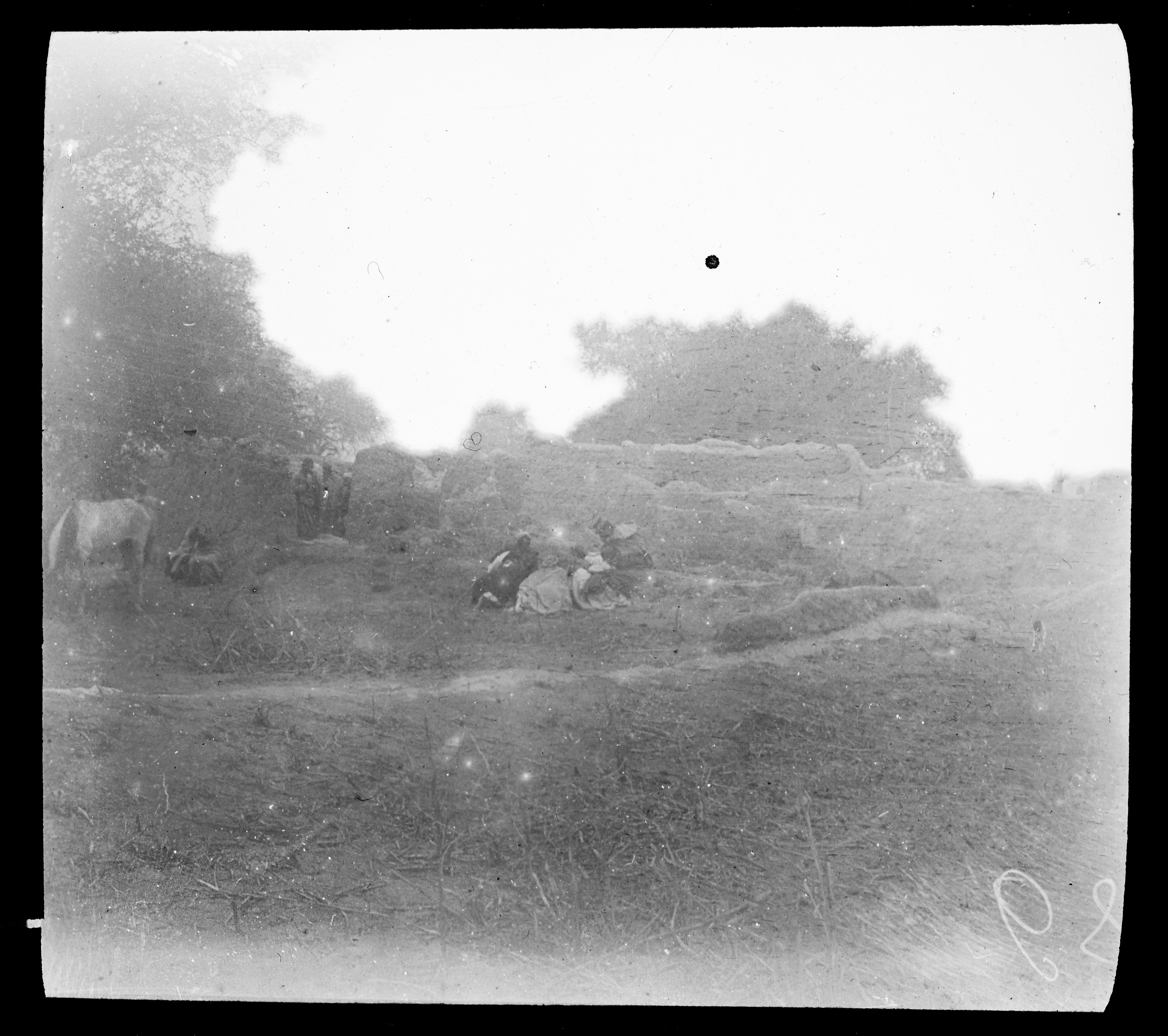
Ruins at Kukawa, 1900

Some of the people in the former empire, particularly the Toubou people, continued to resist colonisation, supported by the Ottoman Empire and the Senussi order. Resistance had largely died down by 1920, and the European colonies became firmly established. The division of the al-Kanemi dynasty under British and German rule has survived to the present in the Borno and Dikwa emirates, two traditional states in Nigeria.

European colonisation dismantled the political and economic organisation of the area around Lake Chad. Bornu went on to suffer from certain political and economical marginalisation by all of the colonial empires in the region, increased by the former country being cut up between different colonial linguistic spheres (e.g. the Anglophone Nigeria and Francophone Chad). In the 1950s, new Kanuri nationalist movements developed in Nigeria, mobilising against perceived Hausa domination in northern Nigeria and calling for restoring the territory of the late Kanem–Bornu Empire. Nationalist and secessionist movements increased in prominence in the 1970s which was a factor in the 1976 creation of the new Borno State in Nigeria. Kanuri nationalist movements experienced another prominent period in the 1990s, when they expanded to also include the Kanembu people. Nationalist groups sometimes refer to a proposed state covering Bornu and Kanem as Kanowra. In the early 21st century, continued marginalisation of the Bornu region, traceable back to colonisation and division of the former empire, led to the emergence of terrorist groups such as Boko Haram.

The first (Note: Dewière (2024) credits the first proper European history of the empire to French surgeon Pierre Girard (1685), who drew upon previous work of Leo Africanus (1530) and Giovanni Lorenzo d'Anania (1582), but also notes that Girard's history was not published.) European history of the Kanem–Bornu Empire was written by the 19th-century German traveler Heinrich Barth and published as part of his descriptions of journeys in the Sahel region (1858). Later travelers, such as Gustav Nachtigal, as well as colonial administrators, such as Richmond Palmer and Yves Urvoy, also wrote histories of Bornu, relying on Barth's work and on their own translations of sources. These 19th- and early 20th-century sources generally reflect racist and imperialist agendas of the contemporary colonial powers. Because Bornu was marginalised during colonisation, as well as after decolonisation, the Kanem–Bornu Empire was long neglected in historiography. Colonial historiographies were for the most part focused on the central regions of respective colonies, and thus on powers such as Sokoto, Songhai, Mali, and Ghana. Modern scholarship on the Kanem–Bornu Empire began to take shape in Nigeria in the 1960s and grew considerably in the 1970s. Kanem–Bornu scholarship has also increased in Europe and the United States since the 1970s, relying on new archaeological discoveries and analyses of local Arabic-language sources, oral sources, and Ottoman documents.

== Government and military ==
=== Sovereign and nobility ===
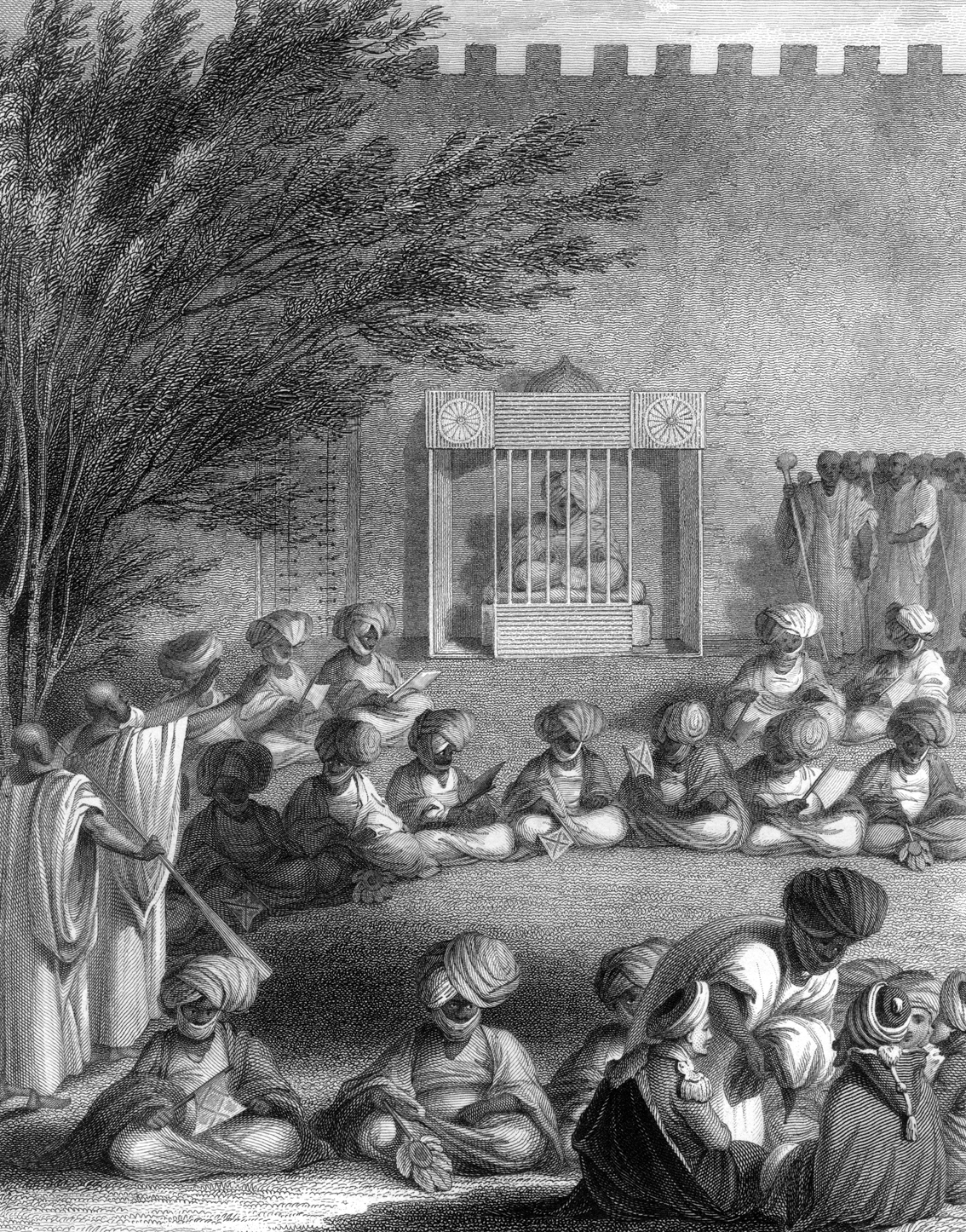
Mai Ibrahim IV Lefiami (seated in the zanadir) and his council at Kafela, by Edward Francis Finden (1823)

The title of mai is variously equated to emperor or king. After the conversion to Islam, the rulers of Kanem began to be referred to as sultan and emir in both internal and external sources, alongside the traditional style of mai. Any son of a mai was qualified to become the next mai, which sometimes led to succession conflict and civil war. Persistent conflict and rival claims plagued much of the empire's history and virtually no mai was ever completely secure on the throne.

At some point after the conversion to Islam, perhaps in the reign of Dunama II Dibalemi in the 13th century, the empire transitioned to a feudal political system. Around this time there appeared a class of princes (maina), and a large system of titles was developed, including styles such as arjinoma, yerima, and tegoma. Court titles such as musterema (chief eunuch) and ciroma (heir to the throne) also began to appear. Notable female figures include the gumsu (main wife of the mai), the mairatin (princesses), and the magram (official sister of the mai).

The court of the mai was characterised by much formality and ceremony. The mai held audience with the court from the zanadir, a wooden cage. Courtiers often wore overly large turbans and excessive shirts to match their physical appearance to their social status. After 1846, the shehus adopted some elements of the preceding mais. Their court was made more formal, though not to the same extent as that of the mais (the zanadir was for instance not adopted). Some of the former imperial titles were applied to the shehu's household; his senior wife became known as the ya gumsu, and traditional noble titles such as musterema and yerima continued to be used.

The mai, and later the shehu, was assisted in government by a council of state, referred to as nokuna or majilis. The council was typically composed of twelve royal, religious, and military notables (the exact officeholders could vary), though the precise governmental arrangement was flexible and subject to periodic change.

=== Fief administration ===
Administration of fiefs in the Kanem–Bornu Empire was handled through the chima system, first devised under the Sayfawa and later inherited by both the al-Kanemi dynasty and Rabih az-Zubayr. All land in the empire formally belonged to the sovereign. Fiefs were awarded by the mais and shehus to any persons they wished, including courtiers (kogunawa), princes (abbawa), princesses (nanawa), and religious clerics (ulama). Fief-holders could live in the lands given to them, or live in the capital and subsist on the revenue generated. Frontier fiefs could be given to military commanders, especially those of the lower classes, serving to strengthen the borders and further integrating the imperial periphery with the center. Some fiefs became attached to certain offices over time and became hereditary. Most fiefs reverted to the mai or shehu after the death of the holder; the ruler could then reassign it as they wished, either within or outside the former holder's family. Fiefs could also be revoked in the lifetime of a holder, or be sold to another person by the holder themself.

There were two classes of chima holders, chima gana (junior chima) and chima kura (senior chima). Chima kuras were the formal owners of a fief and could own multiple territories throughout the empire. From the time of Ali I Gaji onwards, fief holders lived at the capital, while the individual fiefs were administered on their behalf by chima ganas. The only notable figure in the nobility to not reside in the capital itself was the galadima, a high-ranking governor of the western provinces. As day-to-day overseers, the power of a chima gana within their territory was near unlimited, as long as taxes and tribute was paid to the central government, law and order was maintained, and armies were raised when demanded by the sovereign.

The number and size of the fiefs in the empire varied throughout its history. By 1893, the empire was divided into 524 fiefs, administered by 104 chima kura. Fiefs could be composed of a single village or a whole district.

=== Military and warfare ===
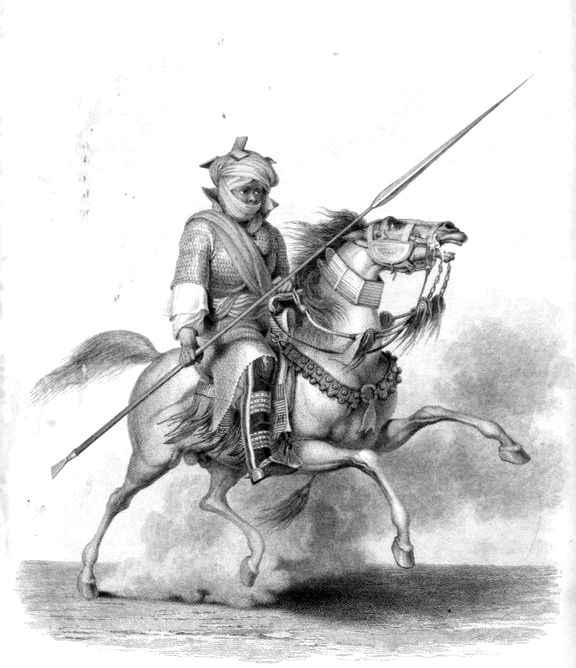
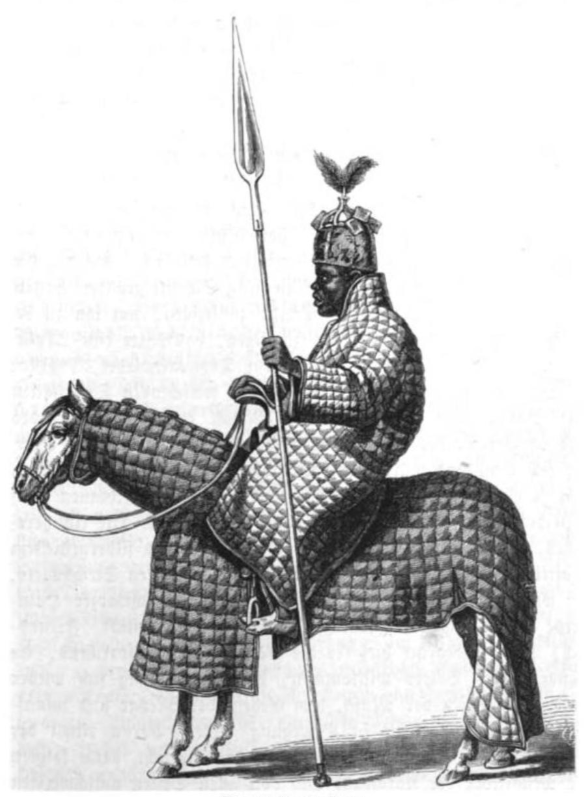
Bornu cavalry illustrated by Edward Francis Finden (1826, left) and Gustav Nachtigal (1887, right)

By c. 1000, the army of the Kanem–Bornu Empire had developed into a powerful force, strong enough to control the trade routes in the vicinity of the imperial core. Military campaigns outside the territory of the empire were for most of its history focused on raiding and establishing tributary relationships, rather than outright conquest. When troops were needed, they were raised through the chima fief system.

The empire relied on cavalry as the central part of the military, with the horses imported through trade with North Africa. At the time of Dunama II Dibalemi in the 13th century, the empire had a force of 40,000 cavalry. Under Idris IV Alooma in the 16th century, the army was modernised through the import of firearms, and the help of Ottoman mercenaries and military advisors. The use of cavalry was further expanded, camel corps were introduced for long-distance expeditions, fortified camps began to be used, and a fleet of ferries was created for logistics and river crossings. Firearms were also introduced but had ceased to be used by the end of the 17th century. The empire was still able to field 30,000 cavalry and 9,000 spearmen under Muhammad al-Kanemi in the Fula jihads, but its size had rapidly declined to about 10,000 cavalry by the 1850s.

The highest-ranking general and commander of the army bore the title kaigama, and often came from a slave background. From the 15th to 19th century, the kaigama had their own impressive palace in Ngazargamu. The origin of the title kaigama is unclear. It appears to translate to "master of Kaiga", perhaps originally referring to a district southwest of Lake Chad. Great trust was placed in the ability of the kaigama; a battlefield defeat often resulted in the kaigama being replaced. Some kaigamas were influential and powerful enough to confront and depose a mai.

== Society ==
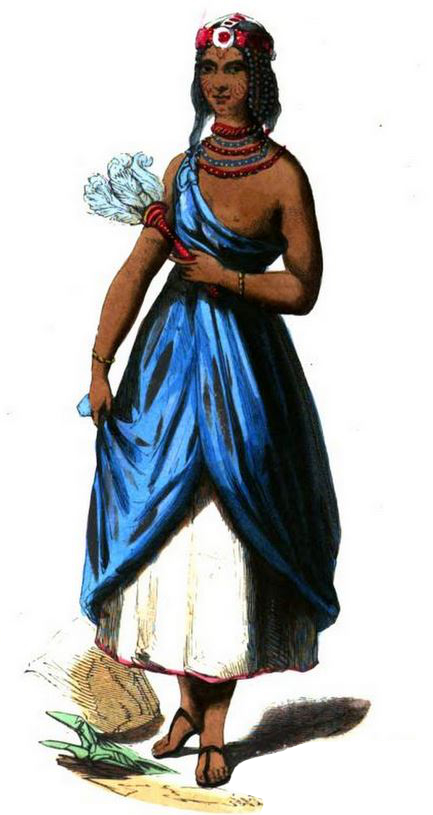
Young woman from Bornu, by Heinrich Berghaus (1847)

The Kanem–Bornu Empire's active contact with North Africa resulted not only in trade and diplomacy, but also garnered the empire some cosmopolitan influence and contacts. The empire had considerable influence in its overall region, with both Nguzargamu and the later Kukawa having been important centers in the Sudan region. At the height of the Sayfawa dynasty's rule, the safety provided by the state and the firm grasp it had on the trade routes led to a common saying that even "a lone woman clad in gold might walk with none to fear but God". Although imperial power gradually declined over the course of its last centuries, the empire continued to hold symbolic importance among its neighbors. In 1800, virtually all of Hausaland was still nominally tributaries of the empire and sent annual gifts to the mai.

Due to the advance of Islam and Kanurisation among the populace of the empire, Kanem and Bornu gradually developed from highly diverse realms in the Middle Ages to a relatively homogenous country by 1800, ruled by a powerful aristocracy. Sunni Maliki Islamic law was applied in the empire, supported by scholars trained in schools in North Africa, the Middle East, and (from at least the 15th century) within the empire itself. The peasant population of the empire was slower to convert to Islam than the aristocracy, but efforts from the Middle Ages onwards were made by religious teachers known as mallams. The mallams roamed rural areas of the empire and by 1800 there were many so-called "mallam villages", where educated men farmed and studied together, exempt from taxes.

The agriculture of the empire was probably similar to the agriculture of the region today. Crops were planted at the beginning of the rainy season (June–October). The main crops were varieties of guinea corn and millet. Other crops were also cultivated, such as maize, onion, rice, cucumber, peanuts, and calabash, but on a lesser scale. In the dry season, people lived off stored grain and other staple foods.

Records of women in the history of the Kanem–Bornu Empire are rare. The limited source material that is known indicates that women were important and valued in diplomacy, long-distance correspondence, and military logistics. 17th-century sources from North Africa indicate that women from Bornu were active members of the population, sometimes on the international stage. (Note: The 17th-century French surgeon Pierre Girard, an Ottoman captive in Tripoli, wrote in 1685 that women from Bornu baked the best bread in the city.) Noblewomen from Bornu sometimes accompanied diplomatic missions and learnt different languages to communicate with women of other countries. (Note: On 28 July 1789, Miss Tully, wife of the British consul in Tripoli, recorded that a prince of Bornu was in the city: "A black prince of Borno is at present here. He comes from Tunis, and is returning to the Borno. He had three of his women with him: one of them, in her travels with the prince, had learnt the Italian language sufficiently to be able to express herself in the Franca language.") During military campaigns, women could be put in charge of organising supplies.

As was the case for other states in the region, slavery was an important factor in the society and economy of the Kanem–Bornu Empire. Slaves were collected through trade, tribute from other states, and through raids and war, mainly against non-Muslim neighbors. Slaves were variously sold through the trans-Saharan trade or kept locally. Local slaves were used in many different tasks, for instance in agricultural production. Whereas commoners worked their own lands and paid taxes, aristocrats acquired slaves to work for them. Slaves were also used for military purposes and the empire relied heavily on slaves for its cavalry armies.

== Economy ==
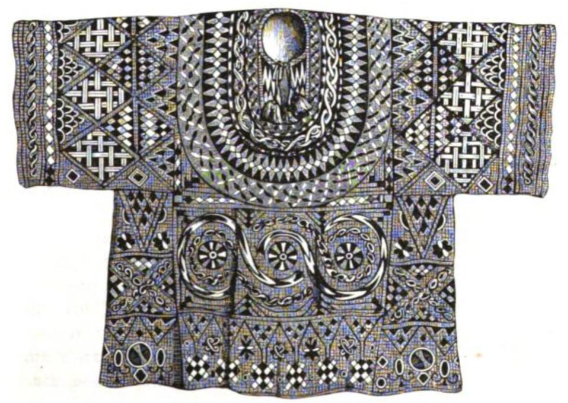
Embroidered shirt of a woman from Bornu, illustrated by Gustav Nachtigal (1887)

Regional and long-distance trade of commodities formed the core of the economy of Kanem and Bornu. The empire produced salt, textile, and agricultural products which were sold through the trans-Saharan trade. The salt industry was particularly prosperous, producing perhaps 6500–9000 tons per year. The empire likely supplied salt across the entire surrounding region. Slaves were also an important export and the Kanem–Bornu Empire participated actively in the trans-Saharan slave trade until the end of the 19th century. Slaves from Bornu are first recorded in the Mediterranean in the 16th century, when Bornu ambassadors sold them in exchange for Ottoman horses and firearms.

Little is known of what goods were imported by the Kanem–Bornu Empire. It is likely that traders imported books, paper, and textiles, since the empire is known to have established Islamic schools and certain rulers are recorded to have wore clothes made in Tunis. Based on known historical patterns of trade between sub-Saharan Africa and North Africa, the empire is also likely to have imported horses, copper, and various manufactured products.

The main currencies historically used in the Kanem–Bornu Empire were copper and coined silver, cowrie shells, and cotton strips. Cowrie shells were officially recognised as currency only in 1848, due to the economic power of the Sokoto Caliphate where they were also widespread as currency. This move made Bornu dependent on the Sokoto Caliphate's monetary system. In the last few centuries the empire also recognised some European currencies, with the Spanish dollar and later the Maria Theresa thaler at points serving as standard currencies. In the early 19th century, shehu Muhammad al-Kanemi and his son shehu Umar asked various British consuls in North Africa for coining machines so that they could establish their own currency, the "Bornoan dirham". This project was abandoned after the British declined their requests.

== See also ==
- List of kingdoms and empires in African history
- History of Central Africa
- Medieval and early modern Africa
- Sahelian kingdoms
