= Battle of Lekarawa =

- Part of Rabih az-Zubayr's invasion of Bornu
Date	August 1893 (?)
Location	Lekarawa, Bornu
Result	Rabih az-Zubayr victory

Belligerents
Kanem–Bornu Empire	Rabih az-Zubayr's forces

Commanders and leaders
Kyari; Ashimi	Rabih az-Zubayr

Strength
Unknown	Unknown

Casualties and losses
Unknown	Unknown

The Battle of Lekarawa was the second battle fought between the Kanem–Bornu Empire and the warlord Rabih az-Zubayr, who invaded the empire in 1893. The battle was probably fought in August 1893 at Lekarawa, just west of Ngala.

== Background ==
The initial response of the Kanem–Bornu Empire to Rabih's invasion had been to send an army under the experienced general Momman Tahr. Tahr's force was defeated by Rabih at the battle of Amja in late May 1893. When the empire's ruler, shehu Ashimi, heard the news of Tahr's defeat, a second army was sent out. Ashimi accompanied the new force but it was led by his nephew, Kyari.

== Battle ==
Kyari and Ashimi's army reached Rabih's forces well after the beginning of the wet season, probably in August. The sizes of each army are unknown, though the Bornuan force outnumbered Rabih's army. The ensuing battle took place at Lekarawa, located just west of Ngala.

Rabih secured a resounding victory at the battle. Both Kyari and Ashimi survived and managed to retreat back to Kukawa, the imperial capital.

== Aftermath ==
Kyari and Ashimi arrived back at Kukawa alongside surviving elements of their defeated army. The imperial court and the capital was sent into a panic due to suffering another overwhelming defeat. Ashimi was widely expected to make another attempt to defeat Rabih but instead fled in the night, abandoning Kukawa and leaving the town undefended. The capital was brutally sacked by Rabih as Ashimi, Kyari, and other officials fled west.
