= On the nature of demons =

Treatise on demonology, 1570

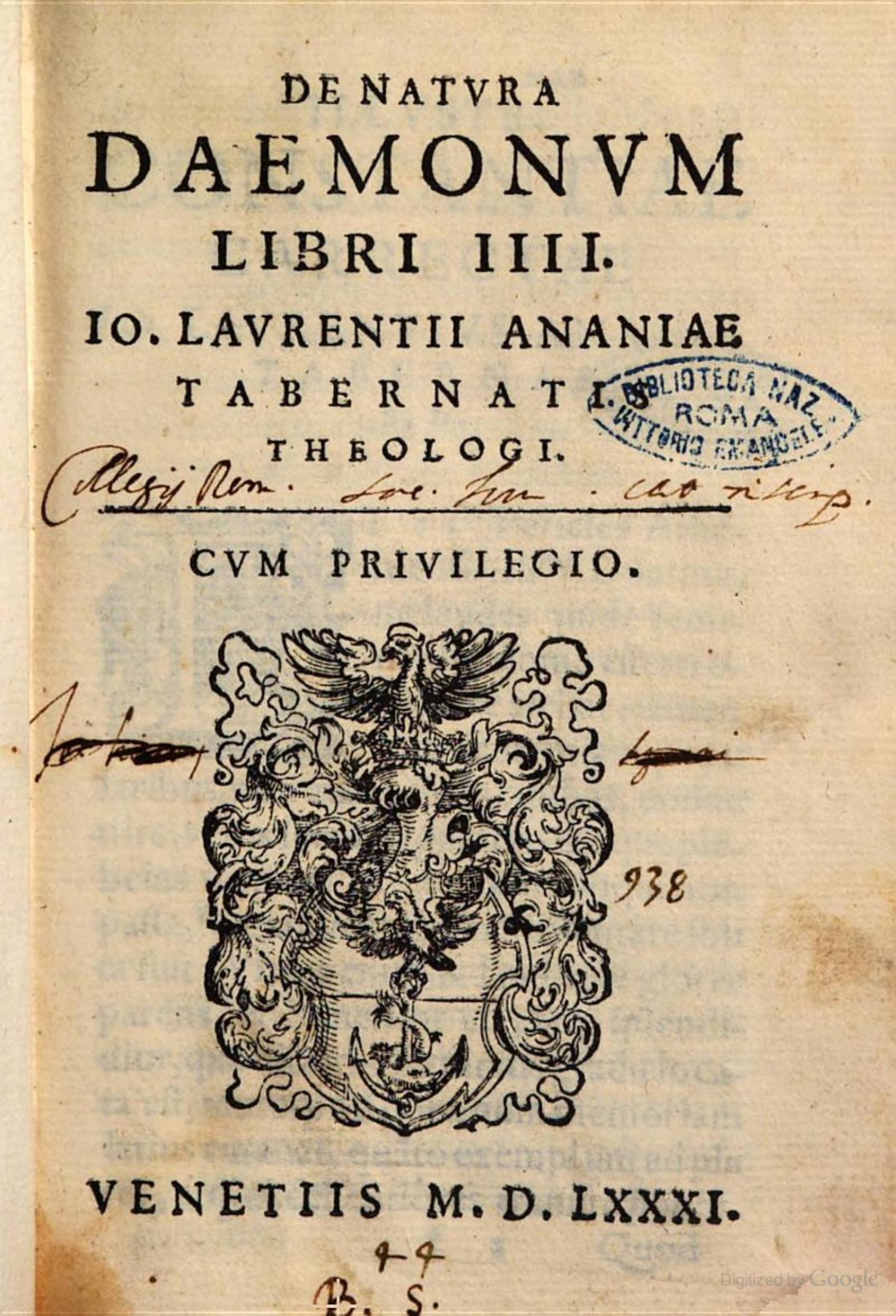
- De natura daemonum, 1581 edition.
- Author: Giovanni Lorenzo d'Anania
- Original title: De natura daemonum
- Language: Latin
- Publication date: 1570

On the nature of demons (latin: De natura daemonum) is a treatise on demonology by Giovanni Lorenzo d'Anania, first published in 1570. The work is referenced by Francesco Maria Guazzo in his Compendium Maleficarum (1608), and mentioned in the 1957 horror novelette "The Peabody Heritage" by August Derleth and H. P. Lovecraft.

== Publication history ==
On the nature of demons has had several editions: Venice 1581, Naples 1582, Venice 1589, Rome 1654. The Roman edition was dedicated to Pope Innocent X.

== Contents ==
The treatise is divided into four books. The first book includes a definition of demon as a malevolent entity of superior intellect, and attempts to prove their existence. The second book is focused on the origin of demons; it retells Lucifer's rebellion against God and the original sin. The third book explains the relationship between demons and witches, and the different powers that demons can grant them. The fourth and final book is the most extensive, and expands on the different abilities that demons possess, illustrating them with real-life examples.

== In popular culture ==
De Natura Daemonum is the title of a 2005 album by Peruvian death metal band Mortem.

== Bibliography ==
- Lea, Henry Charles (1986). Materials toward a history of witchcraft. Vol. II. AMS Press.
