= Battle of Amja =

- Part of Rabih az-Zubayr's invasion of Bornu
Date	Late May 1893
Location	Near Amja, Bornu 11°40′49″N 14°31′30″E
Result	Rabih az-Zubayr victory

Belligerents
Kanem–Bornu Empire	Rabih az-Zubayr's forces

Commanders and leaders
Momman Tahr (surrendered) (executed)	Rabih az-Zubayr

Strength
30,000 (?)	3,000

Casualties and losses
Unknown	Unknown

The battle of Amja was the first battle fought between the Kanem–Bornu Empire and the warlord Rabih az-Zubayr, who invaded the empire in 1893. The battle was fought at the end of May 1893 near Amja, on the southeastern Bornu frontier.

== Background ==
In the summer of 1893, the Sudanese warlord Rabih az-Zubayr moved his army into Bornu, having already conducted extensive campaigns in surrounding territories. The ruler of Bornu, Ashimi, delegated leadership to stop the invasion to the general Momman Tahr, perhaps hoping that Tahr would be defeated so that he would be eliminated as a political rival. Rabih awaited the response from the Kanem–Bornu Empire at Amja, on the Bornu frontier.

== Army compositions ==
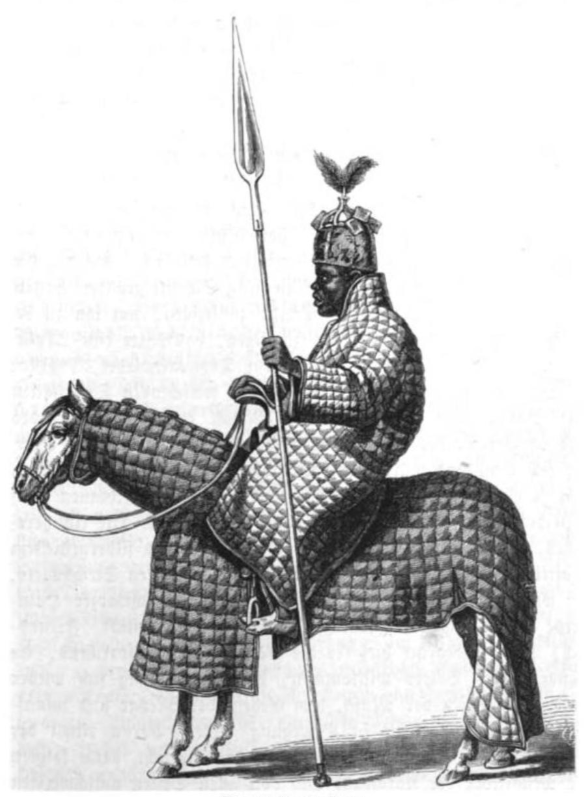
Bornu cavalry illustrated by Gustav Nachtigal (1887)

Rabih az-Zubayr's army numbered about 3,000 men, half of whom were armed with rifles and muskets. The force commanded by Momman Tahr was significantly larger and consisted mostly of cavalry. Some sources claim that Tahr commanded as many as 30,000 men, though this might be an exaggeration.

== Battle ==
Rabih's forces were on a raised fossil dune, fronted by clay that had been made sticky after recent rain. Rabih further positioned his army so that his right flank was protected by a swamp.

Sources about the battle claim that Tahr made a tactical blunder, leading a frontal charge through the swamp in an attempt to catch Rabih by surprise. During this charge, a large segment of cavalry are said to have become stuck in the swamp and then shot down by Rabih's riflemen. Lavers (1993) doubted this account since Tahr was an experienced general, who along with several of his officers would have had experience of the region. Lavers proposed that the battle took place on the onset of the wet season and that suggested that the horses of Tahr's cavalry becoming stuck in wet clay contributed to the Kanem–Bornu defeat.

After the stuck cavalry was decimated, the rest of the Kanem–Bornu army fled. Momman Tahr and two leading kachellas (generals) were captured in the battle and executed by Rabih.
