= Ashimi of Bornu =

Ashimi
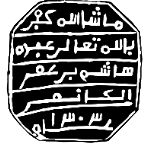
- Ashimi's official seal, 1885

Shehu of the Kanem–Bornu Empire
- Reign: 1885/1886 – November/December 1893
- Predecessor: Ibrahim Kura
- Successor: Kyari
- Died: November/December 1893; N'galagati, Bornu
- Dynasty: al-Kanemi dynasty
- Father: Umar Kura

Hashim bin Umar al-Kanemi, called Ashimi or Hashimi, was the shehu (ruler) of the Kanem–Bornu Empire in 1885/1886–1893. Ashimi is remembered as a pious and honest but also weak and indecisive ruler. Ashimi presided over a time of both economic and political crisis and faced the colonial interests of Britain and France, as well as an invasion of the empire by the warlord Rabih az-Zubayr, challenges he proved unprepared for. In the aftermath of disastrous losses to Rabih in 1893, Ashimi was replaced as shehu with his nephew Kyari and then assassinated.

== Accession ==
Ashimi was a brother of his immediate predecessors, shehus Ibrahim Kura and Bukar Kura, and the fourth-born son of shehu Umar Kura. Ashimi was selected by the influential courtiers at the imperial court to become shehu after Ibrahim Kura's death in late 1885 or early 1886. Whereas Ibrahim Kura's reign had been short and chaotic, Ashimi was not expected to disturb the status quo of the empire or its court and was selected for this reason.

Ashimi was pious Muslim who attempted to follow Sharia to the best of his ability. There is a general agreement in the sources that Ashimi was a weak ruler who was unable to act decisively on external and internal issues. Ashimi's indecisiveness presented a major problem from the very beginning of his reign since the empire experienced an economic crisis and great divisions had formed at court in Ibrahim Kura's reign.

== Reign ==
=== Early reign ===
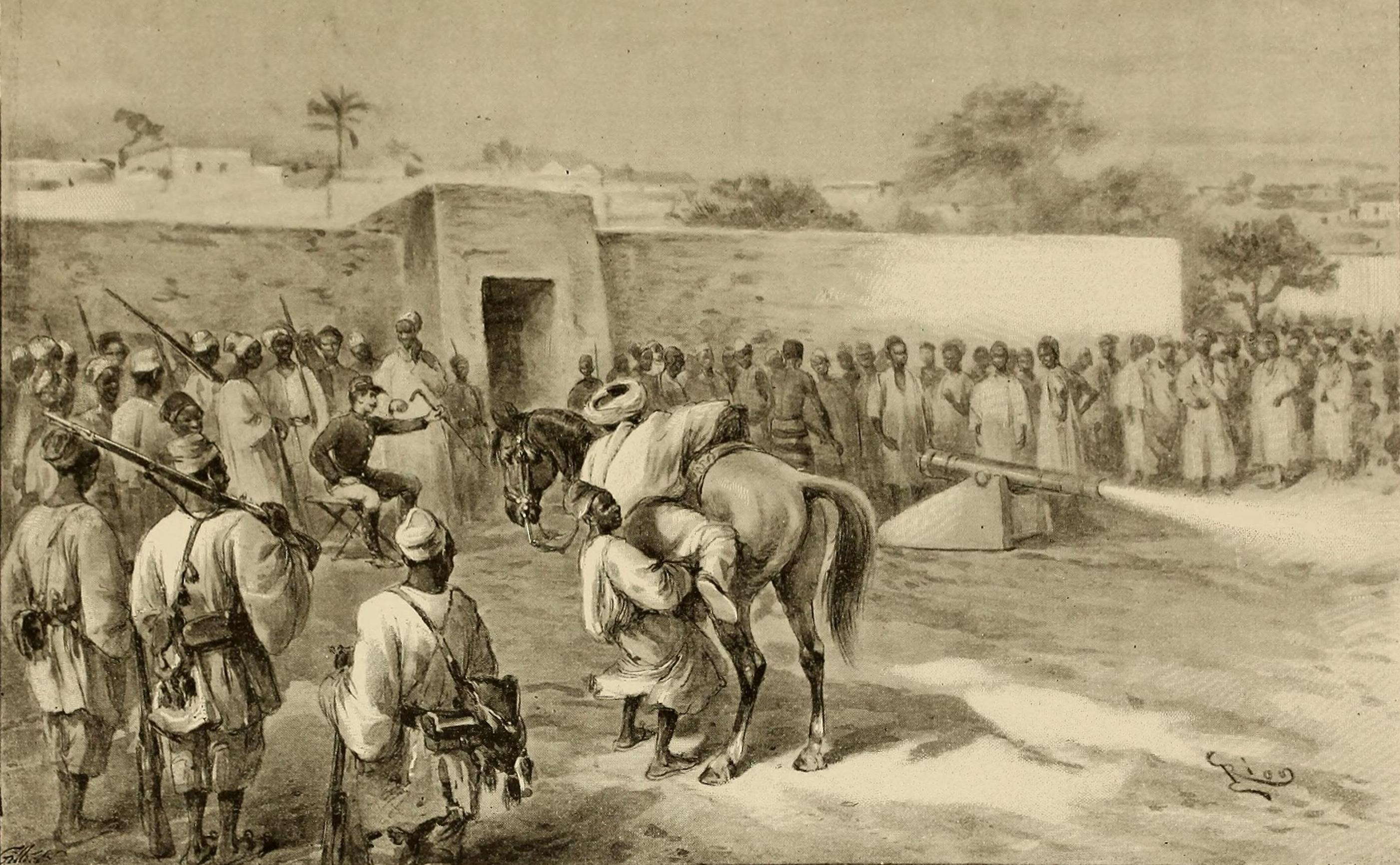
Ashimi receives Parfait-Louis Monteil at Kukawa, 1891

Ashimi proved unable to deal with his political opponents. Momman Tahr, Ibrahim Kura's waziri (vizier), was removed from his position but not from the court. Tahr acted towards the new shehu in a derogatory and independent manner, and was considered a threat to the administration, but was never disciplined or punished by Ashimi. Ashimi also faced a problem in Shettima Abdulkarim, an influential court eunuch and a political ally of Kyari, Bukar Kura's son. Kyari was widely regarded as a possible political rival to Ashimi. Ashimi considered replacing Abdulkarim with another eunuch loyal to himself, Mala Adam, but never mustered enough courage to go through with this.

Ashimi was unable to curtail an ongoing economic crisis in the empire, begun under his predecessors. The only economic measure implemented under Ashimi was imposing price controls on the sale of millet in the markets of Kukawa, the imperial capital. Ashimi did not sufficiently intervene in problems faced by his allies and vassals, resulting in a deterioration of respect and influence. Around the time of Ashimi's rise to the throne, the throne of the autonomous Sultanate of Damagaram was usurped by Suleyman dan Aisa. Instead of supporting the legitimate claimant, Abba Gato, Ashimi confirmed the appointment of Suleyman. Bornu would later receive little to no aid from Damagaram during Rabih az-Zubayr's invasion. Throughout Ashimi's reign, Damagaram also attacked several Bornu vassal states without facing any opposition from the shehu. Ashimi sent a small force to assist in a succession conflict in Bagirmi but took no further action after his troops were defeated.

In 1890 or 1891, the British Royal Niger Company sent an expedition led by Charles MacIntosh to negotiate a trade treaty with Ashimi. Fearful of the prospect of colonial takeover, Ashimi dismissed MacIntosh after two months and hoisted the flag of the Ottoman Empire as a symbol of non-recognition of British authority. Instead of stimulating trade with the British colonial outposts in the south, Ashimi worked to encourage trade with North Africa. Trade with the north had long been in decline by Ashimi's time. In 1892, a French mission led by Parfait-Louis Monteil eventually managed to secure diplomatic relations with Kanem–Bornu on behalf of France. In his writings, Monteil described Ashimi as "honest man and a fervent Muslim" and a "philosopher and a litterateur" but also "incapable of an act of energy".

=== Rabih's invasion ===
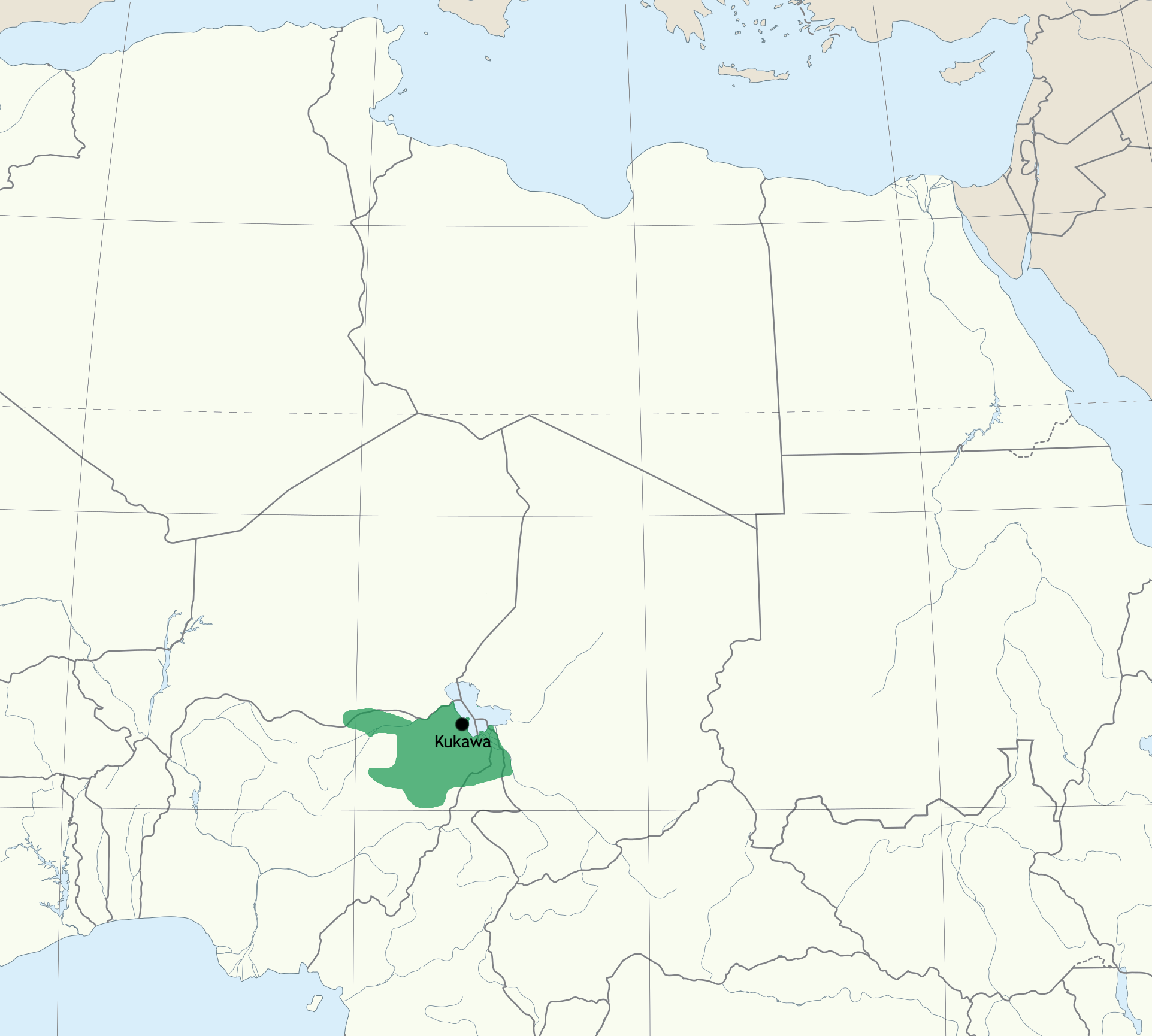
Map of the Kanem–Bornu Empire in 1893, prior to its conquest by Rabih az-Zubayr

Rabih az-Zubayr was active in the vicinity of Bornu in the early 1890s. Ashimi and his forces were in no way prepared for the prospect of an invasion and the shehu made little effort to halt Rabih's advances. When Rabih conducted campaigns against imperial vassals and allies, the shehu merely adopted a policy to "wait and see". Ashimi hoped that Rabih would spare his empire since the exile Hayatu ibn Sa'id was residing in Bornu; Hayatu was a claimant to the Sokoto Caliphate and a son-in-law of Rabih. It was believed that Rabih might entirely bypass Bornu and focus his attention on Sokoto. When Bagirmi requested aid against Rabih in 1892, Ashimi refused to send troops but imposed restrictions on the export of weapons and ammunition to Rabih, though these restrictions were poorly enforced and Rabih continued to secure supplies from Bornu. Once Rabih had conquered Bagirmi he imposed demands on the sultan of Karnak Logone, a vassal state of Bornu. The sultan was forced to comply and was reprimanded for this by Ashimi, who however took no further action to maintain his authority.

In the summer of 1893, Rabih and his army entered Bornu proper and camped at Amja, on the frontier. Ashimi had not obtained any formal peace agreement with Rabih, not had he made any effort to discover his intentions. Rabih had in contrast gathered much intelligence on Bornu. Ashimi eventually decided to send Momman Tahr with an army against Rabih, possibly intending for Tahr to lose so that he would be eliminated as a political rival. Tahr was defeated and killed in the ensuing battle of Amja in May 1893. In August 1893, Ashimi himself accompanied an army against Rabih, though the forces were led by his nephew Kyari. In the ensuing battle of Lekarawa, Rabih was again victorious. The imperial court in Kukawa was thrown into a panic. Ashimi was expected to gather his forces and march against Rabih again. Instead, Ashimi, his family, and some of his followers fled west in the night. The capital was left to the mercy of Rabih, who laid waste to the town.

=== Deposition and death ===
Although Ashimi had been defeated and the capital had been lost, most of the empire was still loyal to the al-Kanemi dynasty (the family of the shehus). Ashimi established himself in the village of Maganwa, some distance south of Geidam. Some officials supported Ashimi and suggested that they could flee beyond the Yobe River to be out of Rabih's reach. Many officials instead supported the idea to proclaim a new shehu and settled on Kyari, whose influence quickly eclipsed that of Ashimi. In November or December 1893, Kyari was appointed as the new shehu in a ceremony at Geidam. Ashimi attended the ceremony, indicating his support for his own deposition.

Kyari had Ashimi assassinated shortly after the ceremony, while Ashimi was saying his morning prayers in N'galagati, near Geidam. The reason for Kyari having Ashimi killed is unclear. Some accounts claim that Ashimi was corresponding with Rabih whereas others claim that Kyari feared that loyalties among his courtiers and forces would be divided between himself and his uncle.

== Family ==
Ashimi reportedly had over 350 children, many of who were adults by the time of his accession in 1885/1886.
