= Momman Tahr =

Official and general in the Kanem–Bornu Empire

- Died: May 1893; Amja, Bornu
- Military career
- Allegiance: Kanem–Bornu Empire
- Conflicts: Battle of Amja (1893)

Momman Tahr bin Ahamed Gonimi (Note: The name is variously spelled as Momman Tahr and Moman Tahr.) (died May 1893) was an official and general in the Kanem–Bornu Empire. Tahr rose to prominence as a political ally of shehu Ibrahim Kura (r. 1884/1885–1885/1886) and served at the imperial court as waziri (vizier) in his reign. Tahr was dismissed from this position under Ibrahim's successor, shehu Ashimi, but retained political influence. Tahr was selected to lead the initial campaign against the warlord Rabih az-Zubayr, who invaded the empire in 1893, and was killed at the battle of Amja.

== Career ==
Momman Tahr enters the historical record in the 1880s, as the closest companion of Ibrahim Kura, the younger brother of shehu Bukar Kura (r. 1881–1884/1885). Known as an experienced general, Tahr was also widely considered to be disagreeable and difficult to work with by courtiers in Kukawa, the imperial capital. In 1884 or 1885, Ibrahim Kura seized the throne in the aftermath of Bukar Kura's death. Tahr was appointed as Ibrahim Kura's waziri (vizier).

As waziri, Tahr aided in Ibrahim Kura's efforts to reorganise the imperial court and its power structure, taking actions both against slave officials and generals, as well as the aristocracy. On Ibrahim's orders, Tahr at one point took over a compound belonging to the courtier Abba Beddowai bin al-Hajj Bashir by force, forcing Beddowai's staff to flee by breaking a hole in the wall, simply so that Tahr could live closer to the palace. Ibrahim Kura and Tahr's efforts inspired much content among the courtiers in Kukawa. Ibrahim Kura died at some point between mid-October 1885 and February 1886, having ruled for only about a year, though there is no evidence that he was murdered.

Ibrahim Kura's successor, shehu Ashimi, dismissed Tahr as waziri but did not remove him from the court. Ashimi was known for his indecesiveness; despite Tahr acting derogatory towards the new shehu and being considered a threat to the new administration, he was never disciplined or punished. In the summer of 1893, the Sudanese warlord Rabih az-Zubayr invaded the empire. After some deliberation, Ashimi sent Tahr with an army to face the invader, perhaps intending Tahr to lose so that he would be eliminated as a political rival. In May 1893, Tahr and his forces faced Rabih at the battle of Amja, where they were defeated. Tahr was captured in the battle and executed by Rabih.
