= Giovanni Lorenzo d'Anania =

- Born: 1545; Taverna, Italy
- Died: 1607–1609; Taverna, Italy
- Other names: Gian Lorenzo d'Anania, Johannes Laurentius Anania
- Occupations: geographer, theologian

Giovanni Lorenzo d'Anania or Gian Lorenzo d'Anania (Latin: Johannes Laurentius Anania, 1545–1609) was an Italian geographer and theologian.

== Biography ==
Little is known for certain of d'Anania's life. His dates of birth and death are uncertain. He was born in Taverna, a city in the province of Catanzaro in Sila Piccola. He later studied natural science, languages and theology, probably in Naples. He certainly lived there for a few years and served as the teacher of the Archbishop Mario Carafa. At Carafa's death on 11 September 1575, d'Anania returned to Taverna where he remained until his death (between 1607 and 1609).

During d'Anania's stay in Naples, he published his most famous work, L'Universale fabbrica del Mondo, ovvero Cosmografia (1573), a geographical work which consists of a preface and four volumes that provide a picture of geographical knowledge in the second half of the 16th century. A new, second edition was prepared in Venice in 1576, in which d'Anania supplemented physical geography, with history and anthropology, as well as information religious faiths. The longest volume of the four treatises is the first, dedicated to Europe (the regions are discussed in this order: Ireland, England, Scotland, Portugal, Spain, France and Switzerland, Reno and Holland, Germany, Denmark, Italy, Slavonia, Bosnia and Raška, Albania, Bulgaria, Romania, Greece, Poland, Estonia, Latvia, Lithuania, Norway, Sweden, Finland, Russia, Ukraine, and the Arctic); while the remaining three treatises cover Asia, Africa and West Indies.

D'Anania also authored a theological work titled De natura daemonum, first published in Venice in 1570. In it, d'Anania posits the existence of demons, malevolent beings behind the works of astrologers and necromancers and who are responsible for any diseases which can be cured by the intercession of saints. De natura daemonum saw many editions, including that produced by Aldus Manutius. In 1654 Gian Lorenzo's nephew, Marcello Anania, prepared an edition titled De substantiis separatis, which contained the previously unpublished De natura Angelorum.

== Works ==
- De natura daemonum. Venice, 1570.
- Dell'Vniuersal fabrica del mondo trattato dell'eccell. M. Lorenzo Anania della città di Tauerna cosmografo, et teologo doue s'ha piena notitia de i costumi, leggi, città, fiumi, monti, prouincie, & popoli del mondo. Naples: Gioseppe Cacchij dell'Aquila, 1573.

== Bibliography ==
- Gaspare de Caro. "ANANIA, Giovanni Lorenzo d'." In Dizionario Biografico degli Italiani, vol. 3. Rome: Istituto dell'Enciclopedia Italiana, 1961. (on-line).
- Accattatis, Luigi. "Gian Lorenzo d'Anania." In Le biografie degli uomini illustri delle Calabrie, Vol. II, Secoli XVI e XVII, 95-98. Cosenza: Dalla Tipografia municipale, 1870; Facsimile edition, A. Forni, 1977.
- Lange, Dierk, and Silvio Berthoud. "L'intérieur de l'Afrique occidentale d'après Giovanni Lorenzo Anania (XVIe siècle)". Cahiers d'histoire mondiale, 14, no. 2 (1972): 299-351.
- Modern critical edition: L'Universal fabrica del mondo, overo cosmografia, edited by Ulderico Nisticò. Soveria Mannelli: Rubbettino, 2005, 2009.
